= Mermaid =

Legendary aquatic creature with an upper body in human female form

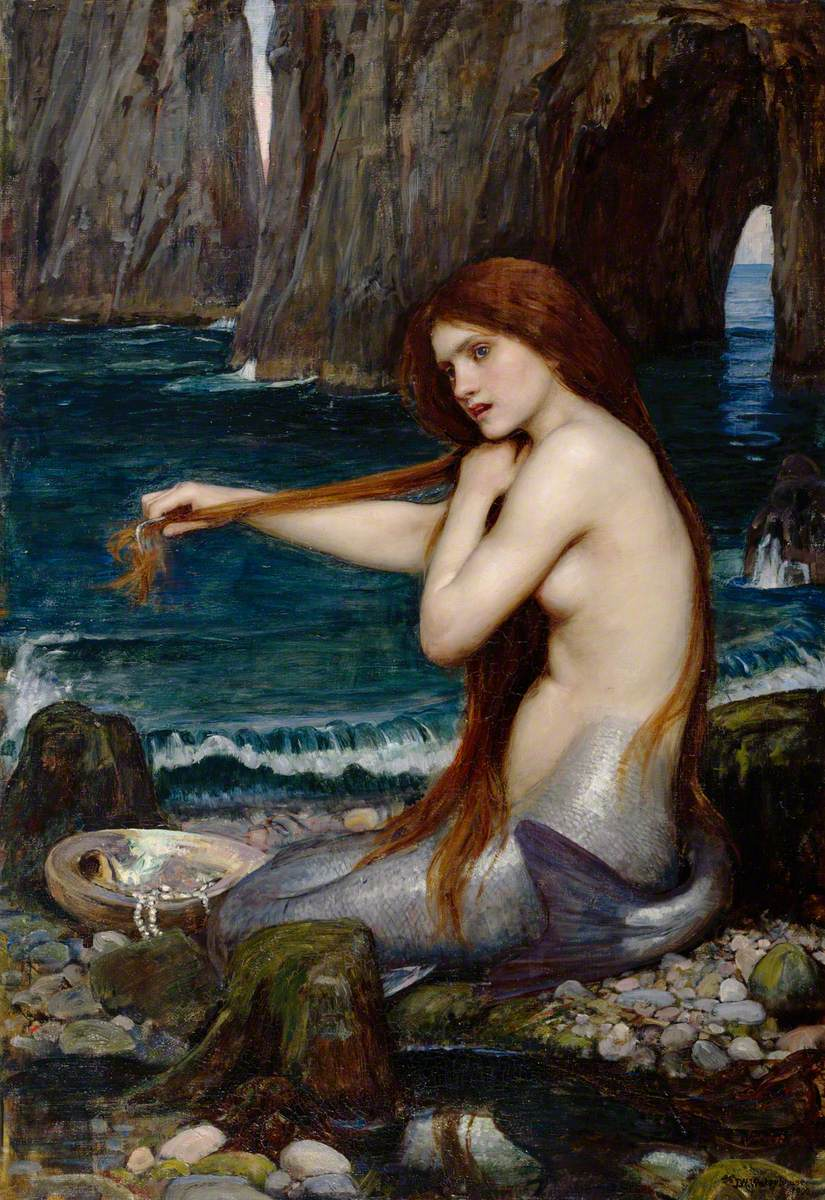
- John William Waterhouse, A Mermaid (1900).

Creature information
- Grouping: Mythological
- Sub grouping: Water spirit

Origin
- Country: Worldwide

In folklore, a mermaid is an aquatic creature with the head and upper body of a female human and the tail of a fish. Mermaids appear in the folklore of many cultures worldwide, including Europe, Latin America, Asia, and Africa.

Mermaids are sometimes associated with perilous events, such as storms, shipwrecks, and drownings (cf. § Omens). In other folk traditions (or sometimes within the same traditions), they can be benevolent or beneficent, bestowing boons, or falling in love with humans.

The male equivalent of the mermaid is the merman, also a familiar figure in folklore and heraldry. Although traditions about and reported sightings of mermen are less common than those of mermaids, they are in folklore generally assumed to co-exist with their female counterparts. The male and the female collectively are sometimes referred to as merfolk or merpeople.

The Western concept of mermaids as beautiful, seductive singers may have been influenced by the sirens of Greek mythology, which were originally half-birdlike, but came to be pictured as half-fishlike in the Christian era. Historical accounts of mermaids, such as those reported by Christopher Columbus during his exploration of the Caribbean, may have been sightings of manatees or similar aquatic mammals. While there is no evidence that mermaids exist outside folklore, reports of mermaid sightings continue to the present day.

Mermaids have been a popular subject of art and literature in the modern era, such as in Hans Christian Andersen's literary fairy tale "The Little Mermaid" (1837). They have subsequently been depicted in operas, paintings, books, comics, animation, and live-action films.

== Etymologies ==
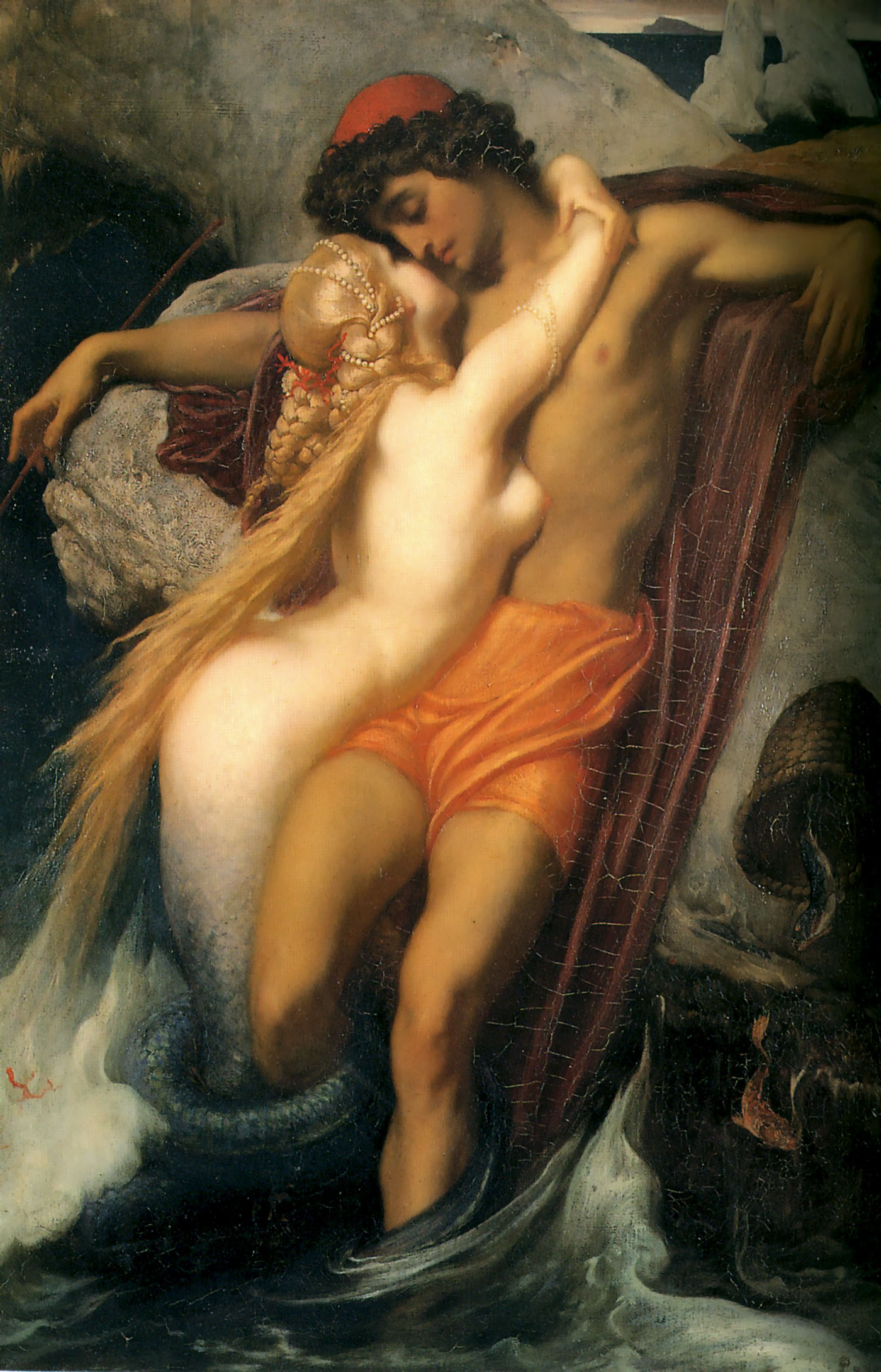
The Fisherman and the Syren, by Frederic Leighton, c. 1856–1858

The English word "mermaid" has its earliest-known attestation in Middle English (Chaucer, Nun's Priest's Tale, c. 1390). The compound word is formed from mere (sea) and maid (young woman).

=== Mermin ===
Another English word "†mermin" (headword in the OED) for 'siren or mermaid' is older, though now obsolete. It derives from Old English męremęnen, ad. męre 'sea' + męnen 'female slave', earliest attestation mereminne, as a gloss for "siren", in Corpus Glossary (c. 725). A Middle English example mereman in a bestiary (dated to 1275–1300) is indeed a 'mermaid', part maiden, part fish-like (Note: British Library Arundel MS 292, fol. 8 verso) (Note: And despite the misleading spelling not a variant of "merman" (first used seventeenh century)) Its Old High German cognate merimenni (Note: The word occurs variously as OHG merimenni, merime^{n}i, meriminni, meriminnun, meriminna, merminno. Schade's dictionary uses OHG "meremanni" as headword.) is known from biblical glosses (Note: They are glosses to sirenes at Isiah 13:21 where Hebrew ya'anah (יִעֲנָה), mod. Eng. bibl. tr. "ostriches" was translated as sirens by the Septuagint and Vulgate.) and Physiologus. (Note: Vienna, Österreichische Nationalbibliothek ms. 223, fol. 32r. Maurer (1967) ed.Der altdeutsche Physiologus [note 37], 92, apud Pakis (2010), p. 126, n37. (olim MS Philol. 244), von der Hagen, F.H. (1824) ed., pp. 52–53.) The Middle High German cognate merminne, (mod. German "meerweib"), "mermaid", is attested in epics, and the one in Rabenschlacht is a great-grandmother of Wittich; (Note: She is Wâchilt, whose great-grandson (German: Urenkel) is Wittich. In other words she is Velent/Wieland's grandmother. or "Wittich's father's father's mother", in the Dietrich Cycle.) this same figure appears in an Old Swedish text a haffru, (Note: Þiðreks saga or "Dietrich's saga". But the great-grandmother's involvement is only known from the Swedish version (Swedish epilogue), from the fifteenth century Swedish reworking.) (Note: She is deemed an 'undine' by one modern commentator.) and in Old Norse a sjókona (siókona [sic.]; "sea-woman"). (Note: Earlier portion of the Old Norse Þiðreks saga.) Old Norse marmennill, -dill, masculine noun, is also listed as cognate to "†mermin", as well as ON margmelli, modern Icelandic marbendill, and modern Norwegian marmæle.

=== Merewif ===
Old English męrewif is another related term, and appears once in reference not so much to a mermaid but a certain sea hag, and not well-attested later. (Note: That is, the OED's entry for gave "cf. OE męrewif and Mermin [in small capitals]", meaning there is an entry for the latter but not the former.) Its MHG cognate merwîp, also defined as "meerweib" in modern German with perhaps "merwoman" a valid English definition. (Note: As "merwoman" is used for merwîp, e.g., at Grimm & Stallybrass tr. (1883), p. 490 re the Nibelungenlied example.) The word is attested, among other medieval epics, in the Nibelungenlied, and rendered "merwoman", "mermaid", "water sprite", or other terms; the two in the story are translated as ON sjókonur ("sea-women").

== Origins ==
The siren of Ancient Greek mythology became conflated with mermaids during the medieval period. Some European Romance languages still use cognate terms for siren to denote the mermaid, e.g., French sirène and Spanish and Italian sirena.

=== Sirens ===
In the early Greek period, the sirens were conceived of as human-headed birds, but by the classical period, Greek art sporadically depicted the siren as part fish. (Note: The Megarian bowl, third century BC, with a scene from the Odyssey, with sirens depicted as fish-tailed "tritonesses". Harrison names a clay lamp, possibly from the Roman period. A terracotta "mourning siren", 250 BC, is the oldest representation of siren as mermaid familiar to Waugh.)

==== Medieval sirens as mermaids ====
Sirens in Physiologus and bestiaries

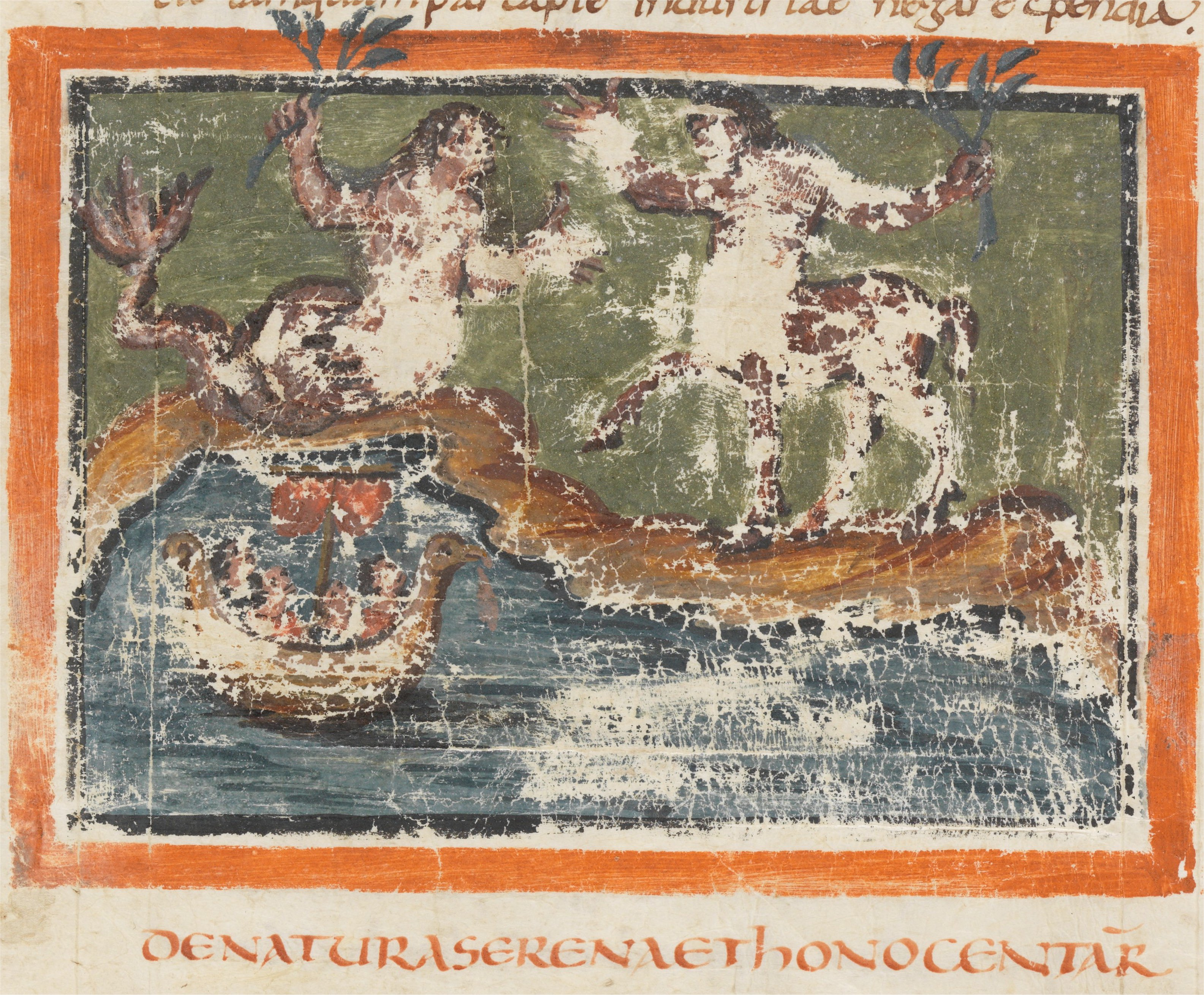
Siren and onocentaur.
―Bern Physiologus. Berner Burgerbibliothek, Cod. 281, fol. 13v

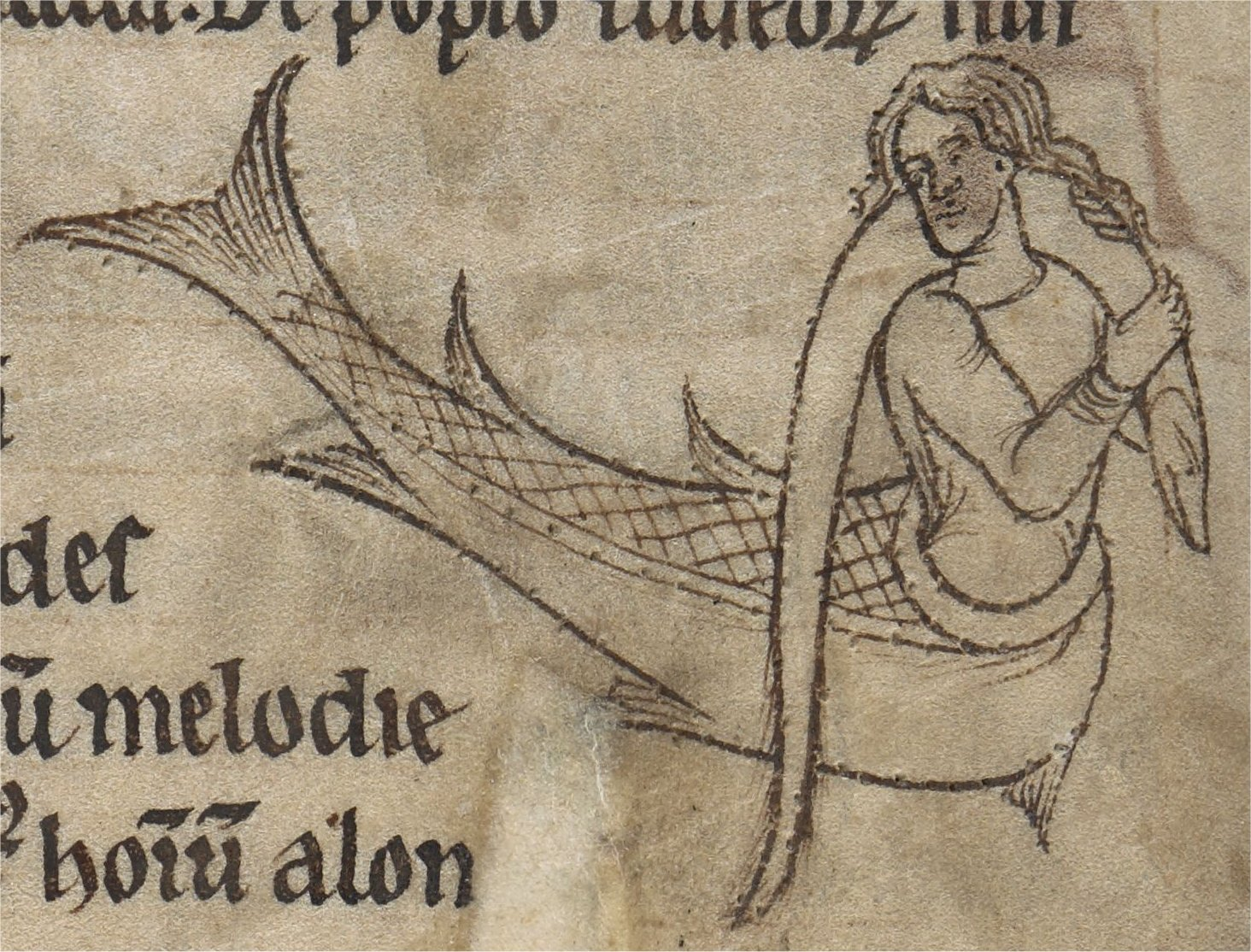
Siren in a Second Family bestiary
―British Library MS Add. 11283, fol. 20v.

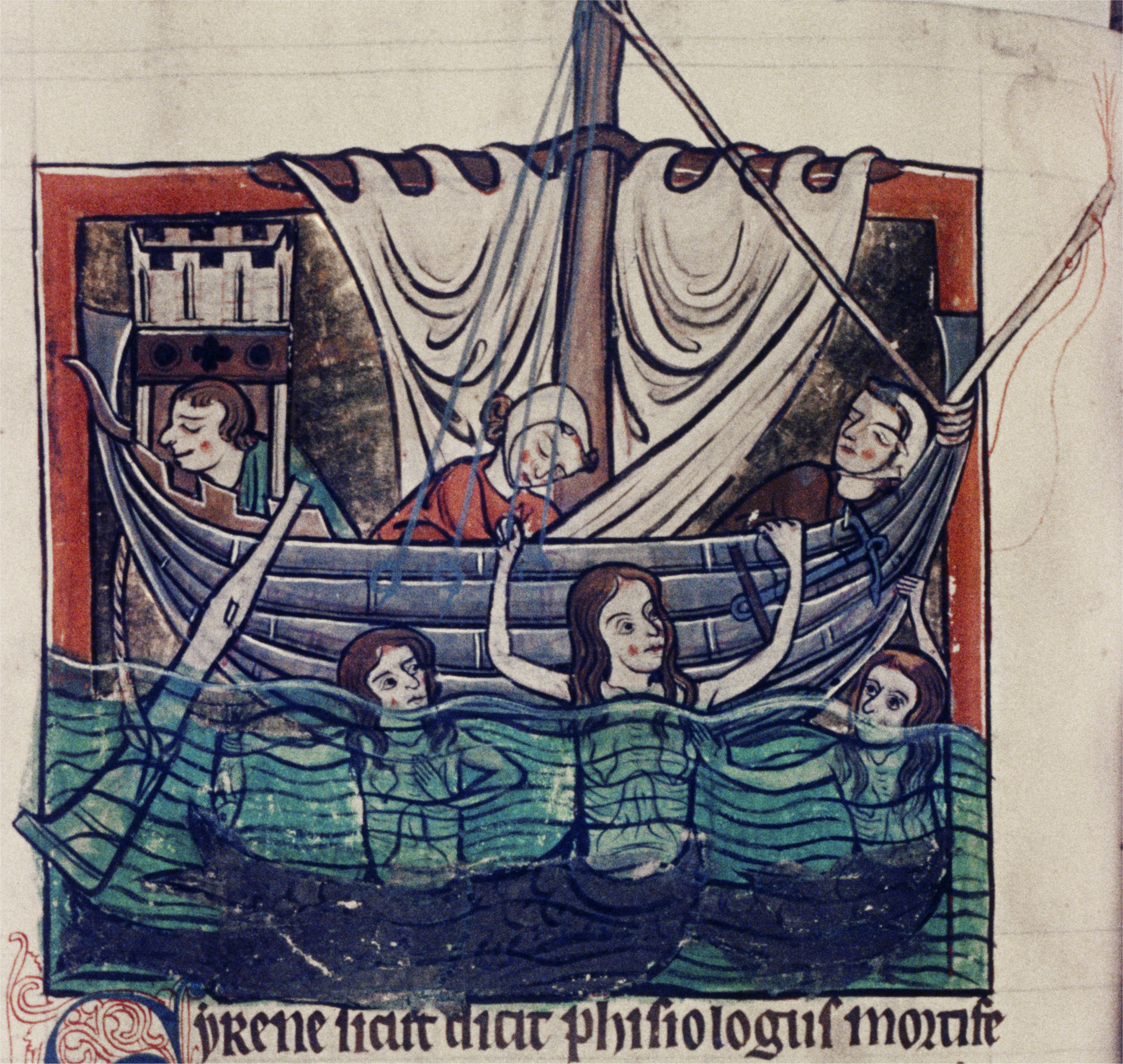
Sirens swimming in sea.
―Bestiary (Bodl. 764), fol. 74v
© Bodleian Libraries, University of Oxford

The siren's part-fish appearance became increasingly popular during the Middle Ages. The traits of the classical sirens, such as using their beautiful song as a lure as told by Homer, have often been transferred to mermaids.

This change of the medieval siren from bird to fish were thought by some to be the influence of Germanic myth, later expounded in literary legends of Lorelei and Undine; though a dissenting comment is that parallels are not limited to Teutonic culture.

==== Textual attestations ====
The earliest text describing the siren as fish-tailed occurs in the Liber Monstrorum de diversis generibus (seventh to mid-eighth century), which described sirens as "sea girls" (marinae pullae) whose beauty in form and sweet song allure seafarers, but beneath the human head and torso, have the scaly tail-end of a fish with which they can navigate the sea. (Note: Faral (1953), pp. 441ff., cited by McCulloch (1962) [1960], p. 167.) (Note: Pakis (2010), p. 137 and n89;Holford-Strevens (2006), p. 29 (both quote from the Orchard (2003) translation.).) "Sirens are mermaids" (Old High German/Early Middle High German: Sirêne sínt méremanniu) may be suggested in the aforementioned Old German Physiologus (eleventh century). (Note: Pakis (2010), p. 126, note 39 gives "Siręne sint meremanniu" citing Maurer ed. (1967), the Titus Project transcription is verifiable against the image of the manuscript, fol. 32r.) (Note: Since the OHG word only means "sea-woman", it is not assured that a fish-tailed being is meant.) The Middle English bestiary (mid-13th century) clearly means "mermaid" when it explains the siren to be a mereman, stating that she has a body and breast like that of a maiden but joined, at the navel, by a body part which is definitely fish, with fins growing out of her. Old French verse bestiaries (e.g. Philipp de Thaun's version, written c. 1121–1139) also accommodated by stating that a part of the siren may be bird or fish.

==== Iconographic attestations ====
In a ninth-century Physiologus manufactured in France (Fig., top left), (Note: The Bern Physiologus. fol. 13v. Rubric: "De natura serena et honocentauri". Produced c. 830, Hautvillers Abbey near Reims, France.) the siren was illustrated as a "woman-fish", i.e., mermaid-like, despite being described as bird-like in the text. The Bodleian bestiary dated 1220–12 also pictures a group of fish-tailed mermaid-like sirens (Fig. bottom), contradicting its text which likens it to a winged fowl (volatilis habet figuram) down to their feet. (Note: Oxford, MS Bodley 764, fol. 74v.) In the interim, the siren as pure mermaid was becoming commonplace, particularly in the so-called "Second Family" Latin bestiaries, as represented in one of the early manuscripts classified into this group (Additional manuscript 11283, c. 1170–1180s. Fig., top right).

==== Mirror and comb ====
While the siren holding a fish was a commonplace theme, the siren in bestiaries were also sometimes depicted holding the comb, (Note: Cf. three sirens with two holding fish and third a mirror, as in Getty MS. 100 (olim Alnwick ms.)) or the mirror. (Note: British Library Ms. Royal 2.B.Vii, fol. 96v.) The comb and mirror became a persistent symbol of the siren-mermaid. In the Christian moralizing context (e.g the bestiaries), the mermaid's mirror and comb were held as the symbol of vanity. (Note: In the bestiaries. And that is generally accepted to be the intended symbolism in ecclesiastical art, such as church carvings of mermaids, but this church view has been derided as misogynistic from a modern perspective, and it has been noted that the mirror and comb were originally the accoutrements of the love goddess Venus in Classical Times.)

=== Other Greek mythical figures ===
The sea-monsters Scylla and Charybdis, who lived near the sirens, were also female and had some fishlike attributes. Though Scylla's violence is contrasted with the sirens' seductive ways by certain classical writers, Scylla and Charybdis lived near the sirens' domain. (Note: In The Odyssey, after Odysseus' encounter with the sirens, he headed for the place where Scylla and Charybdis dwelled.) In Etruscan art before the sixth century BC, Scylla was portrayed as a mermaid-like creature with two tails. This may be tied to images of two-tailed mermaids ranging from ancient times to modern depictions, and is sometimes attached to the later character of Melusine. (Note: Bain (2017), citing Terry Pearson and Françoise Clier-Colombani.) A sporadic example of sirens as mermaids (tritonesses) in Early Greek art (third century BC), can be explained as the contamination of the siren myth with Scylla and Charybdis.

The female Oceanids, Nereids and Naiads are mythical water nymphs, although they were generally depicted without fish tails. "Nereid" and "nymph" have also been applied to actual mermaid-like marine creatures purported to exist, from Pliny (cf. §Roman Lusitania and Gaul) and onwards. Jane Ellen Harrison (1882) has speculated that the mermaids or tritonesses of Greek and Roman mythology may have been brought from the Middle East, possibly transmitted by Phoenician mariners.

The Greek god Triton had two fish tails instead of legs. The prophetic sea deity Glaucus was also depicted with a fish tail.

According to Dorothy Dinnerstein, human-animal hybrids such as mermaids and minotaurs convey the emergent understanding of ancient peoples that humans were both one with and different from animals:

[Human] nature is internally inconsistent, that our continuities with, and our differences from, the earth's other animals are mysterious and profound; and in these continuities, and these differences, lie both a sense of strangeness on earth and the possible key to a way of feeling at home here.

=== Ancient Middle Eastern mythology ===
==== Kulullû ====
Depictions of entities with the upper bodies of humans and the tails of fish appear in Mesopotamian artwork from the Old Babylonian Period onwards, on cylinder seals. These figures are usually mermen (kulullû), but mermaids do occasionally appear. The name for the mermaid figure may have been *kuliltu, meaning "fish-woman". Such figures were used in Neo-Assyrian art as protective figures and were shown in both monumental sculpture and in small, protective figurines.

==== Syrian mermaid goddess ====
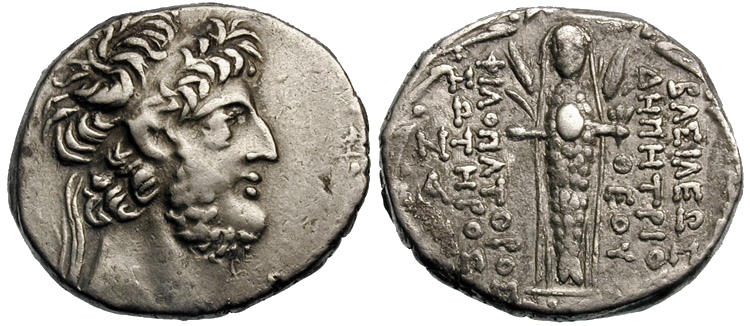
Atargatis depicted as a fish with a woman's head, on a coin of Demetrius III

A mermaid-like goddess, identified by Greek and Roman writers as Derceto or Atargatis, was worshipped at Ashkelon. In a myth recounted by Diodorus Siculus in the first century BC, Derceto gave birth to a child from an affair. Ashamed, she abandoned the child in the desert and drowned herself in a lake, only to be transformed into a human-headed fish. The child, Semiramis, was fed by doves and survived to become a queen. In the second century, Lucian described seeing a Phoenician statue of Derceto with the upper body of a woman and the tail of a fish. He noted the contrast with the grand statue located at her Holy City (Hierapolis Bambyce), which appeared entirely human. (Note: Lucian. De Dea Syria 14. Lightfoot ed., tr. (2003). Cited and translation quoted by Hasan-Rokem (2014), p. 182.)

In the myth, Semiramis's first husband is named Onnes. Some scholars have compared this to the earlier Mesopotamian myth of Oannes, one of the apkallu or seven sages described as fish-men in cuneiform texts. (Note: Oannes was later described by the Babylonian writer Berossus as having an extra human head beneath the head of its fish body.) While Oannes was a servant of the water deity Ea, having gained wisdom from the god, English writer Arthur Waugh understood Oannes to be equivalent to Ea, and proposed that surely "Oannes had a fish-tailed wife" and descendants, with Atargatis being one deity thus descended, "through the mists of time".

Diodorus's chronology of Queen Semiramis resembles the feats of Alexander the Great (campaigns to India, etc.), and Diodorus may have woven the Macedonian king's material via some unnamed source. There is a mermaid legend attached to Alexander the Great's sister, but this is of post-medieval vintage (see below).

=== Rational attempts at explanation ===
Sometime before 546 BC, Milesian philosopher Anaximander postulated that mankind had sprung from an aquatic animal species, a theory that is sometimes called the Aquatic Ape Theory. He thought that humans, who begin life with prolonged infancy, could not have survived otherwise.

Naturalistic theories on the origins of the mermaid postulate that they derive from sightings of manatees, dugongs or even seals. Another theory, tangentially related to the aforementioned Aquatic Ape Theory, is that the mermaids of folklore were actually human women who trained over time to be skilled divers for things like sponges, and spent a lot of time in the sea as a result. A proponent of this theory is the British author William Bond, who has written several books about it.

== Medieval literature ==
=== Merwomen in Germanic literature ===
Nibelungenlied

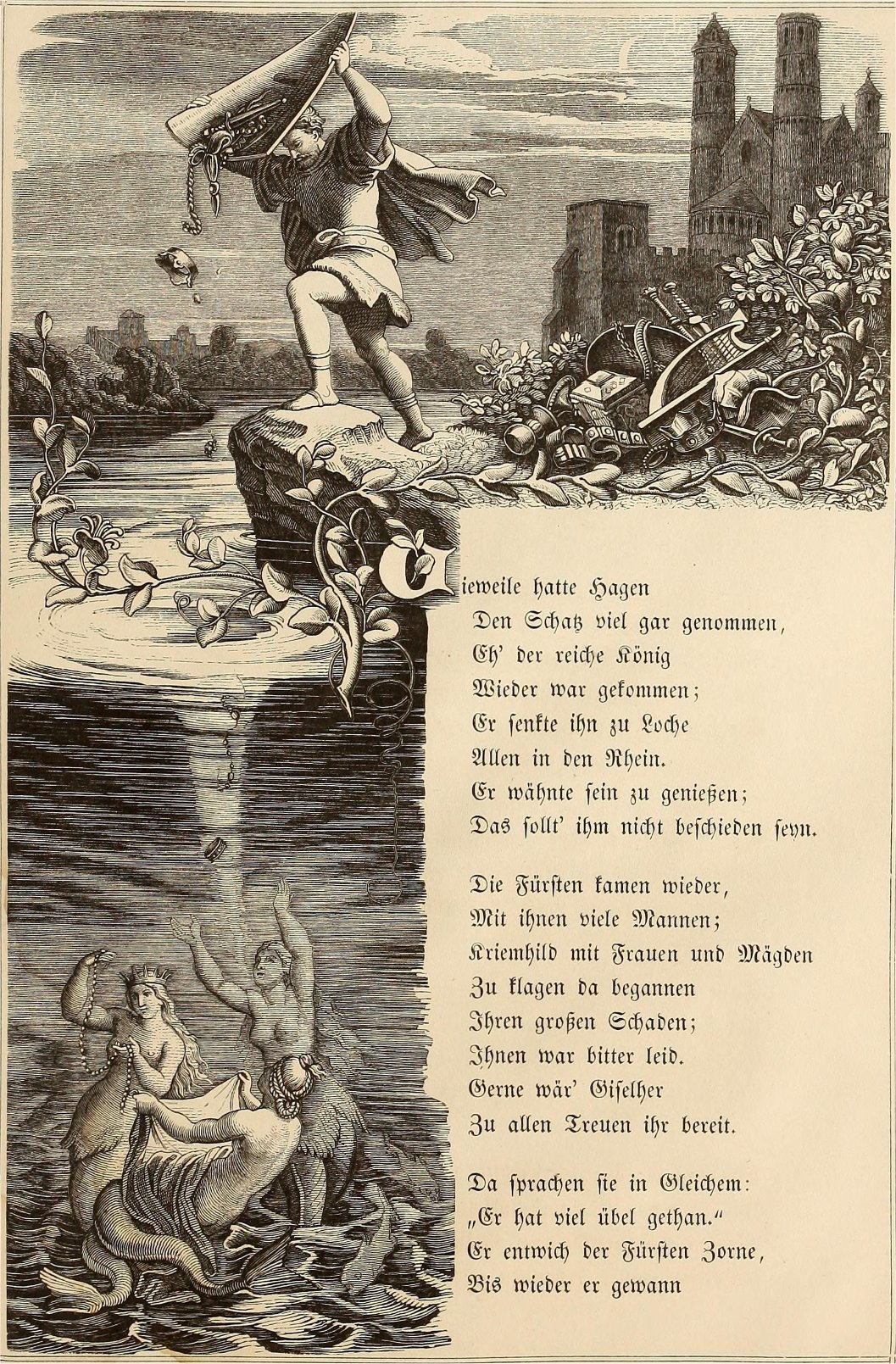
Hagen unloads Nibelungen treasure where the Rhine mermaids await. Adventure 19.

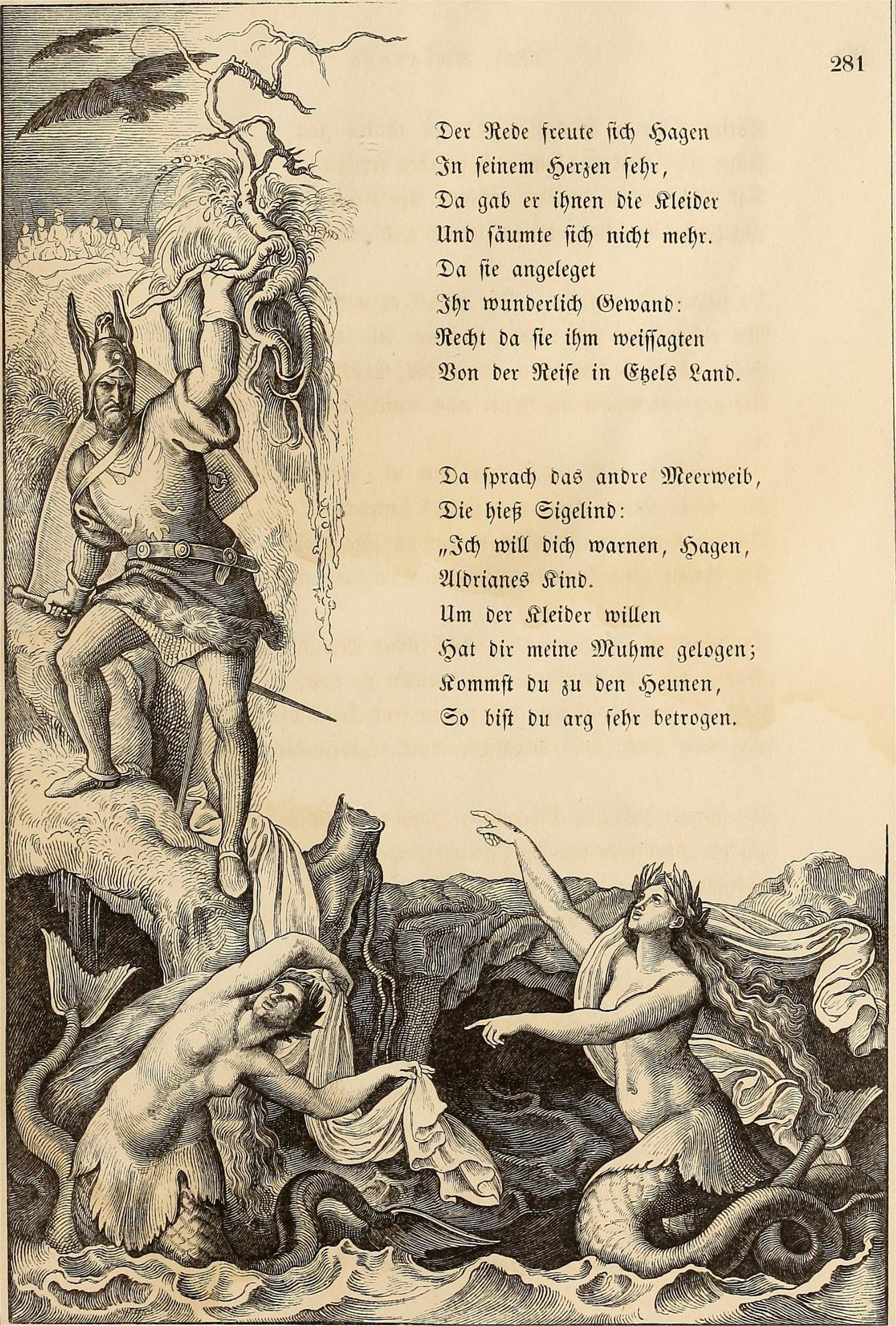
Hagen with the prophetic mermaids, Hadeburg and Sigelind. Adventure 25.

—Pfizer ed. (1843) Nibelungen noth. Wooodcuts by Julius Schnorr von Carolsfeld and Eugen Napoleon Neureuther.

==== Nibelungenlied ====
Two prophetic merwomen (MHG pl.: merwîp), Sigelinde (MHG: Sigelint) and her maternal aunt Hadeburg (MHG: Hadeburc) are bathing in the Danube River (Note: But perhaps not too far from the meadows opposite the Rhine River where they pitched camp in an earlier passage in the Nibelungenlied, and occurs at the confluence of the Rhine and the Danube in Þiðreks saga, hence Wagner's reinvention of them as Rhinemaidens.) when Hagen von Tronje encounters them (Nibelungenlied, Âventiure 25).

They are called sjókonar ("sea women") in the Old Norse Þiđreks saga. There is a swan maiden tale motif involved here (Hagen robs their clothing), but Grimm argued they must have actually been swan maidens, since they are described as hovering above water.

In any case, this brief segment became the "foundational" groundwork of subsequent water-nix lore and literature that developed in the Germanic sphere.

They are a probable source of the three Rhine maidens in Richard Wagner's opera Das Rheingold. Though conceived of as swan-maidens in Wagner's 1848 scenario, the number being a threesome was suggested by the woodcut by Julius Schnorr von Carolsfeld and Eugen Napoleon Neureuther in the Pfizer edition of 1843 (fig. on the left).

==== Rabenschlacht ====
Middle High German mereminne 'mermaid' is mentioned, among other epics, in the Rabenschlacht ("Battle of Ravenna", 13th cent.) of the Dietrich cycle. The mermaid (or undine) is named Wâchilt and is the ancestress (Note: MHG: ane; modern German: Ahn.) of the traitorous Wittich who carries him off at the time of peril to her "submarine home". This material has been found translated as a medieval Þiðreks saga only in a late, reworked Swedish version, i.e., one of the closing chapters of Ðiðriks saga (fifteenth century, also known as the "Swedish epilogue"). The mermaid/undine is here translated as Old Swedish haffru.

The Old Norse Þiðreks saga proper (Note: The so-called Vilkinasaga ends before this chapter, according to Bertelsen's notes. But Þiðreks saga was frequently referred to as Vilkina saga by early commentators.) calls the same mermaid a sjókona (siókona [sic.]) or "sea-woman". (Note: Or Ger. Meerfrau.) The genealogy is given in the saga: the sea-woman and Villcinus (Vilkinus), king of Scandinavia together had a son, Vaði (Wade) of (Sjóland=Sjælland, Zealand) who was a giant (risi); whose son was Velent (Wayland the Smith), whose son after that was Viðga Velentsson (Wittich or Witige), who became a companion/champion of King Þiðrekr (Dietrich von Bern).

Thus the saga is an early source which associates a famed clan of merfolk with a place in Denmark, Sjælland. This was the divided portion of Villcina-land inherited by the bastard prince Vaði/Wade according to the saga. The Swedish epilogue transposed the locations concerning the battle (from Italy to Germany), and claimed the rescued Viðga/Witige was brought to Sjælland. That is to say, the crucial battle had been in Ravenna, Northern Italy in the German epic Rabenschlacht), but the battle spot was changed to Gronsport, somewhere on the Moselle, in Northern Germany in the Swedish version. (Note: Identification of Gronsport with a specific modern city has not been made; von Der Hagens tr. (1855) Wilkina- und Niflunga-Saga oder Dietrich von Bern und die Nibelungen, III: 267n states he doesn't know.)

== Folkore worldwide ==
The mermaid is a harbinger of shipwreck in English-Scottish balladry, though the attestation (Child ballad 289), dates no older than the 18th century. No analogues were found by Child outside the English language, though versions were transmitted to America. In Norway the havfrue was considered the harbinger of "storm and bad weather" The notion of the mermaid's signifying bad omen is both Western and Eastern. A number of such omens were recorded in Japan by the Kamakura shogunate, for example, the entry in the Azuma kagami for year 1247 (Hōji 1) records a beaching of a "big fish" (as it was called here), tied to the Battle of Hōji the same year.

== Folklore of Britain and Ireland ==
The Norman chapel in Durham Castle, built around 1078, has what is probably the earliest surviving artistic depiction of a mermaid in England. It can be seen on a south-facing capital above one of the original Norman stone pillars.

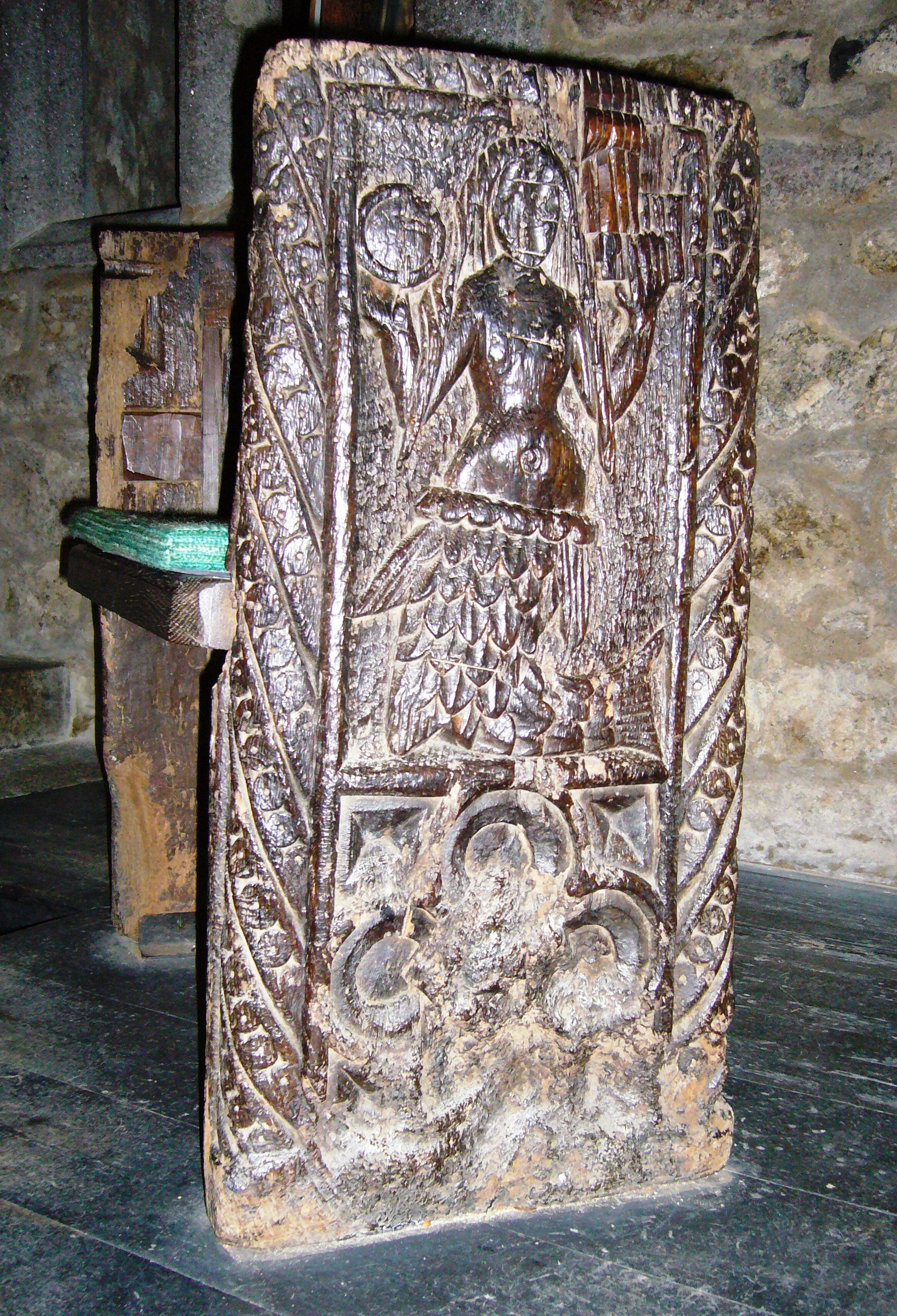
Mermaid carving on a bench end, Zennor, Cornwall

Mermaids appear in British folklore as unlucky omens, both foretelling disaster and provoking it. Several variants of the ballad Sir Patrick Spens depict a mermaid speaking to the doomed ships. In some versions, she tells them they will never see land again; in others, she claims they are near shore, which they are wise enough to know means the same thing. Mermaids can also be a sign of approaching rough weather, and some have been described as monstrous in size, up to 2,000 feet (610 m).

In another short ballad, "Clerk Colvill" (Child ballad No. 42), the mermaid seduces the title character and foretells his doom. It has been surmised that in the original complete version, the man was being penalized for spurning her, though the Scandinavian counterparts that tells the complete story feature an elf-woman or elf queen rather than mermaid. In "The Mermaid" (Child ballad 289), her sighting forebodes a vessel's deadly shipwreck.

Mermaids have been described as able to swim up rivers to freshwater lakes. In one story, the Laird of Lorntie went to aid a woman he thought was drowning in a lake near his house; his servant pulled him back, warning that it was a mermaid, and the mermaid screamed at them that she would have killed him if it were not for his servant. But mermaids could occasionally be more beneficent; e.g., teaching humans cures for certain diseases. Mermen have been described as wilder and uglier than mermaids, with little interest in humans.

According to legend a mermaid came to the Cornish village of Zennor, where she used to listen to the singing of a chorister, Matthew Trewhella. The two fell in love, and Matthew went with the mermaid to her home at Pendour Cove. On summer nights, the lovers can be heard singing together. The legend, recorded by folklorist William Bottrell, stems from a fifteenth-century mermaid carving on a wooden bench at the Church of Saint Senara in Zennor. Some tales raised the question of whether mermaids had immortal souls, answering in the negative.

In Scottish mythology, a ceasg is a freshwater mermaid, though little beside the term has been preserved in folklore. Mermaids from the Isle of Man, known as ben-varrey, are considered more favorable toward humans than those of other regions, with various accounts of assistance, gifts and rewards. One story tells of a fisherman who carried a stranded mermaid back into the sea and was rewarded with the location of treasure. Another recounts the tale of a baby mermaid who stole a doll from a human little girl, but was rebuked by her mother and sent back to the girl with a gift of a pearl necklace to atone for the theft. A third story tells of a fishing family that made regular gifts of apples to a mermaid and was rewarded with prosperity. In Irish lore, Lí Ban was a human being transformed into a mermaid. After three centuries, when Christianity came to Ireland, she was baptised.

== Scandinavian folklore ==
=== Haffrue ===
The mermaid corresponds to Danish and Bokmål Norwegian havfrue, whereas merman answers to Danish/Norwegian havmand. (Note: Tracing this etymologically to Old Norse is elusive. Old Swedish haffru was used as a translation word in the Sweidish saga of Didrik (14 cent.) as mentioned under §Etymologies.) As a side-note, a supposed Old Norse haffrú is the etymological source of Norman French havette for a man-snatching water-sprite, according to one linguist. (Note: Wartburg, Walther von (1922-) Französisches etymologisches Wörterbuch, XVI: 112, searchable index, translated by Gorog, in his supplementary list of Norman words borrowed from Old Norse which were missed by Fries, Jan de (1962). Altnordisches etymologisches Wörterbuch.) (Note: The initial "h" is an aspirated h here could very well be pronounced, even in modern Normandy, especially for words borrowed from the Germanic, as Gorog points out elsewhere. Wartburg (Gorog tr.) glosses "navette" as "sort of water-sprite (ondine) which attracts passers-by at night.. and plunges in with them", adding that in the patois of Valognes, it is used as a bugbear to frighten children from approaching water.)

An early description of the Havfrue, and her mate Havmand, was given by the Danish Bishop Pontoppidan (1753). They were considered the mating female and male of the creature, inhabiting the North Sea, and their offspring was called marmæle (var. marmæte), as repeated by later commentators. Though he was aware of fabulous fables being told about them, (Note: And documented some of these fables, as the mermaid purportedly foretelling the birth of Christian IV.) he was convinced such creature existed. But as they were non-human, he argued the term Havmand (merman) should be avoided, in favor of some coined term such as sea-ape (Danish: hav-abe). (Note: Or even the eccentric "Sea-Quoyas Morrov", after apparently the native Angolan name for some ape, because a mermaid capture in Angola was also documented.) He also knowingly employed Old Norwegian/Old Norse maryge [sic.] and hafstrambe [sic.] (Note: Recté margýgr and hafstrambr, as described below) as the Norwegian names of the mermaid and merman respectively.

The Icelandic cognate form is haffrú with several synonyms, (Note: margýgur, hafgygur ('mer-troll'), haffrú ('sea-maid'); mey-fiskr ('maiden-fish').) though instead of these the commonly used term today is hafmey. The Faroese forms are havfrúgv (havfrúg). The Swedish form is hafsfru, with other synonyms such as sjöjungfru, (Note: In Sweden also and sjö-kona (sjö-kuna in the dialect of Ruhnu, Estonia).) or sjörå ('sea-fairy', the maritime counterpart of the forest skogsrå).

=== Other aliases ===
The terms margýgur or havgýgur as aliases for mermaid were apparently current among the populace in modern-age Iceland, according to Jón Árnason (Note: Though he is clearly dependent on past written literature also, e.g. Jón Guðmundsson the Learned (d. 1658), who also classified the mermen/mermaids among elves.) alongside the marbendill (modern Icelandic for ON marmennill). Benjamin Thorpe (1851) writing on Norwegian folklore gave margygr for mermaid (and marmennill for merman) as Norwegian folk terms, (Note: And also Bassett (1892), p. 172) but these are interpolations, which the source, Andreas Faye's Norske sagn (1833), (Note: Thorpe, identifies Faye as the general source on p. 9, note 2. .) only side-noted as occurrences of old terms in medieval literature.

=== General characteristics ===
The beautiful havfrue of Scandinavia may be benevolent or malicious, and legends about her abducting maidens (cf. infra) is given as a case of point for her malice. It is said the havfrue will avenge harm done to it, as in the Norwegian anecdote of one who was lured near the ship, and had her hand cruelly lopped off on the gunwale. She caused a storm that nearly drowned the wicked sailor.

=== Omen, prophecy and wisdom ===
The appearance/sighting alone betides an impending storm. Norwegians do not wish to see the havfrue, as she heralds storm or bad weather (Norway). The appearance of the sjörå forebodes a storm or poor catch in Swedish tradition, much as the appearance of the skogsrå (wood-nymph) presages poor catch for the hunter. According to the superstitions of Swedish fishermen, if one saw a sjörå who was harbinger of tempest and bad catch, one should not tell his comrades but strike flint against steel to light a spark.

In other cases the Scandinavian mermaid is considered to be prophetic. The tale type "The Mermaid's Message" (Norwegian: Havfruas spådom, ML 4060) is recognized as a Migratory Legend, i.e., a group of tales found in Scandinavia with parallels found elsewhere, according to the scheme devised by Reidar Thoralf Christiansen. This may not necessarily involve the mermaid's spaeing, and in the following example of this ML type tale, she merely imparts wisdom: A fisherman who performs favors and earns the privilege to pose three questions to a mermaid. He inquires about the most suitable material for a flail, to which she answers calf's hide, of course, and tells him he should have asked about how to brew water (into beer), which would have benefited him more greatly.

=== Merfolk as abductors ===
The Swedish ballad "Hafsfrun" (≈Havsfruns tärna, SMB 23, TSB A 51) is an instance where a mermaid kidnaps a human girl at age fifteen, and when the girl's brother accomplishes the rescue, the mermaid declares she would have cracked (Note: The original text gives knäckt (i.e. cracked), rather than kneckt or knackt.) her neck if she knew she would be thus betrayed. (Note: Folksong text published by Adolf Ivar Arwidsson, discussed by Grimm and Keightley.) The Swedish merman Hafsman[nen] steals a human woman to become his bride according to folklore. (Note: The Swedish ballad "Hafsmannen" is based on the abduction theme, and recounts the same myth as Danish ballad "Rosmer Havmand".)

=== Marmaele ===
As aforementioned, the mermaid (Norwegian: havfrue) takes the merman (Norwegian: havmand) for husband, and produce children called marmæler (sing. Norwegian: marmæle, "sea-talkers"), which the fishermen sometimes bring home to gain insight into the future. Early sources say that Norwegian fishermen who capture the marmæte or marmæle may bring them home but do not dare keep it for more than 24 hours before turning them back into the sea whence they found it.

=== Margýgr ===
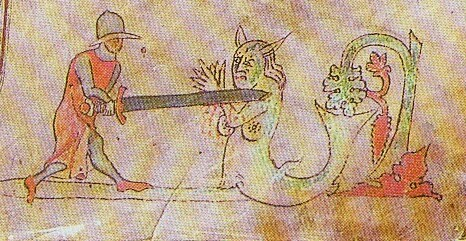
The margýgr vs. St. Olaf (Note: Facsimiles of the miniature painting are found in Fridtjof Nansen's book and Dubois's paper.) ―Flateyjarbk fol. 79r

Jón Árnason describes the margýgur as yellow-haired woman who is fish from the waist down, who drags careless seamen to the depths of the sea. However, margygr literally means something like "mer-troll", and in medieval tradition, the margygr is more of a "sea monster" or "sea-ogress". (Note: Also "giantess who emerges from the sea", and "described.. as disgusting trolls".)

According to a version of the Saga of St. Olaf (Olaf II of Norway) the king encountered a margygr whose singing lulled voyagers to sleep causing them to drown and whose high-pitched shrieks drove men insane. Her physical appearance is described thus: "She has a head like a horse, with ears erect and distended nostrils, big green eyes and fearful jaws. She has shoulders like a horse and hands in front; but behind she resembles a serpent". This margygr was also said to be furry like a seal, and gray-colored.

== Western European folklore ==
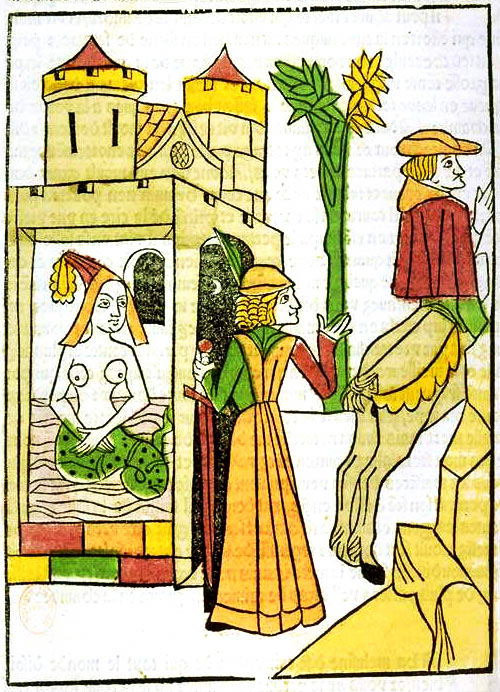
Raymond discovers Melusine in her bath, Jean d'Arras, Le livre de Mélusine, 1478.

Melusine is a mermaid-like character from European folklore, cursed to take the form of a serpent from the waist down. Later depictions sometimes changed this to a fish tail. At some point, possibly in the late nineteenth century, her name became attached to the two-tailed mermaid of heraldry.

The alchemist Paracelsus's treatise A Book on Nymphs, Sylphs, Pygmies, and Salamanders, and on the Other Spirits (1566) spawned the idea that the water elemental (or water sprite) could acquire an immortal soul through marriage with a human; this led to the writing of De la Motte Fouqué's novella Undine, and eventually to the famous literary mermaid tale, Hans Christian Andersen's "The Little Mermaid".

During the Romanesque period, mermaids were often associated with lust.

== Byzantine and Ottoman Greek folklore ==
The conception of the siren as both a mermaid-like creature and part bird-like persisted in Byzantine Greece for some time. The Physiologus began switching the illustration of the siren as that a mermaid, as in a version dated to the ninth century. The tenth century Byzantine Greek dictionary Suda still favored the avian description.

There is a modern Greek legend that Alexander the Great's sister Thessalonike turned into a mermaid (Greek: γοργόνα) after her death, living in the Aegean. She would ask the sailors on any ship she encountered only one question: "Is King Alexander alive?",(Greek: "Ζει ο Βασιλεύς Αλέξανδρος;") to which the correct answer was: "He lives and reigns and conquers the world" (Greek: "Ζει και βασιλεύει και τον κόσμον κυριεύει"). This answer would please her, and she would accordingly calm the waters and bid the ship farewell. Any other answer would enrage her, and she would stir up a terrible storm, dooming the ship and every sailor on board. This legend derives from an Alexander romance entitled the Phylláda tou Megaléxandrou (Φυλλάδα του Μεγαλέξανδρου) dating to the Ottoman Greece period, first printed in 1680.

== Eastern Europe ==
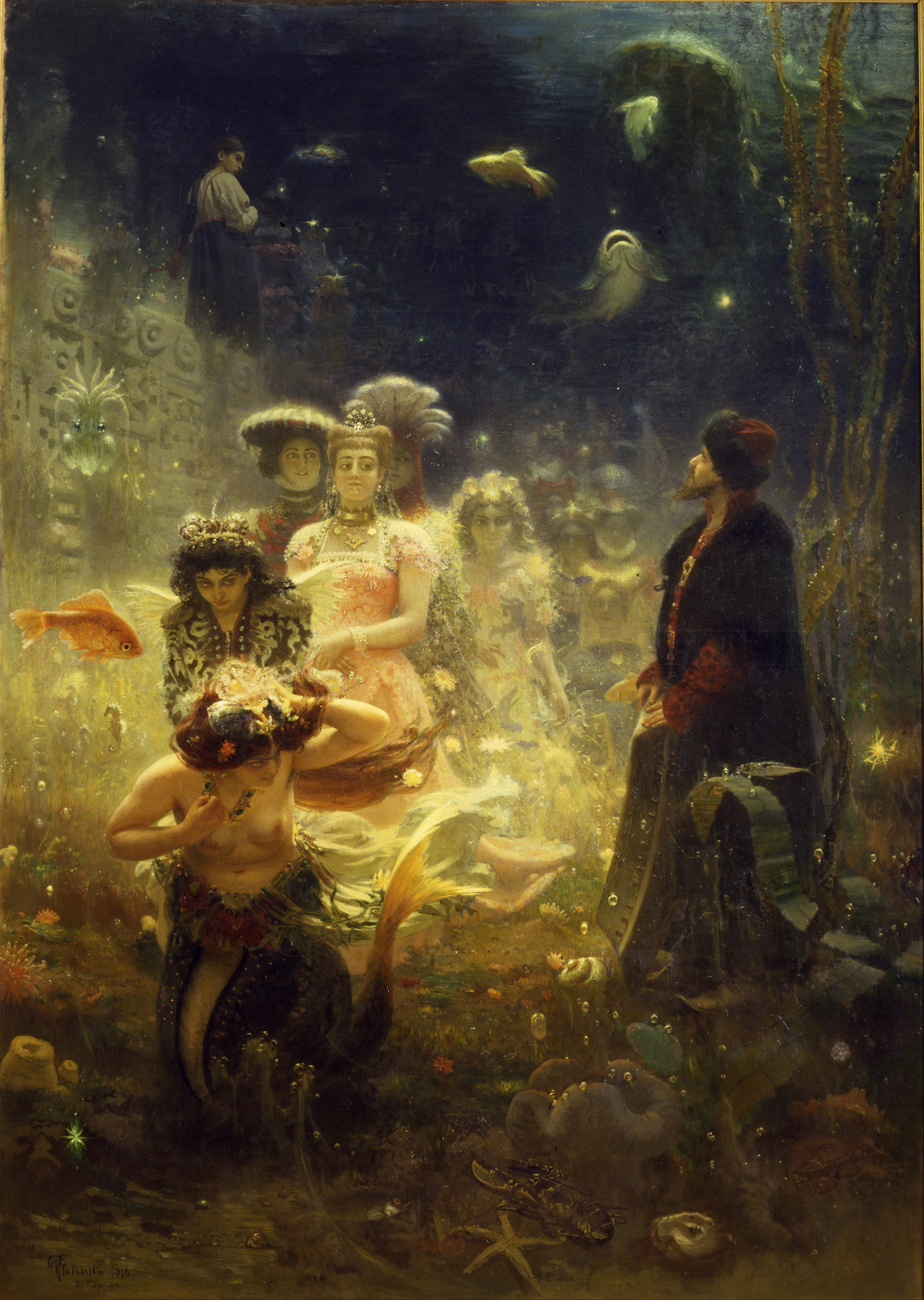
Ilya Repin, Sadko (1876)

Rusalkas are the Slavic counterpart of the Greek sirens and naiads, often seducing sailors to their doom. The nature of rusalkas varies among folk traditions, but according to ethnologist D.K. Zelenin they all share a common element: they are the restless spirits of the unclean dead. They are usually the ghosts of young women who died a violent or untimely death, either by murder or suicide, before their wedding, especially by drowning. Rusalkas are said to inhabit lakes and rivers. They appear as beautiful young women with long pale green hair and pale skin, suggesting a connection with floating weeds and days spent underwater in faint sunlight. They can be seen after dark, dancing together under the moon and calling out to young men by name, luring them to the water and drowning them. The characterization of rusalkas as both desirable and treacherous is prevalent in Russia, Ukraine and Belarus, and was emphasized by nineteenth-century Russian authors.

In Sadko (Russian: Садко), a Russian oral epic poem (bylina), the title character—an adventurer, merchant, and gusli musician from Novgorod—lives for some time in the underwater court of the Sea Tsar and marries his daughter, Chernava, before finally returning home. The tale inspired such works as the poem Sadko by Alexei Tolstoy, the opera Sadko composed by Nikolai Rimsky-Korsakov, and the painting Sadko by Ilya Repin.

== Chinese folklore ==
A merfolk race called the Di people are described as populating its own nation in the Shanhaijing (Classic of Mountains and Seas) compilation of Chinese geography and mythology, dating from the fourth century BC. The ancient work also included several types of human-headed fish, such as the chiru or "red ru fish"; as well as creature with some humanlike qualities like the renyu (人魚) or "human-fish".

There is an account of the hairenyu(海人魚; literally "sea human fish"), given in the Taiping guangji compilation, sourced from the work entitled Qiawenji (洽聞記). The female of its kind had a head like beautiful woman's, with hair like a horse's tail, and white skin like jade without scales, covered with multicolored downy hair (or peach fuzz), and legless. The male and female had sexual organs like humans, so that widows and widowers would keep them in their ponds, and the creatures could perform sexual intercourse normally as a human would. (Note: The anecdote is set in Donghai or "Eastern Sea" which designates "East China Sea" on a modern atlas (and this is given in Magnani's translation), but is "Eastern Sea" given by Groot translating this passage. Historically, the name could apply to the Sea of Japan.)

An anecdote considered relevant concerns a renyu ("human fish") allegedly seen by the ship carrying Zha Dao (査道), and emissary to Korea. She had an unkempt hairdo and scarlet mane extending to the back of her elbows. Zha ordered the crew to bring her aboard with poles, but she escaped. Zha explained that she was a renyu, adept at copulating with humans, and was a type of human dwelling in the sea. The anecdote in the lost Cuyiji ("Records of Bygone Extraordinary Things") from the Northern Song period, survives in quotes, e.g., from leishu compilation Gujin tushu jicheng (古今圖書集成 "Comprehensive Compendium of Illustrations and Books, Ancient and Modern").

== Korean folklore ==
Korea is bound on three sides by the sea. In some villages near the sea in Korea, there are mysterious stories about mermaids. Mermaids have features just like humans. Kim Dam Ryeong, a mayor of the town, saved four captured mermaids from a fisherman, as recorded in the Eou yadam (unofficial histories). In Dongabaek Island of Busan is a tale of Princess Hwang-ok from Naranda, a mythical undersea kingdom of mermaids; this tale is based on the historical Heo Hwang-ok from India. Another tale concerns a mermaid named Sinjike (Korean: 신지끼) who warned fishermen of impending storms by singing and throwing rocks into the sea from Geomun Island. The island's residents believed her to be a goddess of the sea and that she could predict the weather.

=== Tale of Nangan ===
The Tale of Nangan is a mermaid legend handed down in Pyongyang, the capital of Goguryeo (currently Pyongyang). One day, a fisherman named Lee Jin-su went to the Dragon Palace and spent the day enjoying himself. Upon his departure, he received a mermaid, which was said to grant eternal youth and longevity if eaten. Suspicious of it, Lee hid it away without eating it, but his daughter Nangan ate it. She obtained rare and unchanging beauty, but was never blessed with marriage or children. At the age of 300, she climbed Moranbong and went missing. There is a theory that this Korean legend of Nangan was transmitted to Japan and became the origin of the Yao Bikuni folktale.

== Japanese folklore ==
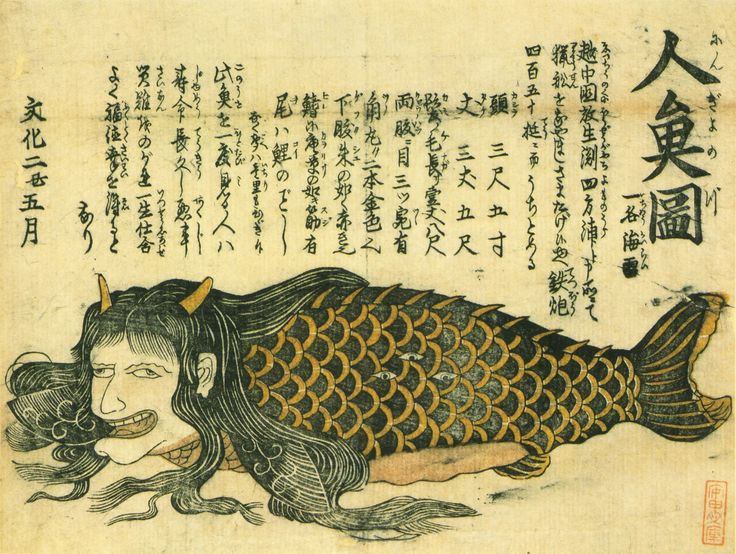
"Ningyo no zu": A flier of a mermaid, dated fifth month of Bunka 2 (1805).

The Japanese equivalent is ningyo (人魚; literally "human-fish"). According to one dictionary, ningyo oftentimes refers to a "half-woman and half-fish fabulous creature", i.e., mermaid, though the term ningyo is technically (though not customarily) inclusive of mermen. Despite being phrased as a "half-woman half-fish", the ningyo has typically been pictorialized as having a human female head on a fish-like body (see fig. right).

A famous ningyo legend concerns the Yao bikuni who is said to have partaken of the flesh of a merfolk and attained miraculous longevity and lived for centuries. It is not discernible whether the flesh was a female; a pair of translators call it "flesh of a mermaid" in one book, but merely a "strange fish with a human face" in another.

A ningyo might be counted as a yōkai since it is included in Toriyama Sekien's Hyakki Yagyō series. Gender is unclear, as it is only described as a being with "a human face, a fish body". However, Sekien's ningyo picture actually represents a "human-fish" that lives in Western China, also known as the Di people Diren, according to the inscription printed alongside. They are described in the Classic of Mountains and Seas and translated as the "Low People" or the "Di People".

== Indian, Southeast Asian, and Polynesian folklore ==
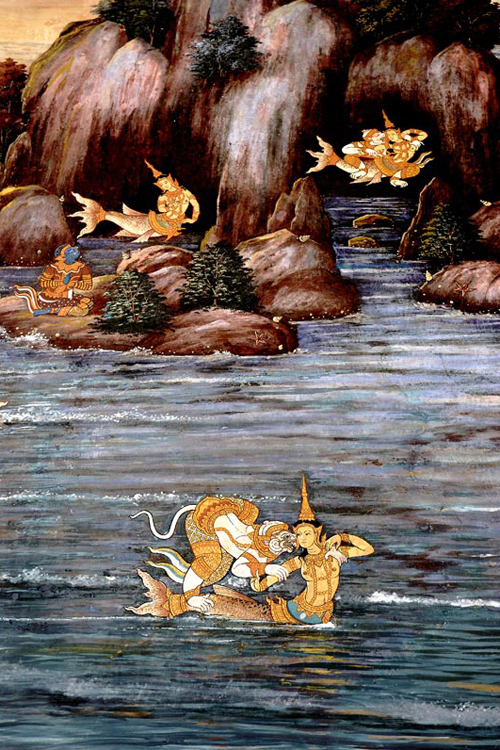
Suvannamaccha and Hanuman, mural at Wat Phra Kaew, Bangkok.

In Hinduism, Suvannamaccha (literally "golden mermaid") is a daughter of Ravana who also appears in the Thai and other Southeast Asian versions of Ramayana. She is a mermaid princess who tries to spoil Hanuman's plans to build a bridge to Lanka but falls in love with him instead.

In Cambodia, she is referred as Sovanna Maccha, a favorite for Cambodian audiences.

=== Indonesia ===
In the Javanese culture of Indonesia, Nyai Roro Kidul is a sea goddess and the Queen of the Southern Seas; the mermaid queen is said to inhabit the southern beach in Java. She has many forms; in her mermaid form, she is called Nyai Blorong.

=== Philippines ===
In the Tagalog language mermaids are known as sirena and siyokoy respectively. The general term for mermaid among all ethnic groups is Sirena.

In the Philippines, mermaid concepts differ per ethnic group. Among the Pangasinense, the Binalatongan mermaid is a Queen of the sea who married the mortal Maginoo Palasipas and ruled humanity for a time. Among the Ilocano, mermaids were said to have propagated and spread through the union of the first Serena and the first Litao, a water god. Among the Bicolano, mermaids were referred as Magindara, known for their beautiful voice and vicious nature.

In the folktale "Mermaid" (Cebuano language: Ang Kataw) localized in Cebu and Bohol Provinces, a couple named Juan and Juana is about to have a daughter, but the pregnant wife has a constant craving for milkfish (Cebuano: awa). One day his fishing caught nothing, but met a talking milkfish wearing a crown, the "King of the Fishes" (Cebuano: hari sa mga) who offered to give him plenty every day, in exchange for the taking the child later, at 7 years of age. She was eventually swept away by the waves, and presumed lost to the king. The parents, hoping to see her again on the beach did so finally, on a moonlit night, witnessed a black haired woman with the body of a milkfish, whom they knew was Maria. (Note: Alburo, Erlinda K. ed. tr., Reprinted in The Penguin Book of Mermaids.Bacchilega & Brown (2019), pp. 223–234)

=== New Zealand ===
Mermaids are characters in the myth of "Pania of the Reef", a well-known tale of Māori mythology.

== African folklore ==
Mami Water (Lit. "Mother of the Water") are water spirits venerated in West, Central and southern Africa, and in the African diaspora in the Caribbean and parts of North, Central and South America. They are usually female, but are sometimes male. They are regarded as diabolical beings, and are often femme fatales, luring men to their deaths. The Persian word "پری دریایی" or "maneli" means "mermaid".

Among the Shona of Zimbabwe, njuzu are mermaid-like spirits. The jengu, also known as the "Itongo" (Sea Queen), of Cameroon is sometimes depicted as half woman and half fish.

=== The Man Who Caught a Mermaid ===
A folktale from Madagascar. The story described below was collected by Natsuki Kawasaki as a tale handed down in Antsohihy, Sofia Region, Mahajanga Province.

One day, a poor fisherman named Butu caught a beautiful mermaid in a river. The mermaid told him that she knew Butu wanted a wife, and that was why she had entered his net. The mermaid transformed into a human form and became Butu's wife on the condition that he keep her true identity a secret. The mermaid possessed mysterious powers, and Butu's life became comfortable. However, one day, under the influence of alcohol, Butu revealed his wife's true identity. The wife used her mysterious powers to return Butu's house to its former shabby state and returned to the river. The next morning, when Butu sobered up, it was already too late, no matter how much he regretted it.

== Arabian folklore ==
=== One Thousand and One Nights ===
The One Thousand and One Nights collection includes several tales featuring "sea people", such as "Jullanâr the Sea-born and Her Son King Badr Bâsim of Persia". Unlike depictions of mermaids in other mythologies, these are anatomically identical to land-bound humans, differing only in their ability to breathe and live underwater. They can (and do) interbreed with land humans, and the children of such unions have the ability to live underwater. In the tale "Abdullah the Fisherman and Abdullah the Merman", the protagonist Abdullah the Fisherman gains the ability to breathe underwater and discovers an underwater society that is portrayed as an inverted reflection of society on land. The underwater society follows a form of primitive communism where concepts like money and clothing do not exist. In "The Adventures of Bulukiya", the protagonist Bulukiya's quest for the herb of immortality leads him to explore the seas, where he encounters societies of mermaids.

== Americas folklore ==
The Neo-Taíno nations of the Caribbean identify a mermaid called Aycayia with attributes of the goddess Jagua and the hibiscus flower of the majagua tree Hibiscus tiliaceus. In modern Caribbean culture, there are a number of mermaids that are derived from West African originals and transplanted by enslaved West Africans. These include Watramama in Suriname and Guyana, Mamadjo in Grenada, Yemanya or Yemaya in Brazil and Cuba, Erzulie in Haiti, and Lamanté in Martinique. There is a mermaid recognized as a Haitian vodou loa called Lasirèn (from the French French: la siréne, "the mermaid"), representing wealth, beauty and romance, but also the possibility of death.

=== Iara and Ipupiara ===
In Brazilian folklore, the iara, also known as mãe-d'agua ("lady/mother of the water") is a water-dwelling beauty whom fishermen are prone to fall prey to. According to eighteenth-century sources, she is a long-haired woman who enchant men by night, and those who succumb die, "drowned by passion". Folklore also blamed disappearances of men on the Iara who lured them singing in the indigenous language.

The ascribed hair and eye color differs depending on the tradition in various regions. According to the tale of the Manaus tribe, she has hair of the color of the pau d'arco tree's flowers (Note: yellow or white to pink, it is not clear.) (var. green hair) and pink skin, (Note: hair of "pau d'arco" color and skin as pink as colhereira occurs in Affonso Arinos (1917) "A Yara", "pink skin and green hair" in the variant of the same tale in Dorson, Mercedes; Wilmot, Jeanne edd. (1997) "The Legend of the Yara" Tales from the Rain Forest.) while she is black-haired according to some. Other commentators insist Iara is a "beautiful white woman who lives in a river", reputedly golden-haired, and blue-eyed though the blond, blue-eyed image was not attested until after the mid-nineteenth century, to the best knowledge of Camara Cascudo. (Note: The authority in question, Cascudo sees the influence of Gonçalves Dias's "romantic indigenization".) Cascudo in his earlier writing contended that though the Iara was rooted in two indigenous beings, the water-devil Ipupiara (cf. below) and the Cobra-Grande, he also saw the combining of the Portuguese lore of the Enchanted Moura (moorish girl), who was dark-skinned. (Note: Cascudo's Dicionario do folclore brasileiro (1954) explores numerous other contributing European lore and indigenous water-myth.) The Iara became increasingly regarded as a woman-fish, after the image of the European sirens/mermaids.

It is often argued that the legends of the Iara developed around the eighteenth century out of the indigenous myth of the Ipupiara among the Tupinambá people. The Ipupiara was originally conceived of as a male water-dweller that carried fishermen to the bottom, devouring their mouths, nose, fingertips and genitals. European writers during the age of exploration disseminated the myth, but the Gandavo (1576) (Note: Pero de Magalhães Gandavo. História da Província de Santa Cruz (1576)) included an illustration of "Hipupiàra" with female breasts. Subsequently the Jesuit Cardim (Note: Do clima e terra do Brasil, 1584) wrote that the "Igpupiàra" also consisted of females that look like women with long hair. Though somewhat vague in the case of Gandavo, Cardim had injected Christian opinion of relegating the role of emasculating men to the female kind. (Note: Fonseca invoking the vagina dentata concept and quoting Walker, Barbara G., ed. (1983). The Woman's Dictionary of Symbols and Sacred Objects. Harper & Row. p. 328. "Christianity made the vagina a metaphor for the gate of hell and revived the ancient fear-inducing image of the vagina dentata (toothed vagina) that could bite off a man's penis") Later with the introduction of African slaves, the Yoruba myth of Iemanjá was admixed into the telling.

=== Alamoa ===
The Alamoa is a well known legend in the island of Fernando de Noronha, northeast of the Brazilian mainland. An alluring half-naked woman, she would entice men to follow her. The charmed lovers would follow her into the night until they plunged off one of the archipelago's cliffs. Again, modern commentary paints her as a "beautiful white woman (linda mulher branca)", which would be consistent with the name Alamoa being an older form of alemão, which now means "blonde, fair-skinned woman" (Note: alemão in the first instance means "German woman", but by transference, became a "fair blonde".) (Note: One source considers Alamoa to be a corruption of the now standard alemão, but others explain Alamao to be the more antiquated form.) whereas older literature describes her as fulvous or tawny (fulva), though dressed in white, as according to Francisco Augusto Pereira da Costa (d. 1923). (Note: Costa Foclore (1908) apud Proença) (Note: Legend in verse, titled:"A Alamôa", narratated by a mother: "Não saias, meu filho.. Que podes topar, de noite a «Alamóa» /E' fulva donzella,―é a fada da ilha;... De noute passeia, vestida de branco") According to one telling, on Friday nights, the rock of Pico splits and emits a light beam, followed by Alamoa's appearance, attracting men; but she will then transform into skull and skeleton, (Note: The skull imprisons her victim according to modern commentary.) resulting in disappearances, except cries of terror can be occasionally heard. (Note: Story according to the story Olavo Dantas.) The Alamoa evidently maintains an underwater palace as well. These elements (skull, light, palace) are lacking in European (Dutch) lore, though general similarity to Holland's mermaid has been suggested.

== Reported sightings ==
=== Roman Lusitania and Gaul ===
In his Natural History 9.4.9–11, Pliny the Elder, remarked that a triton (merman) was seen off the coast of Olisipo (present-day Lisbon, Portugal), and it bore the physical appearance in accordance with common notion of the triton, according to a deputation from Lisbon who reported it to Emperor Tiberus. One nereid was sighted earlier on the same (Lisbon) coast. Pliny remarks that contrary to popular notion, the true nereids are not smooth-skinned in their human-like portions, but covered with scales all over the body. (Note: Reads "the portion of the body that resembles the human figure is still rough all over with scales" ub Bisticj and Riley's translation. This is given as "bristling with hair", in Rackham's (Loeb Classical Library translation, but squama here is probably 'scales' and the emendation is given in Hansen's rendering.) Their mournful songs at death have also been heard by the coastal inhabitants. Also, multiple nereids had washed up on the shore according to the legatus/governor of Gaul, who informed the late Emperor Augustus about it in a letter. (Note: IV. 9 Tiberio principi nuntiavit Olisiponensium legatio ob id missa visum auditumque in quodam specu concha canentem Tritonem qua noscitur forma. et Nereidum falsa non est, squamis modo hispido corpore etiam qua humanam effigiem habent; namque haec in eodem spectata litore est, cuius morientis etiam cantum tristem accolae audivere longe; et divo Augusto legatus Galliae complures in litore apparere examines Nereidas scripsit. — Pliny, Historia Naturalis IX.iv.9 Translation: IV. Tritons, Nereid and aquatic monsters. 9 An embassy from Lisbon sent for the purpose reported to the Emperor Tiberius that a Triton had been seen and heard playing on a shell in a certain cave, and that he had the well-known shape. The description of the Nereids also is not incorrect, except that their body is bristling with hair [sic] even in the parts where they have human shape; for a Nereid has been seen on the same coast, whose mournful song moreover when dying has been heard a long way off by the coast-dwellers; also the Governor of Gaul wrote to the late lamented Augustus that a large number of dead Nereids were to be seen on the shore. — translated by Harris Rackham (1958)) (Note: Pliny follows with an account of a "sea-man" witnessed on the Gulf of Gades (Gulf of Cádiz).)

Sixteenth-century Swedish writer Olaus Magnus quotes the same passage from Pliny, and further notes that the nereid are said to utter "dismal moans (wailings) at the hour of her death", thus observing a connection to the legend of sea-nymphs and the sister Fates whose clashing cymbals and flute tunes could be heard on shore. Olaus in a later passage states that the nereids (tr. "mermaids") are known to "sing plaintively", in general. (Note: i.e., not qualifying they do so at the hour of death.)

It has been conjectured that these carcasses of nereids washed up on shore were "presumably seals". (Note: Cf. the conjecture in the index to the Loeb Classics Library translation that Pliny's homo marinus (merman) may refer to "African manatee (?)".)

=== Age of Exploration Americas and polar frontiers ===
In 1493, sailing off the coast of Hispaniola, Christopher Columbus spotted three mermaids (Spanish: sirenas) which he said were not as beautiful as they are represented due to masculine features in their faces. He is widely believed to have seen manatees, not mermaids. During Henry Hudson's second voyage on 15 June 1608, members of his crew reported sighting a mermaid in the Arctic Ocean, either in the Norwegian or Barents Seas. Dutch explorer David Danell during his expeditions to Greenland in 1652–54 claimed to have spotted a mermaid with "flowing hair and very beautiful", though the crew failed to capture it.

==== Colonial Brazil ====
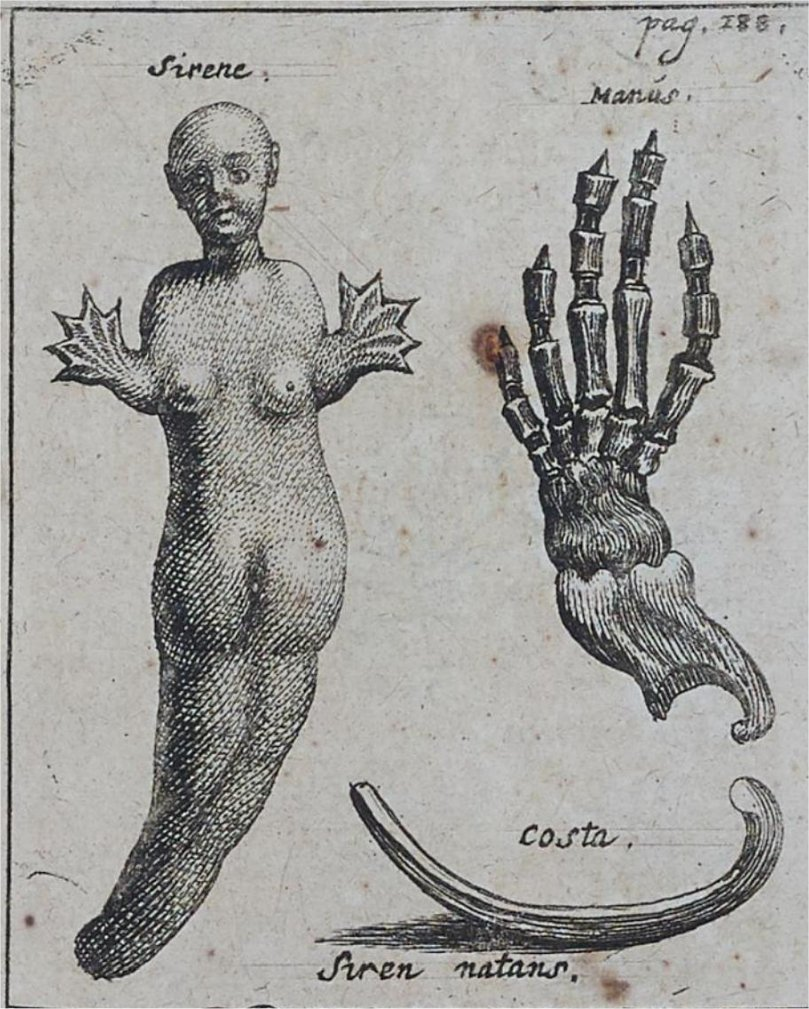
Bartholin's siren (1654). The bones of the "hand" in the drawings on the right correspond to the flipper of a manatee.

Danish physician and natural historian Thomas Bartholin wrote about a mermaid specimen caught in Brazil (probably a manatee) and subsequently dissected at Leiden. (Note: Bartholin: "prope Brasiliam.. captus suit homo marinus..", but Webster: "a Sea-Man taken by the Merchants of the West-India Company..", the latter omits mention of Brazil.) Though referred to in the text as a "sea-man" (homo marinus) from Brazil, the account was accompanied by an engraved drawing captioned "Sirene", whose appearance was that of a humanoid female with bared breasts (a mermaid). The specimen's body was deformed and "without the sign of a tail", matching the drawing. And "a membrane [that] join [the fingers] together" is also reflected in the drawing as well (as her webbed pair of hands/forepaws). (Note: Bartholin subsequently provides a textual description of a neckless siren with lactating breasts, however, that is the description from an entirely different specimen caught in the River Cuama off the Cape of Good Hope, quoted from Bernardinus Ginnarus.)

The specimen's account and illustration was later reproduced by Linnaeus, who captioned the beast "Siren Bartholini". Bartholin was actually not the sole proprietor of the specimen, but he came into possession of its hand and ribs, which he illustrated in his book. (Note: Bartholin describes in detail that it was caught off of Brazil by merchants of the (Dutch) West India Company, the GWC, and the dissection conducted in Leiden by Petrus Pavius (Pieter Pauw), attended by Johannes de Laet (who was director of the GWC); Bartholin was given a hand and few ribs from de Laet, as a token of friendship.) Based on the illustration, the "hand" has been determined to be the front flipper belonging to a manatee by a team of researchers. Bartholin himself had argued that it was a sea mammal closely related to seals (phocae). (Note: Bartholin writes Phocae, which is the genus, but perhaps he intended pinnipeds more broadly.) His rationale was that since there are several marine counterparts to land mammals e.g. "sea-horses", (Note: A "sea-horse" in reality was either walrus or sea-unicorns/narwhals, both sources for marine ivory. For water-horse as sea-unicorn, see Francisci (1668), opposite p. 1406, Plate XLVII.) the possibility of a marine creature with striking likeness to humans could not be ruled out, though they should all be classified among seal-kind. Erasmus Francisci (Erasmus Finx, 1668) associated this Brazilian specimen with the local native lore of the "Yupiapra" (Ipupiara. cf. § Iara and Ipupiara, supra.).

=== Dutch Formosa ===
According to Frederick Coyett, the last Dutch governor of Formosa (aka Taiwan), many people saw mermaids appearing in the waters near the Fort Zeelandia during Koxinga's 17th-century attack on the Dutch. The Dutch came to the waterways to search carefully, but they were gone. It was regarded as a sign of imminent disaster.

=== Colonial Southeast Asia ===
==== Seventeenth-century Visayas ====
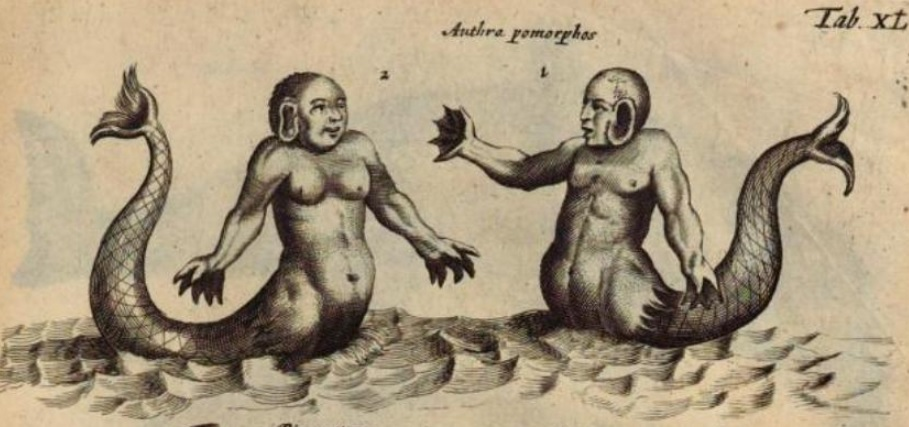
Anthropomorphos ―Johannes Jonston Historia naturalis in Latin, 1657

A type of mermaid referred to as "anthropomorphus" or "woman-fish" (Spanish: peche mujer) allegedly inhabited the Spanish-ruled Philippines, particularly in the waters around the Visayan Islands, according to contemporary writings from the seventeenth century. (Note: The incidents of capture and localities are as follows (the actual sources/authors will be elaborated in the citation footnotes to follow.): In Kircher and Jonston's writings, the place of capture is given as the Insulas Pictorum near the Visayas, namely, the "Island[s] of the Artist[s]". A group of islands within the Visayas (including e.g. (Mindoro) was known as the Islas de los Pintados ('Islands of the Painted People'). Therefore referring to the locality as somewher within the present-day Visayas The Dutch translation rendered the islands, not as "the Islands of the Painted/Painters", but as "the Picten Islands", in turn understood to mean "the Islands of the Picts".; Colin identified the habitat as the Philippine waters and Malacca (Strait of Malacca).; Nvarette while visiting Mindro (aforementioned island), writes of the abundance of fish and the presence of "woman-fish" under the heading o NanboanNanboan (namely Nauján).).)

The accounts are found in several books, on various topics from magnetism, to natural history, to ecclesiastical history. (Note: Athanasius Kircher Magnes sive De arte magnetica (1641), whose account is reiterated in Johannes Jonston Historiae naturalis de piscibus et cetis libri 5 (in Latin, 1657; Dutch translation Beschryvingh van de Natuur der Vissen en bloedloze Water-dieren, 1660). Also Francisco Colín (1663) Labor evangelica, Domingo Fernández Navarrete Tratados historicos, politicos, ethicos, y religiosos de la monarchia de China (1676).)

These books refer to the mermaid/merman as "piscis anthropomorphos" (Dutch: Anthropomorphus), (Note: Kircher's Latin text actually resorts to writing out "piscis ανθρωπόμορφος" partly in Greek (Greek ligature is used for the final omicron-sigma). Jonston's Latin version uses "anthropomorphos"; the Dutch translator changed this to "-morphus" in the text, though the caption remained "-phos" in the engraving.) and emphasize how human-like they appear in their upper bodies, as well as providing woodcut or etchings illustrating the male and female of the part-human part-fish creature.

The "woman-fish" (or peche mujer in modern Spanish) (Note: In the primary sources, variously spelt in Middle Spanish as peche muger, pez muller, pexe muller, etc.)) was the name given to the creature among the Spaniards, but the sources also state it was called "duyon" by the indigenous people. (Note: The word is "duyong" in the Ilongo (Hiligaynon) or Palawano language of the Bisayans.) and it is assumed the actual creature was a dugong (according to modern translators' notes). (Note: According to Navarrete, an indigenous man had confessed to having nightly sexual intercourse with a piscis mulier or pexemulier "said to resemble a woman from the breasts down" .)

Several of these sources mention the medical use of the woman-fish to control the flow of blood (or the four humours). It was effective for staunching the bleeding, i.e., effective against hemorrhages, according to Jonston. (Note: Appropriating "remedy for hemorrhages" which is Castiglioni's paraphrase of Ōtsuki Gentaku writing shiketsu (止血/血を止む; 'stop the bleeding') in his Japanese translation of Johnston.) Other sources mention the ability to stop bleeding, e.g. Colín, who also thought that the Philippine woman-fish tasted like fatty pork. (Note: Colín, on the "Pez Muller" (marginalia) or "Pexe Muller/Duyon" (text): "me pareciò su carne como de torcino gordo") The bones were made into beads (i.e., strung together), as it was believed effective against defluxions (of the humours). (Note: Navarrete, Cummins tr.: "singular virtue against Defluxions".)

==== Eighteenth-century Moluccas ====
Renard's illustrated book of marine life

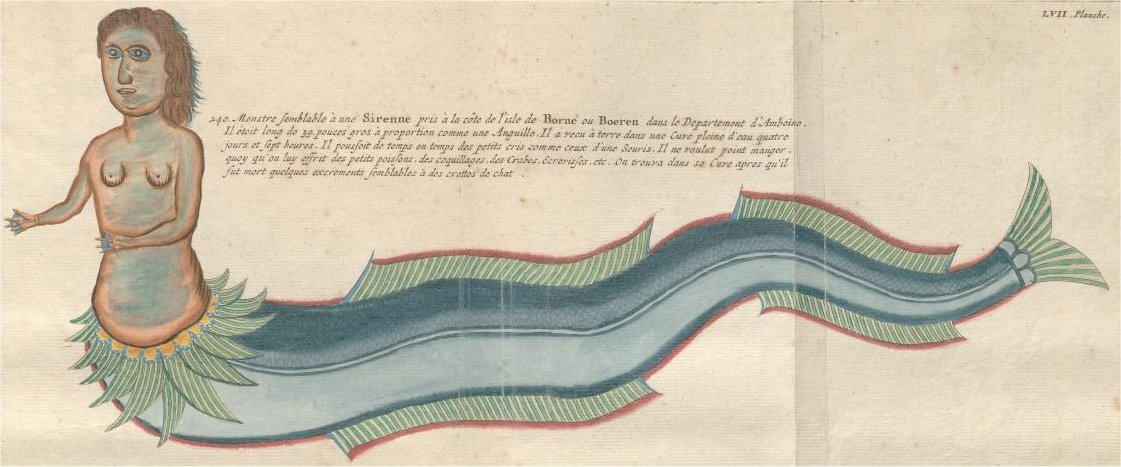
"Monster or Siren (mermaid)"
―Louis Renard Poissons, ecrevisses et crabes.. autour des isles Moluques et sur les côtes des terres Australes, 2nd edition, 1754

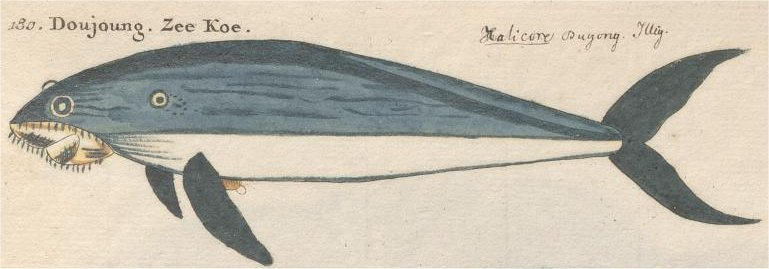
A dugong (ditto book)

Allegedly captured in the Moluccas in the seventeenth century was the so-called "Amboina mermaid" (after the then Dutch Province of Ambon), (Note: Later it was no longer a Dutch Province. Bassett (1892) renamed her the "Molucca siren", but that name does not seem to have wide circulation.) which its leading researcher has referred to as Samuel Fallours's "Sirenne", after the man who came into possession of it and made an original painting of it in full color.

The painting was reproduced by Louis Renard on the "Fish" of the region, first published in 1719, (Note: Louis Renard(1678/79–1746).Poissons, ecrevisses et crabes, de diverses couleurs et figures extraordinaires: que l'on trouve autour des isles Moluques et sur les côtes des terres Australes ('Fish, [Lobsters], Crabs, in Various Colors and Extraordinary Shapes, as Found in the Moluccas and on the Coasts of Australia', first edition 1719, second edition 1754. (Note: color illustrations engraved copper plates, hand-painted in color.) of various marine organisms of the Moluccas region, including this mermaid.)

It was supposedly caught by Boeren in Ambon Province (Buru, in present-day Maluku Province), presumably around the years 1706–1712, (Note: Hayward (2018), pp. 93–94, citing Pietsch (1991)) or perhaps the year 1712 precisely. (Note: According to Valentijn/Valentyn (1726), Oud en Nieuw Oost-Indiën, 3, Part 1, pp. 331–332 quoted in English translation in Pietsch (1991), p. 7.) During this period, Fallours served briefly as soldier for the VOC (Dutch East India Company) starting June 1706, but turned associate curate (Krankbezoeker) for the Dutch Reformed Church (September 1706 to June 1712).

Fallour's mermaid with additional details were described by François Valentijn in a 1726 book. (Note: François Valentyn, Oud en Nieuw Oost-Indiën, vol. 3.) (Note: Valentijn was also a minister of the church, mostly in the employ of the VOC; he was minister in Ambon at age 19 from 1685 for a decade, and was stationed again in Java 1705–1714. but was minister in Dorchrecht, Netherlands by 1916 when Renard corresponded with him seeking help for his book, and he compiled his own book while in the Netherlands.)

The mermaid was 59 Dutch inches (duimen) long, or 5 feet in Rhineland measures. She reportedly survived 4 days 7 hours in a water tank, and died after refusing food it was given, having uttered no intelligible sound, or issuing sounds like screechings of a mouse. Something like a straw cape (Japanese mino) appears wrapped around her waist in the painting according to one commentator, but Fallours revealed in his notes that he lifted the front and back fins and "[found] it was shaped like a woman".

The mermaid was suspected to be a dugong in reality, even by contemporary scholars such as Georg Rumphius, although Valentijn was unable to believe they were the one and the same. Leading researcher Theodore W. Pietsch (Note: And editor of the English edition of Renard's work.) concurs with the dugong identification, but an ichthyologist has opined that "I could more easily accept a small oar-fish, or another eel-like fish, rather than a dugong as a partial basis for the drawing", noting that Renard's book carries an illustration of a plausibly realistic dugong as well.

=== Qing dynasty China ===
The Yuezhong jianwen (Chinese: 粵中見聞; Wade–Giles: Yueh-chung-chieh-wen; "Seens and Heards", or "Jottings on the South of China", 1730) contains two accounts concerning mermaids. In the first, a man captures a mermaid (海女 "sea woman") on the shore of Lantau Island (Wade–Giles: Taiyü-shan). She looks human in every respect except that her body is covered with fine hair of many colors. She cannot talk, but he takes her home and marries her. After his death, the mermaid returns to the sea where she was found. In the second story, a man sees a woman lying on the beach while his ship was anchored offshore. On closer inspection, her feet and hands appear to be webbed. She is carried to the water, and expresses her gratitude toward the sailors before swimming away.

=== U.S. and Canada ===
Two sightings were reported in Canada near Vancouver and Victoria, one from sometime between 1870 and 1890, the other from 1967. A Pennsylvania fisherman reported five sightings of a mermaid in the Susquehanna River near Marietta in June 1881.

=== Twenty-first century ===
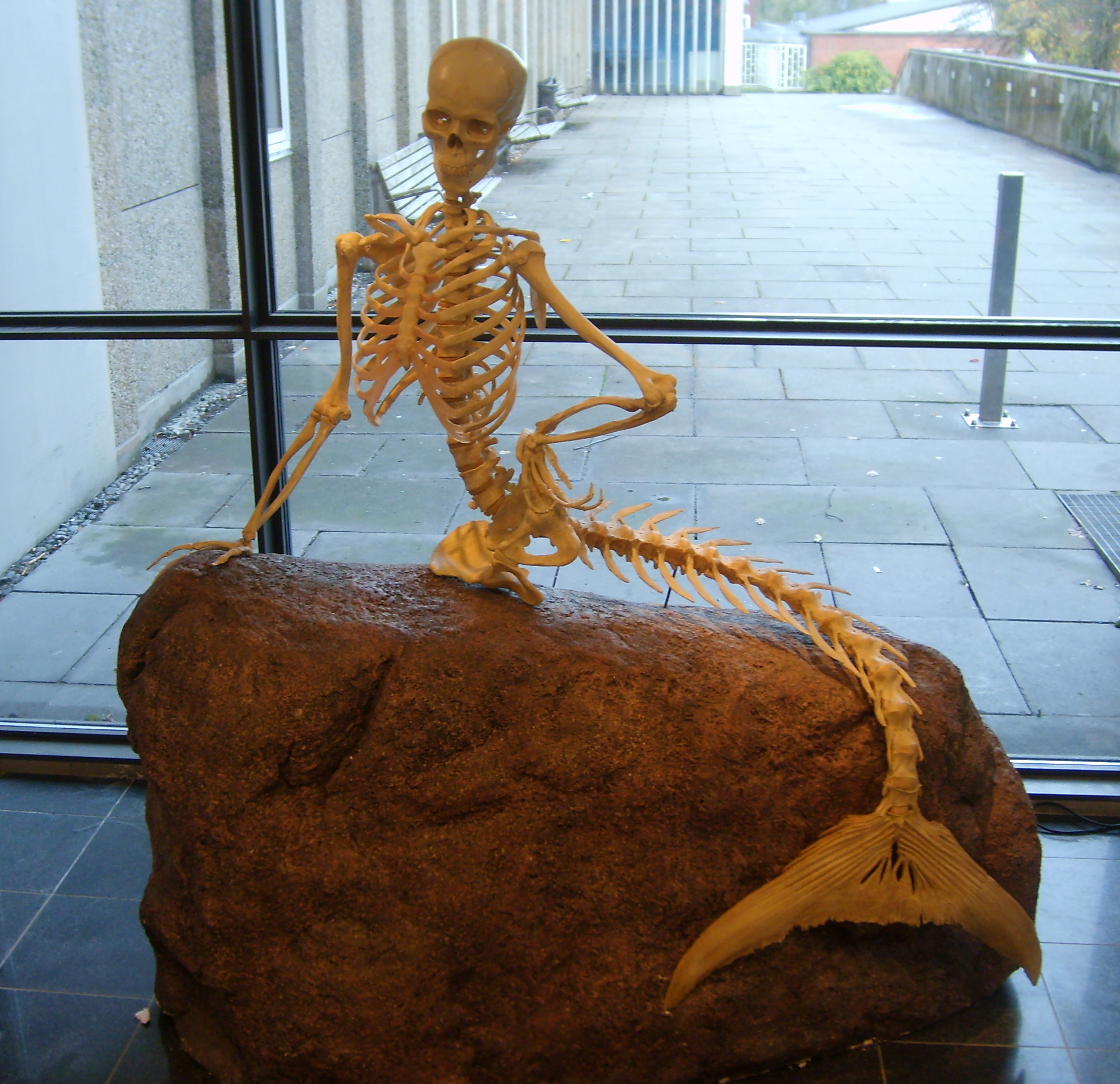
Reconstructed mermaid skeleton in Zoologisk Museum

In August 2009, after dozens of people reported seeing a mermaid leaping out of Haifa Bay waters and doing aerial tricks, the Israeli coastal town of Kiryat Yam offered a $1 million award for proof of its existence.

In February 2012, work on two reservoirs near Gokwe and Mutare in Zimbabwe stopped when workers refused to continue, stating that mermaids had hounded them away from the sites. It was reported by Samuel Sipepa Nkomo, the water resources minister.

== Hoaxes and show exhibitions ==
=== Manufactured merfolk specimens ===
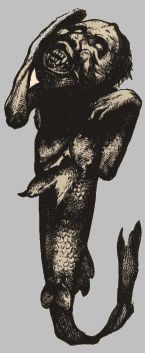
P.T. Barnum's Fiji mermaid (1842)

A celebrated example of mermaid hoax was the Fiji mermaid exhibited in London in 1822 (Note: This specimen had been on display inside a jar at the Turf Coffee-house, St. James's Street as illustrated in an etching of it was made by artist George Cruikshank.) and later in America by P. T. Barnum in 1842; (Note: Although the exhibitors called it "mermaid", the gender (as to the monkey port or fish part used) is probably unclear, and one newspaper renames it "Barnum's merman".) in this case an investigator claims to have traced the mermaid's manufacture to a Japanese fisherman.

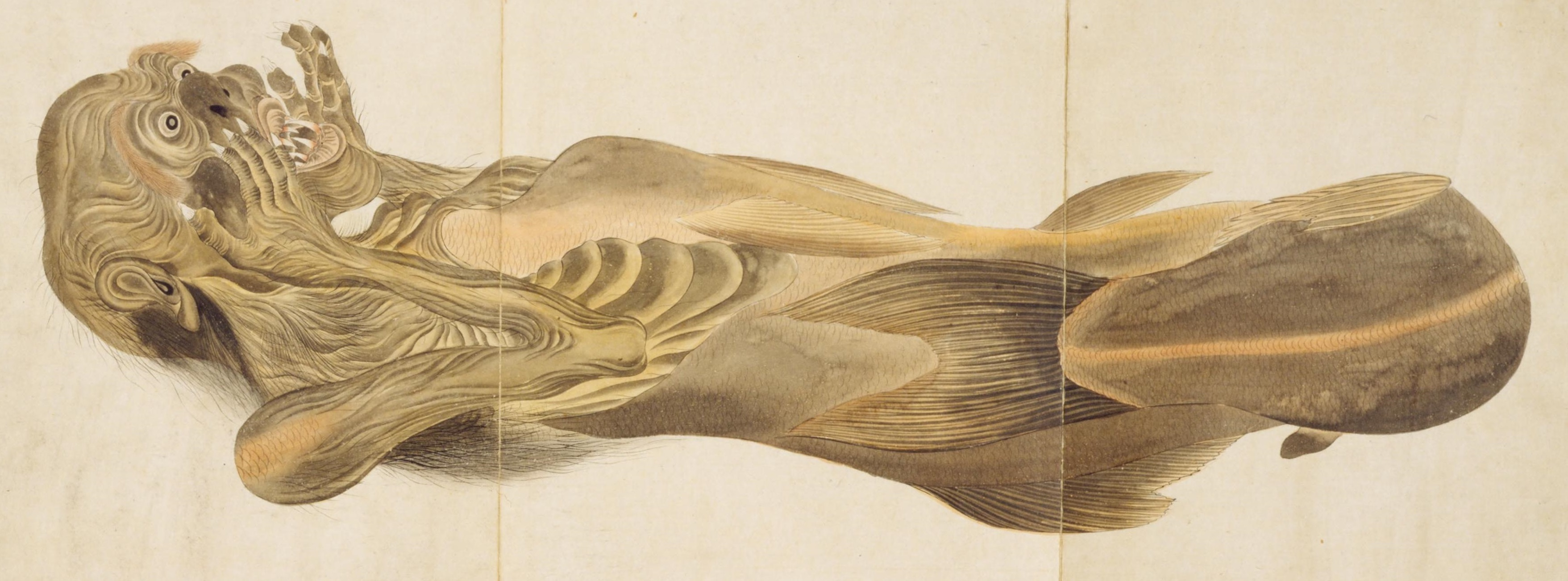
An alleged ningyo or merman/mermaid specimen (side view) ―Baien's sketch (1825)

Fake mermaids made in China and the Malay Archipelago out of monkey and fish parts were imported into Europe by Dutch traders since the mid-sixteenth century, and their manufactures are thought to go back earlier, according to ichthyologist E. W. Gudger. The manufacture of mermaids from monkey and fish parts also occurred in Japan, especially in the Kyūshū region, as a souvenir industry targeting foreigners. (Note: Marine biologist Hondo comments that the Japanese souvenirs tended to use a group of fish shaped like the suzuki (Japanese sea bass), and asserts that in Canton, China, the type of fish used were Cyprinids (carp family), Nibea mitsukurii, and the giant mottled eel. The mermaid drawn by Cruikshank (i.e., the Fiji mermaid) is speculated to be "concocted from a blue-faced monkey and a salmon".) Japanese naturalist Mōri Baien painted full color illustrations of such a compositely manufactured ningyo specimen in his ichthyological tract (1825). For much of the Edo Period, Nagasaki (in Kyūshū) was the only trade port open to foreign countries, and the only place where non-Japanese aliens could reside. Jan Cock Blomhoff, the Dutch East India Company director stationed in Dejima (the artificial island outpost off Nagasaki) is known to have acquired merfolk mummies; these and other specimens are now held in the National Museum of Ethnology in Leiden, Netherlands.

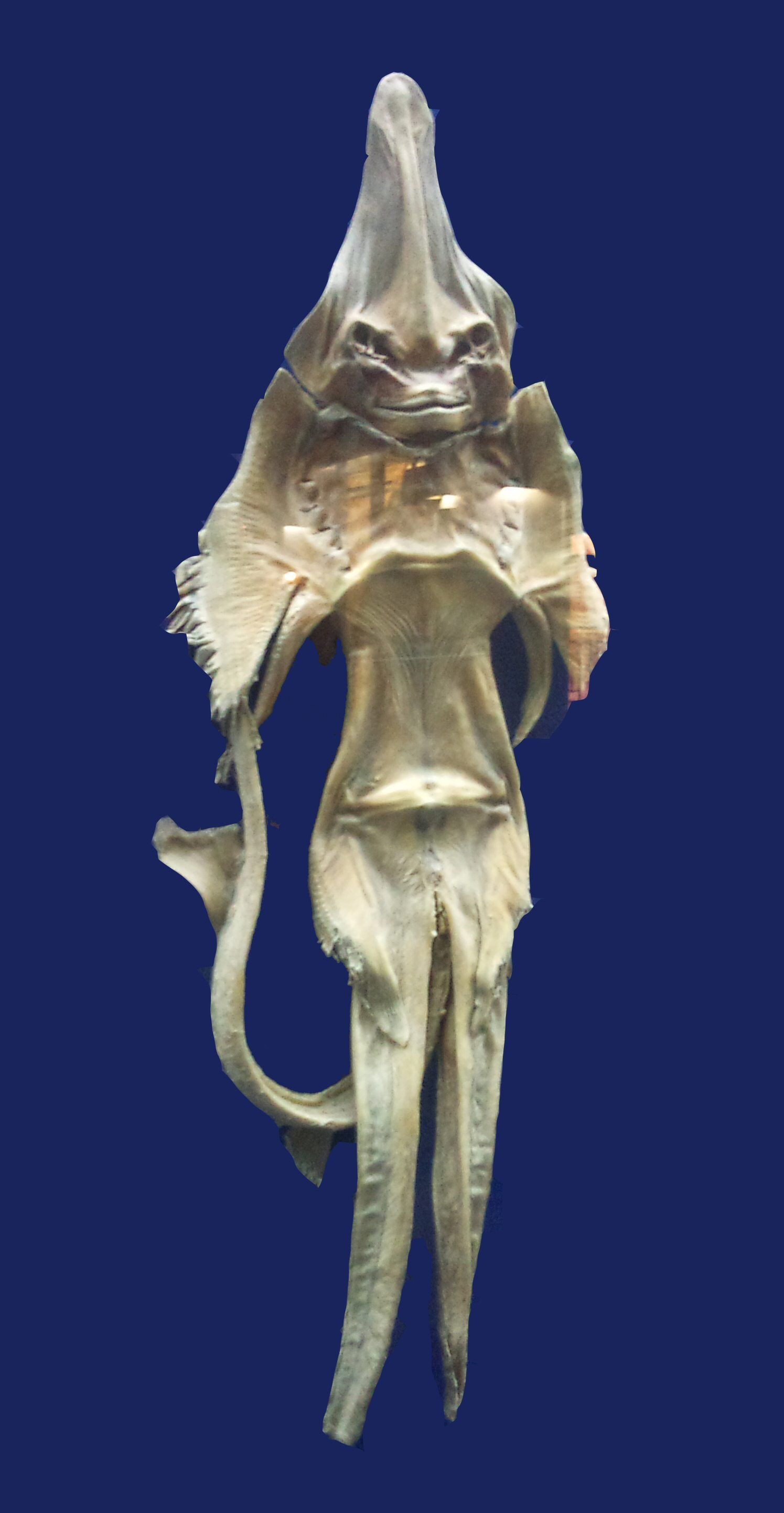
A mummified "Sea Devil" (Persian: شیطان دریا) fish, Mashhad Museum, Iran.

The equivalent industry in Europe was the Jenny Haniver made from dried rays.

In the middle of the seventeenth century, John Tradescant the elder created a wunderkammer (called Tradescant's Ark) in which he displayed, among other things, a "mermaid's hand".

=== Mermaid shows ===
Scantily clad women placed in watertanks and impersonating mermaids performed at the 1939 New York World's Fair. It was part of the "Dream of Venus" installation by Surrealist artist Salvador Dalí. The mermaid interacted with Oscar the Obscene Octopus, and the ongoings were portrayed in E. L. Doctorow's novel World's Fair.

Professional female divers have performed as mermaids at Florida's Weeki Wachee Springs since 1947. The state park calls itself "The Only City of Live Mermaids" and was extremely popular in the 1960s, drawing almost one million tourists per year. Most of the current performers work part-time while attending college, and all are certified Scuba divers. They wear fabric tails and perform aquatic ballet (while holding their breath) for an audience in an underwater stage with glass walls. Children often ask if the "mermaids" are real. The park's PR director says, "Just like with Santa Claus or any other mythical character, we always say yes. We're not going to tell them they're not real".

The Ama are Japanese skin divers, predominantly women, who traditionally dive for shellfish and seaweed wearing only a loincloth and who have been in action for at least 2,000 years. Starting in the twentieth century, they have increasingly been regarded as a tourist attraction. They operate off reefs near the shore, and some perform for sightseers instead of diving to collect a harvest. They have been romanticized as mermaids.

== Scientific inquiry ==
The topic of mermaids in earnest has arisen in several instances of scientific scrutiny, including a biological assessment of the unlikelihood of the supposed evolutionary biology of the mermaid on the popular marine science website DeepSeaNews. Five of the primary reasons listed as to why mermaids do not fit current evolutionary understanding are thermoregulation (adaptations for regulating body heat); evolutionary mismatch; reproductive challenges; digestive differences between mammals and fish; and lack of physical evidence. Mermaids were discussed tongue-in-cheek in a scientific article by University of Washington emeritus oceanographer Karl Banse, written as a parody.

== Arts, entertainment, and media ==
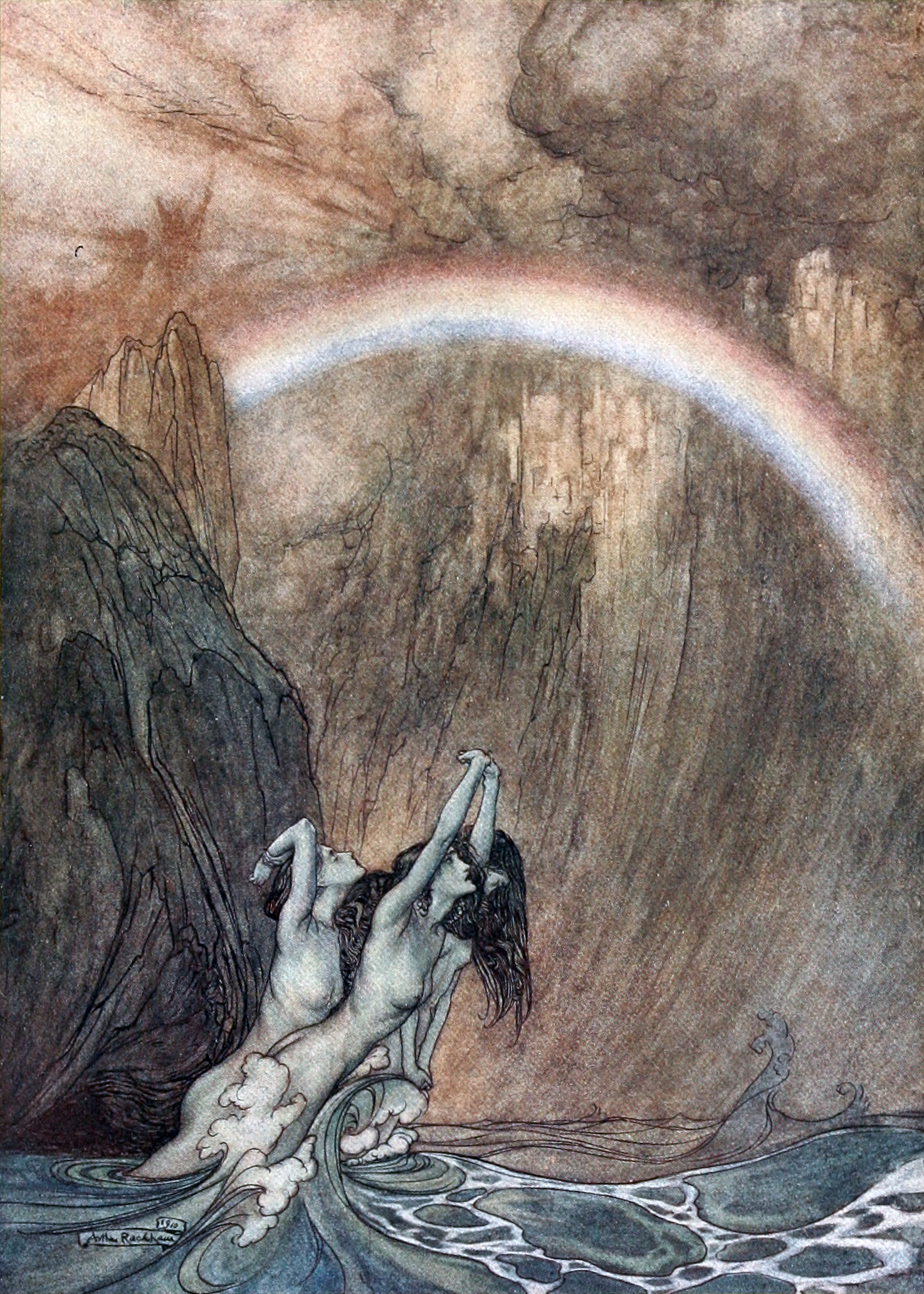
Arthur Rackham, Rhinemaidens, from The Rhinegold & The Valkyrie (1910).

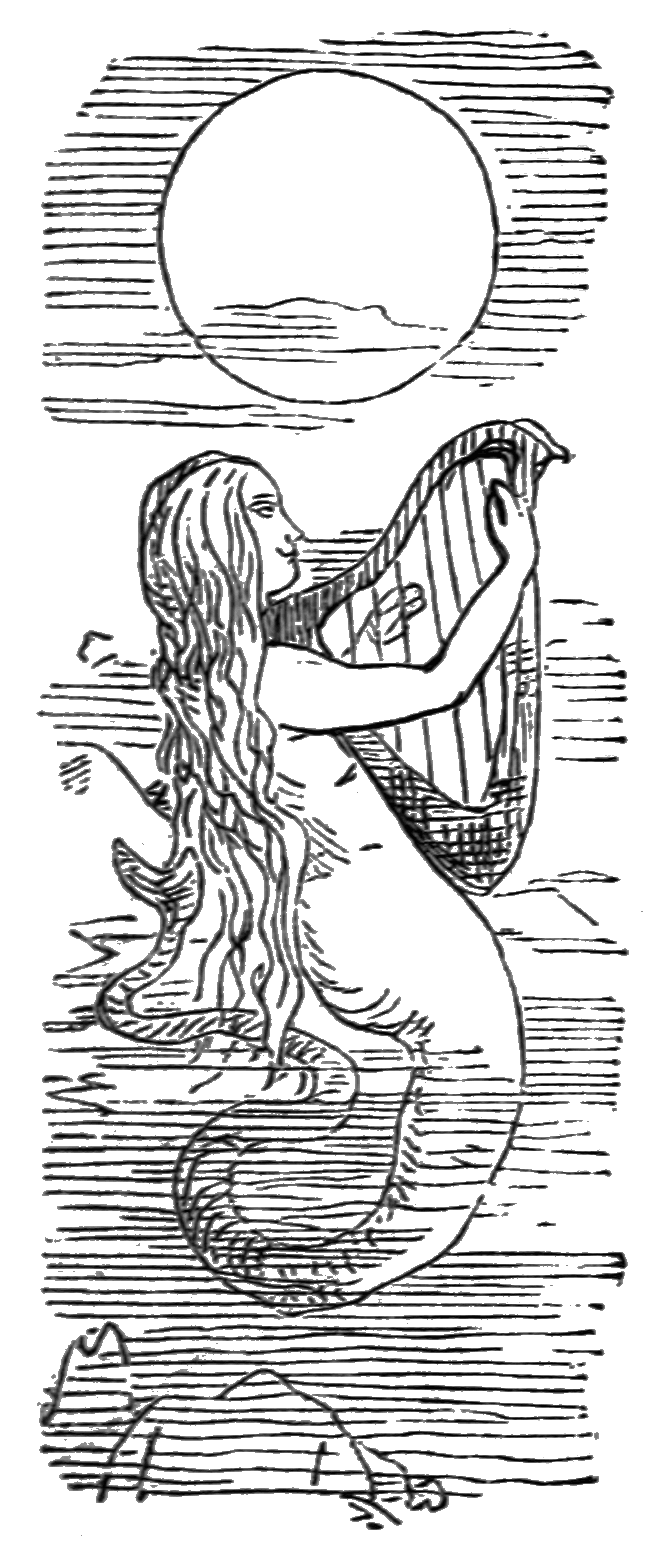
An illustration of Vanity Fair's Becky Sharp as a man-killing mermaid, by the work's author William Thackeray.

=== Literature ===
The best-known example of mermaids in literature is probably Hans Christian Andersen's fairy tale, "The Little Mermaid", first published in 1837. The title character, youngest of the Merman-king's daughters, falls in love with a human prince (Note: The prince remains unacquainted with her, despite being saved by her from a shipwreck. The mermaid had brought him ashore unconscious and then hid behind rocks and covered herself in foam to hide.) and also longs for an eternal soul like humans, despite the shorter lifespan. The two cravings are intertwined: only by achieving true love will her soul bind with a human's and become everlasting. But the mermaid's fish-tail poses an insurmountable obstacle for enticing humans, and a sea-witch offers a potion to transform into human form, at a price (the mermaid's tongue and beautiful voice). The mermaid endures the excruciating pain of having human legs, and despite her inability to speak, almost succeeds in wedding the prince, but for a twist of fate. (Note: The prince is betrothed to a princess, who turns out to be the girl he mistakenly believed to be his rescuer (due to the mermaid's concealment).) The mermaid is doomed unless she stabs the prince with a magic knife on his wedding night. She refuses to harm him and dies the mermaid way, dissolving into foam. However, her selflessness has earned her a second chance at salvation, and she is resurrected as an air spirit.

Andersen's works has been translated into over 100 languages. One of the main literary influences for Andersen's mermaid was Undine, an earlier German novella about a water nymph who could only obtain an immortal soul by marrying a human. Andersen's heroine inspired a bronze sculpture in Copenhagen harbour and influenced Western literary works such as Oscar Wilde's The Fisherman and His Soul and H. G. Wells' The Sea Lady.

=== Art and music ===
Sculptures and statues of mermaids can be found in many countries and cultures, with over 130 public art mermaid statues across the world. Countries with public art mermaid sculptures include Russia, Finland, Lithuania, Poland, Romania, Denmark, Norway, England, Scotland, Ireland, Germany, the Netherlands, Belgium, France, Spain, Italy, Austria, Switzerland, Greece, Turkey, India, China, Thailand, South Korea, Japan, Guam, Australia, New Zealand, Brazil, Ecuador, Colombia, Mexico, the Cayman Islands, Mexico, Saudi Arabia (Jeddah), the United States (including Hawaii and the U.S. Virgin Islands) and Canada.

An influential image was created by the Pre-Raphaelite painter John William Waterhouse, from 1895 to 1905, entitled A Mermaid (Cf. figure, top of page). An example of late British Academy-style artwork, the piece debuted to considerable acclaim (and secured Waterhouse's place as a member of the Royal Academy), but disappeared into a private collection and did not resurface until the 1970s. It is currently once again in the Royal Academy's collection. Waterhouse's mermaid grooms her hair with comb and mirror, the stereotypical implements of the mermaid, likely designed to portray her as temptress, and her red hair (auburn hair) is a match for the hair colour of Venus. (Note: And the comb and mirror were originally associated with Aphrodite/Venus, as Fraser points out here.) Waterhouses's The Siren (1900) also depicts the siren as a mermaid of sorts, representing the femme fatale drawing men to destruction. In the modern age of course, the word "siren" is used as a synonym of femme fatale.

Musical depictions of mermaids include those by Felix Mendelssohn in his Fair Melusina overture and the three "Rhine daughters" in Richard Wagner's opera Der Ring des Nibelungen. Lorelei, the name of a Rhine mermaid immortalized in the Heinrich Heine poem of that name, has become a synonym for a siren. The Weeping Mermaid is an orchestral piece by Taiwanese composer Fan-Long Ko.

=== Motion pictures ===
Film depictions include Miranda (1948), Night Tide (1961), the romantic comedy Splash (1984), and Aquamarine (2006). In She Creature (2001), two carnival workers abduct a mermaid in Ireland c. 1900 and attempt to transport her to America. The film Pirates of the Caribbean: On Stranger Tides makes many uses of the mermaid theme.

Disney's musical animated version of Andersen's tale, The Little Mermaid, was released in 1989. Notable changes to Andersen's story include removing the religious aspects of the fairy tale, including the mermaid's quest to obtain an immortal soul. The sea-witch herself replaces the princess to whom the prince becomes engaged, using the mermaid's voice to prevent her from obtaining the prince's love. However, on their wedding day the plot is revealed and the sea-witch is vanquished. The knife motif is not used in the film, which ends with the mermaid and the prince marrying.

=== Heraldry ===
Arms of Warsaw

In heraldry, the charge of a mermaid is commonly represented with a comb and a mirror, and blazoned as a "mermaid in her vanity". In addition to vanity, mermaids are also a symbol of eloquence.

Mermaids appear with greater frequency as heraldic devices than mermen do. A merman and a mermaid are depicted on the coat of arms of Schouwen-Duiveland. A mermaid appears on the arms of the University of Birmingham, in addition to those of several British families. A mermaid with two tails is called a melusine. Melusines appear in German heraldry, and less frequently in the British version. A shield and sword-wielding mermaid (Syrenka) is on the official coat of arms of Warsaw. Images of a mermaid have symbolized Warsaw on its arms since the middle of the fourteenth century. Several legends associate Triton of Greek mythology with the city, which may have been the origin of the mermaid's association.

The Cusack family crest includes a mermaid wielding a sword, as depicted on a memorial stone for Sir Thomas Cusack (1490–1571).

Mermaids appear on the coat of arms of Ustka, Białobrzegi and Białobrzegi County (Poland), Seeboden am Millstätter See (Austria), Bray (Ireland), Santa Colomba de Curueño, Ruente, Bertizarana, Villanueva de la Serena (Spain), Päijät-Häme (Finland), Åsgårdstrand (Norway), Royat, Xammes, Lancieux, Erquy, Chens-sur-Léman, Didenheim, Wimereux (France), Eemsmond, Makkum, Uithuizermeeden (Netherlands), Waasmunster (Belgium), and Westerdeichstrich (Germany). The city of Norfolk, Virginia also uses a mermaid as a symbol. The personal coat of arms of Michaëlle Jean, former Governor General of Canada, features two mermaids as supporters.

== Fandom ==
Interest in mermaid costuming has grown with the popularity of fantasy cosplay, as well as the availability of inexpensive monofins used in the construction of these costumes. The costumes are typically designed to be used while swimming, in an activity known as mermaiding. Mermaid fandom conventions have also been held.

== Gallery ==
=== Illustrations and paintings ===
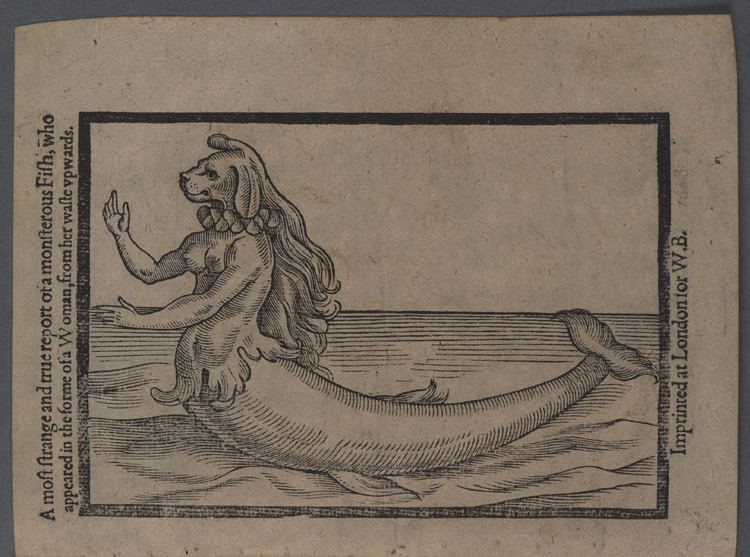
'A most strange and true report of a monstrous fish' Illustration from an early printed report of a Mermaid sighting, 1604

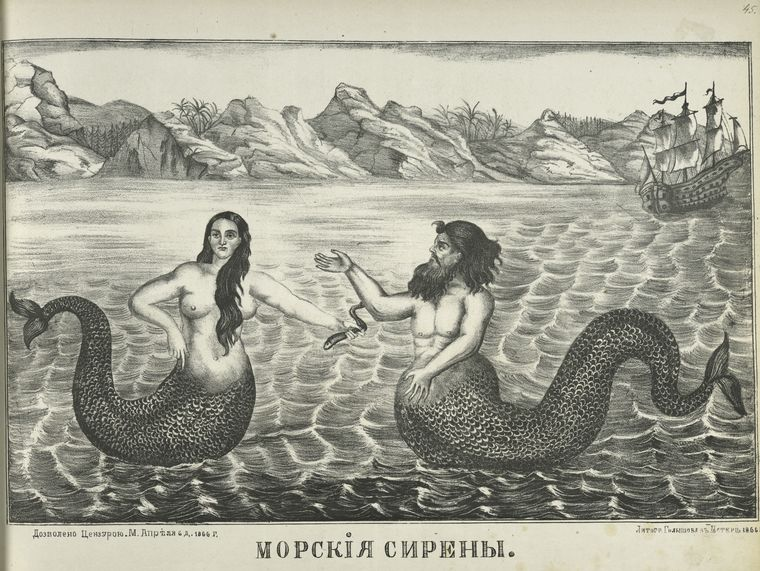
Mermaid and merman, 1866. Unknown Russian folk artist

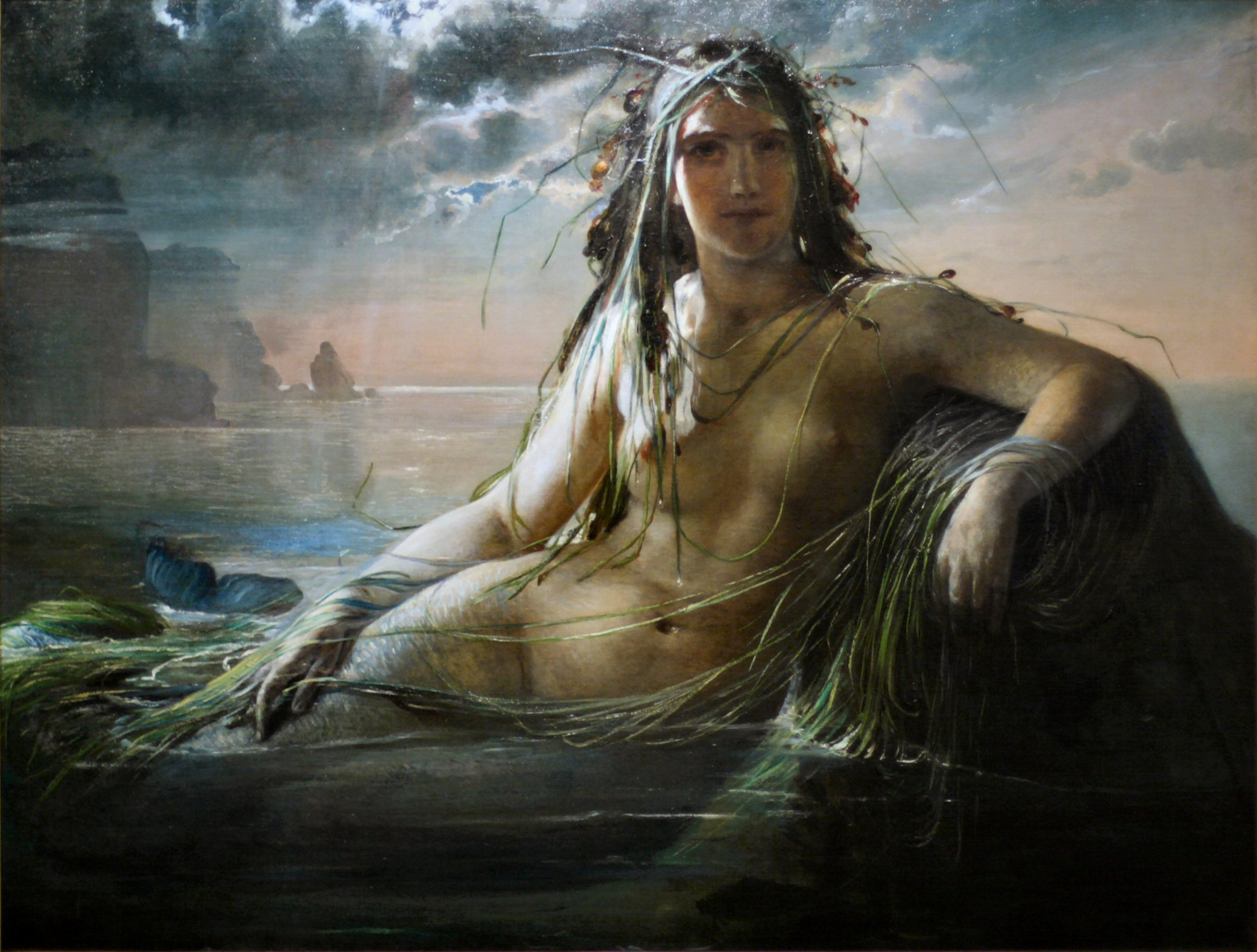
Havfrue, by Elisabeth Jerichau Baumann (1873)

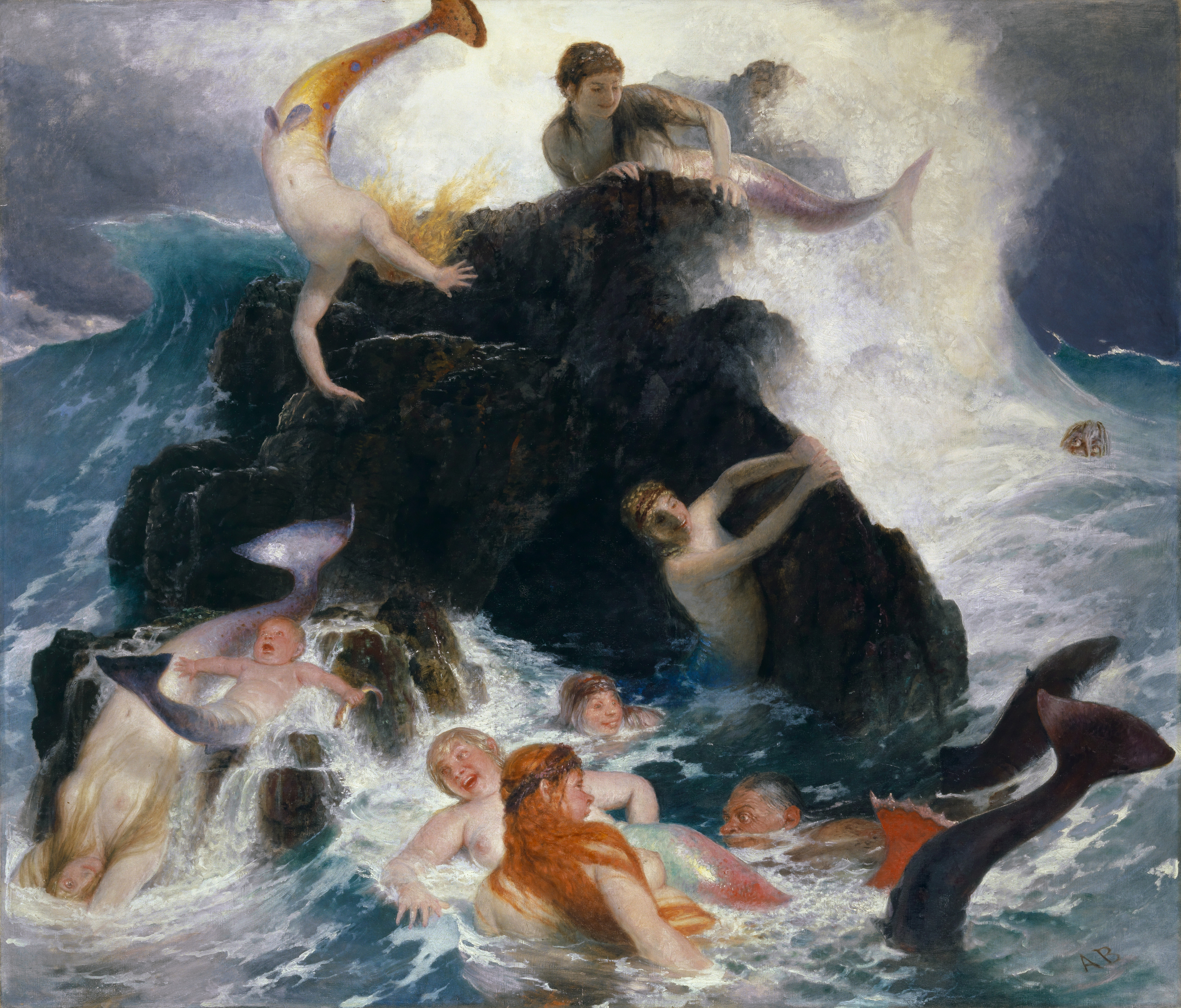
The Play of the Naiads, by Arnold Böcklin (1886)

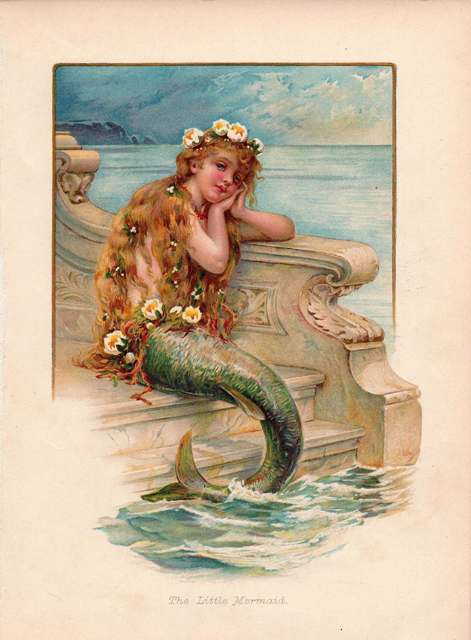
Illustration of The Little Mermaid by E. S. Hardy (c. 1890)

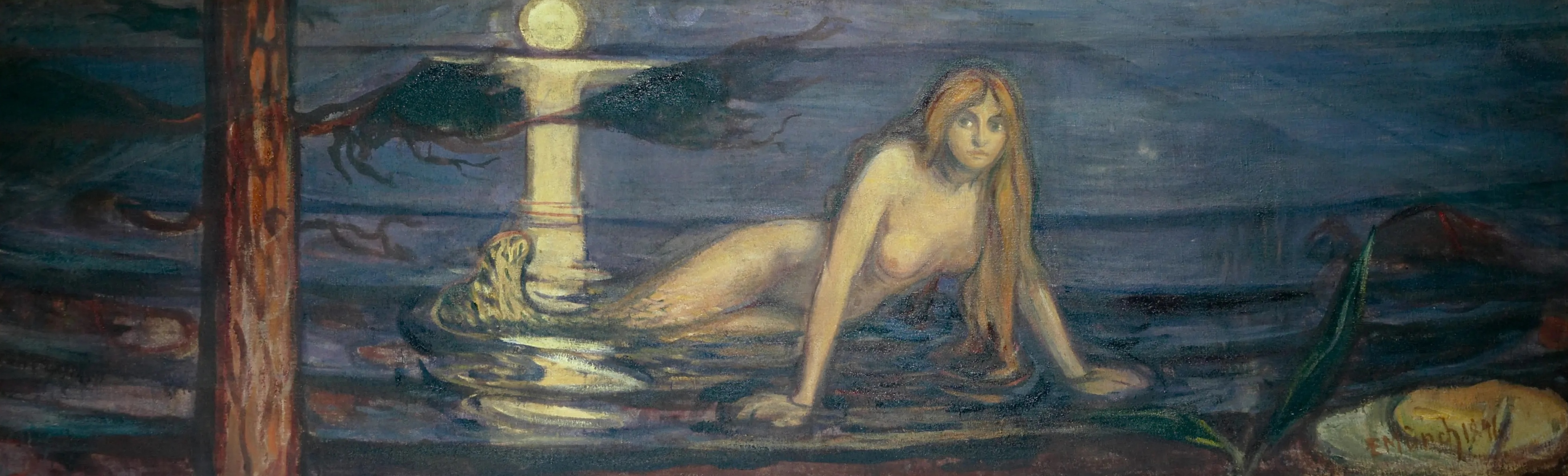
The Mermaid, by Edvard Munch (1896)

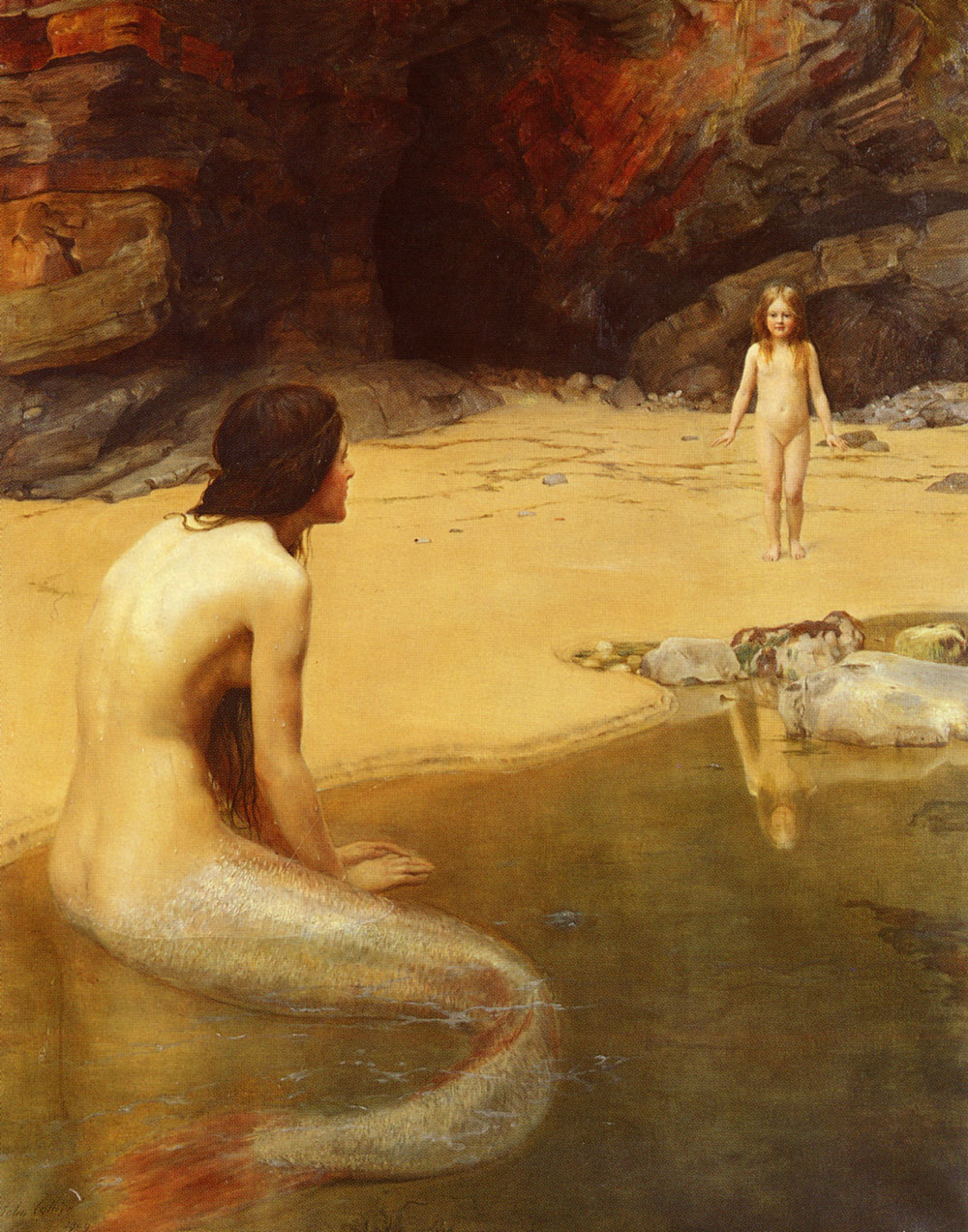
The Land Baby, by John Collier (1899)

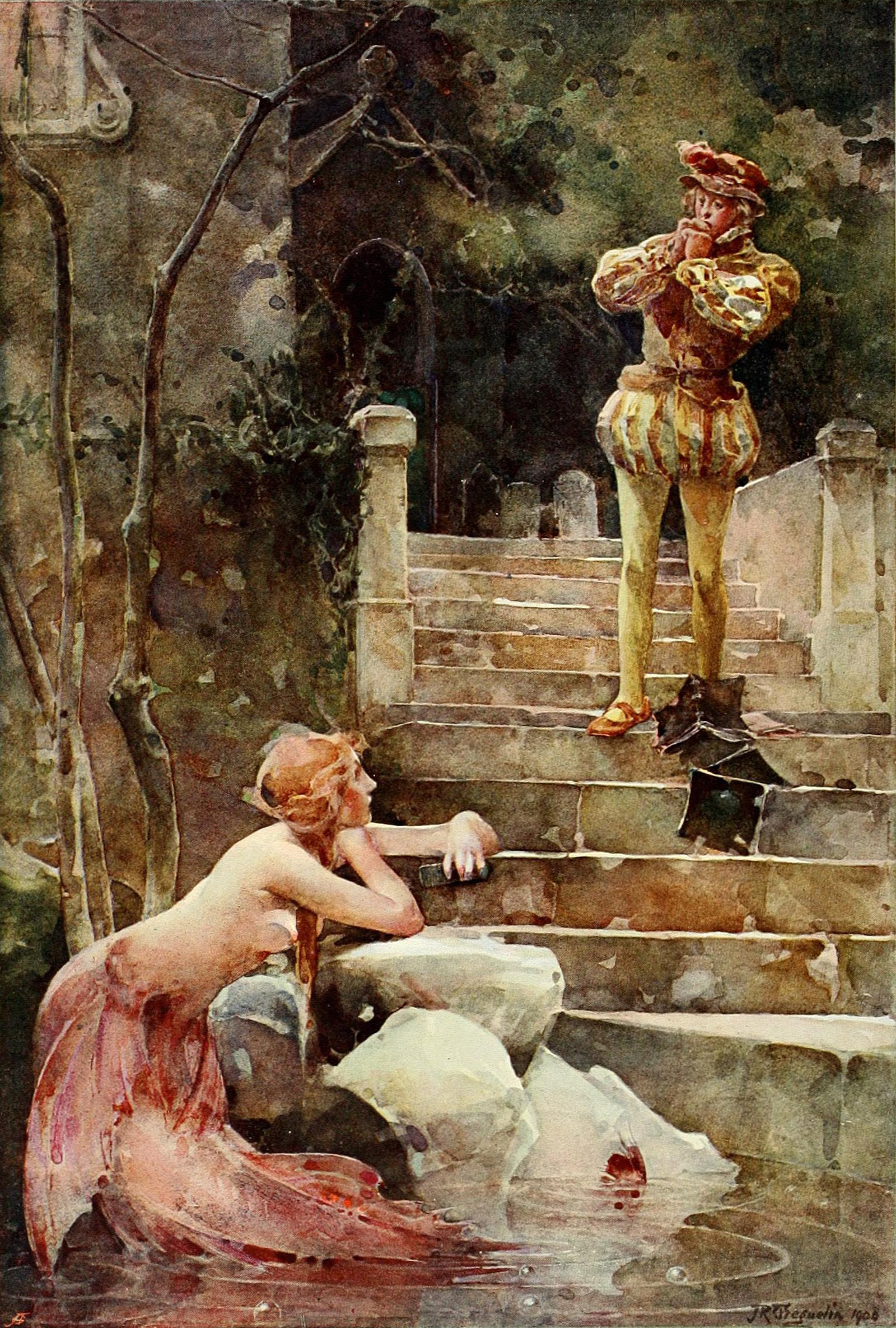
The Mermaid of Zennor by John Reinhard Weguelin (1900)

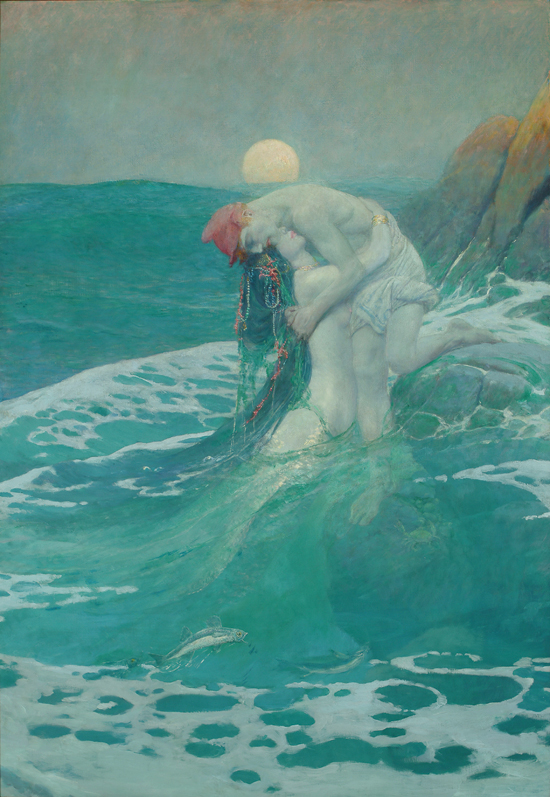
The Mermaid, by Howard Pyle (1910)

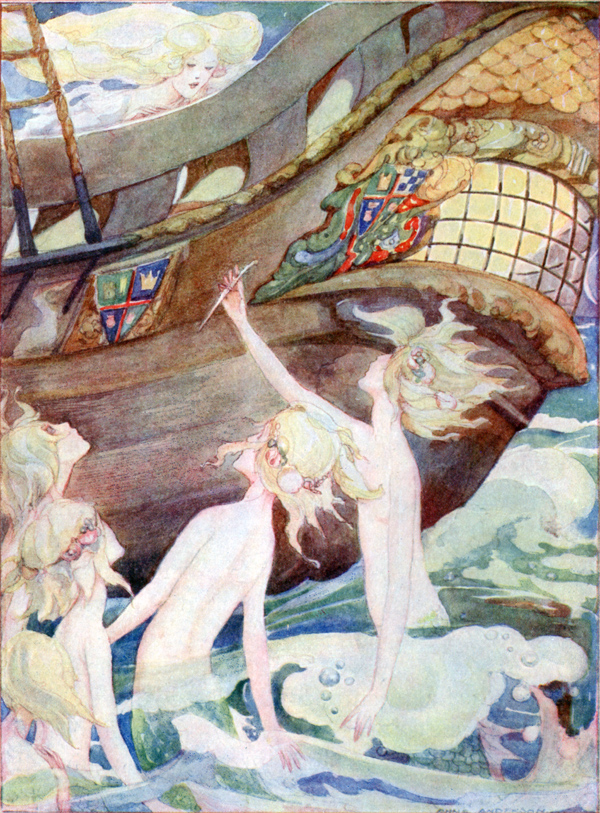
The Little Mermaid's Sisters by Anne Anderson (c. 1910)

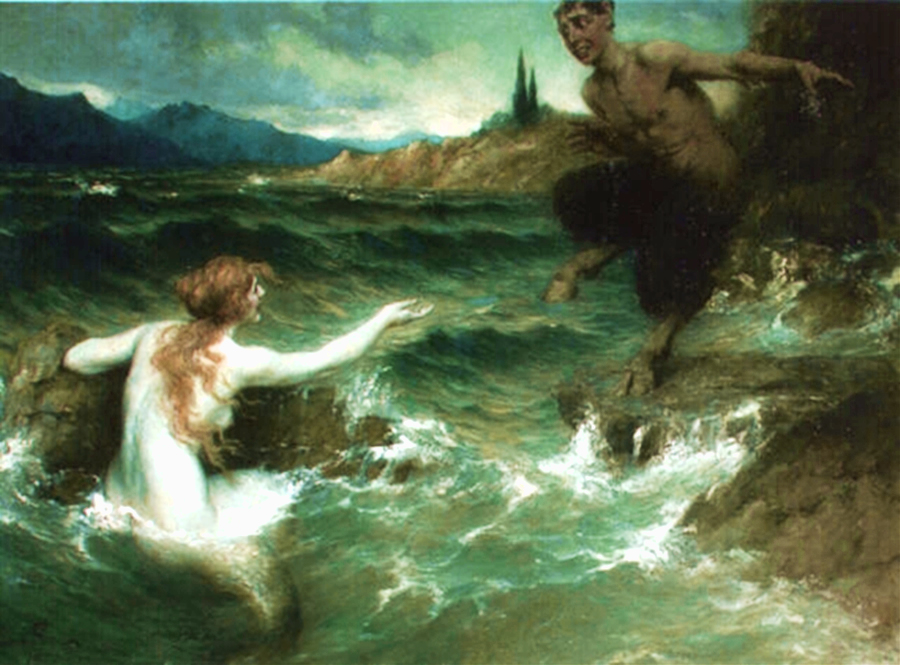
The Mermaid and the Satyr, by Ferdinand Leeke (1917)

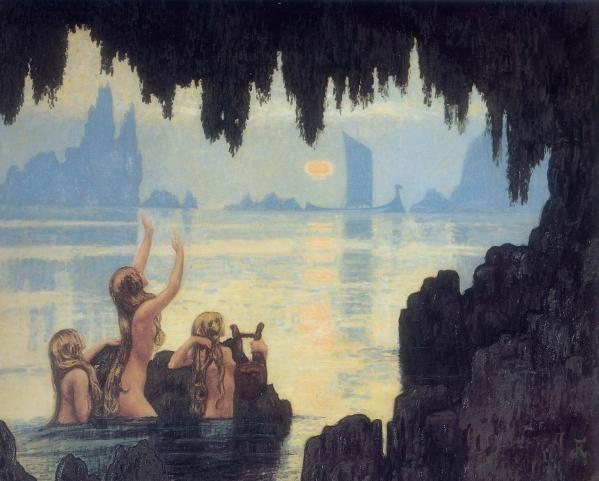
Mermaids, by Jean Francis Auburtin (c. 1920)

=== Sculptures ===
The Little Mermaid statue in Copenhagen (1913)

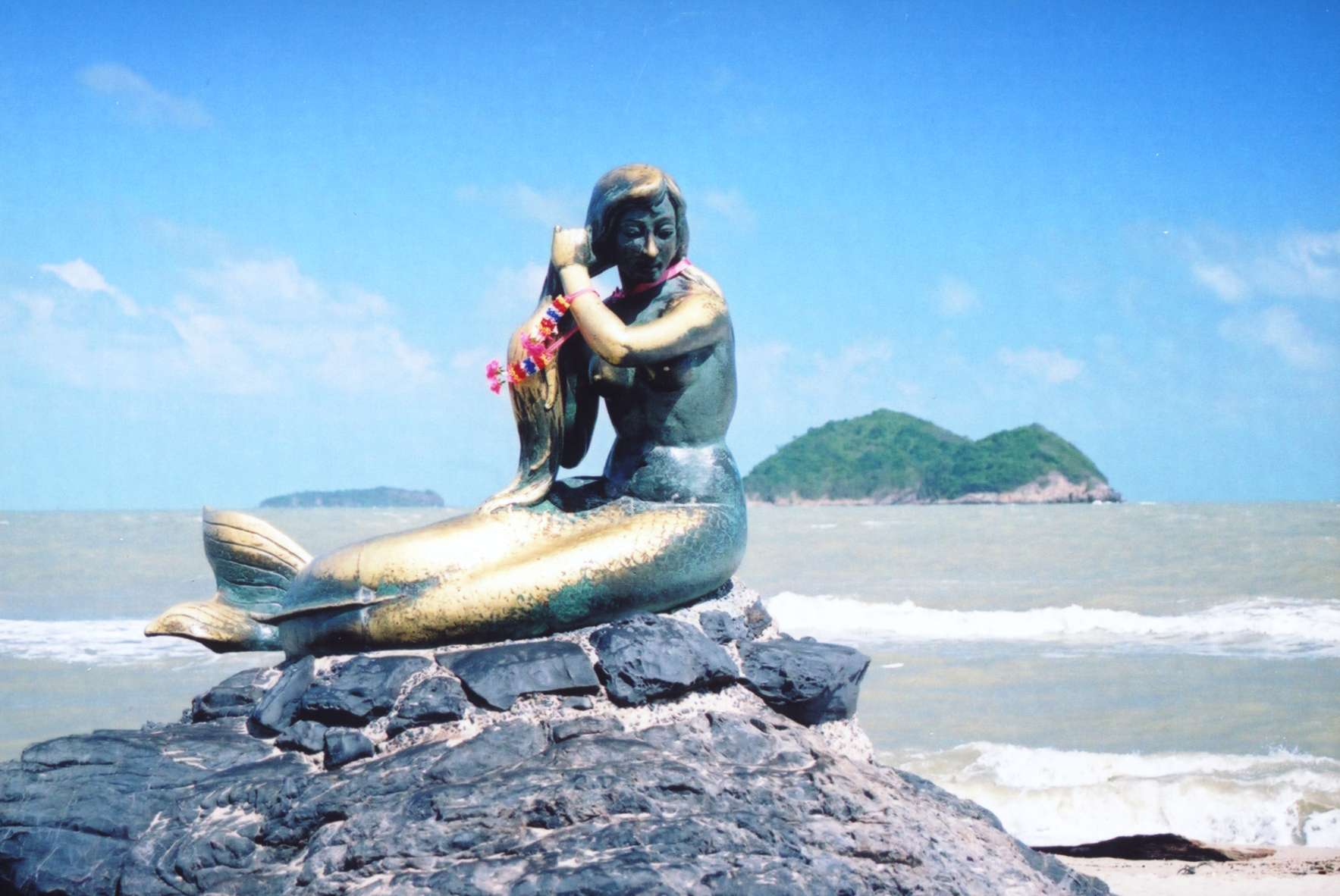
The mermaid of the Phra Aphai Mani legend in Songkhla, Thailand (2006)

=== Carvings ===
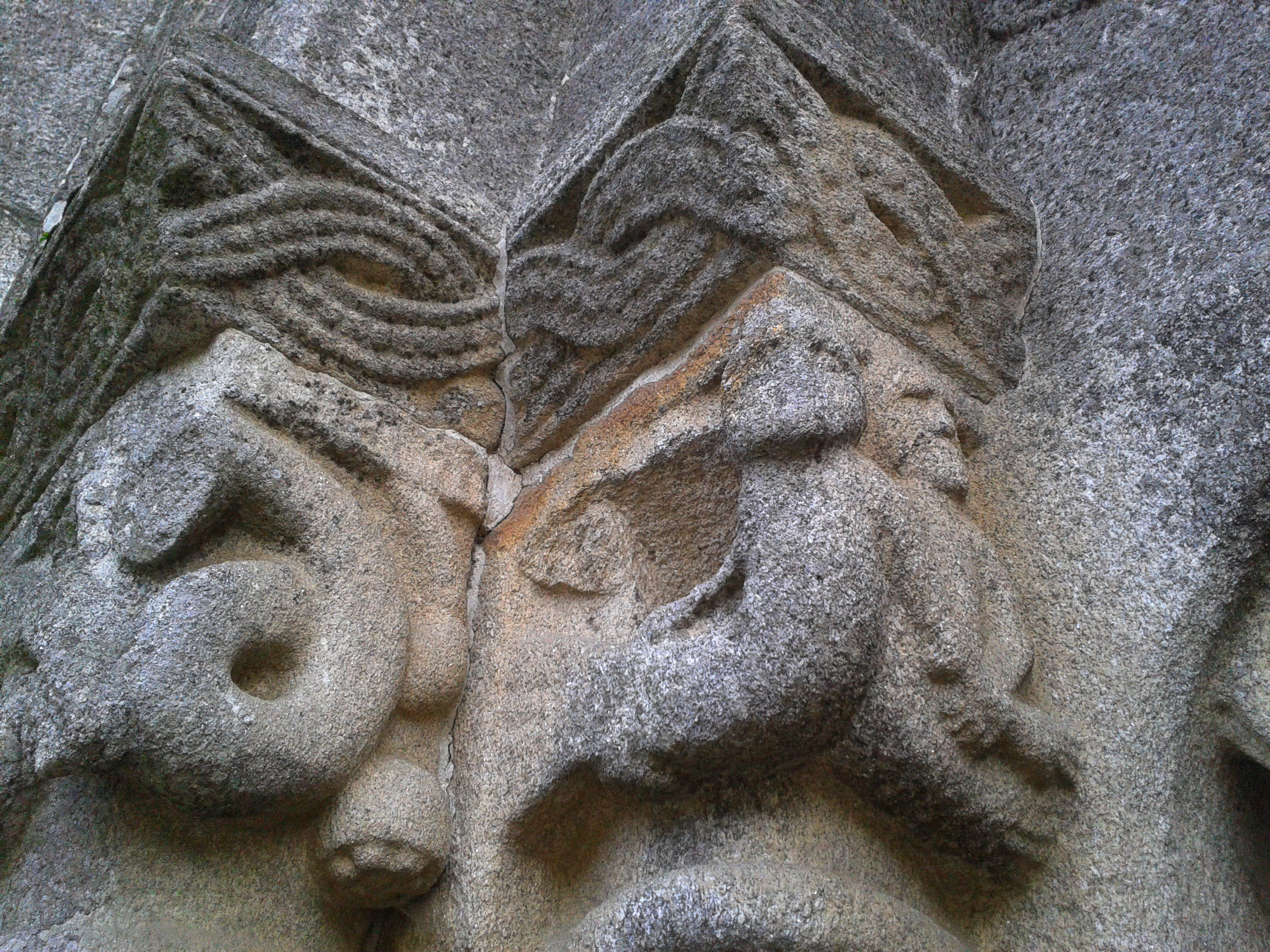
Mermaid carved on a capital of the Rio Mau Monastic church, Portugal (1151).

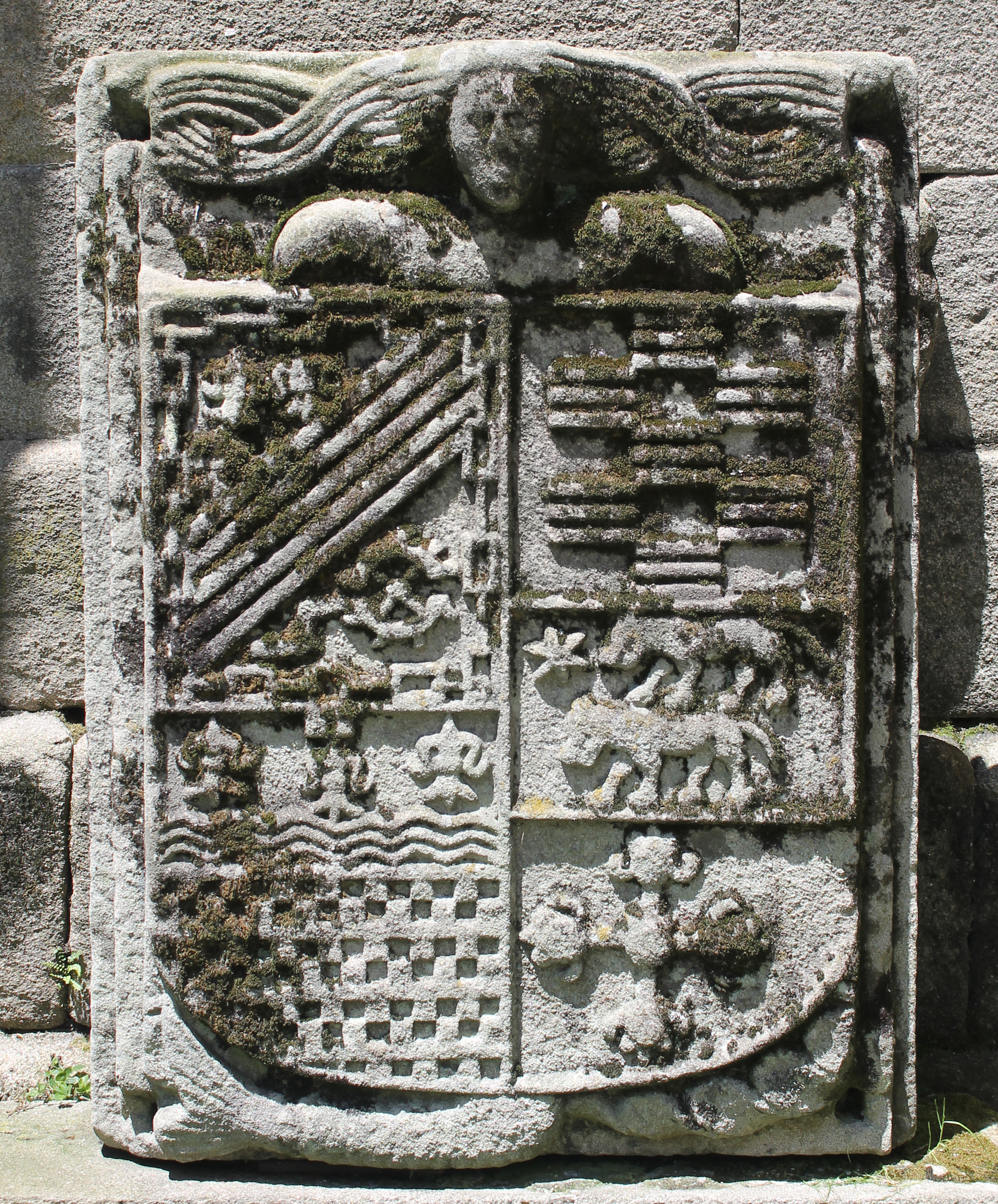
A stone coat of arms in Santo Domingo church (Pontevedra, Galicia, Spain), sixteenth century.

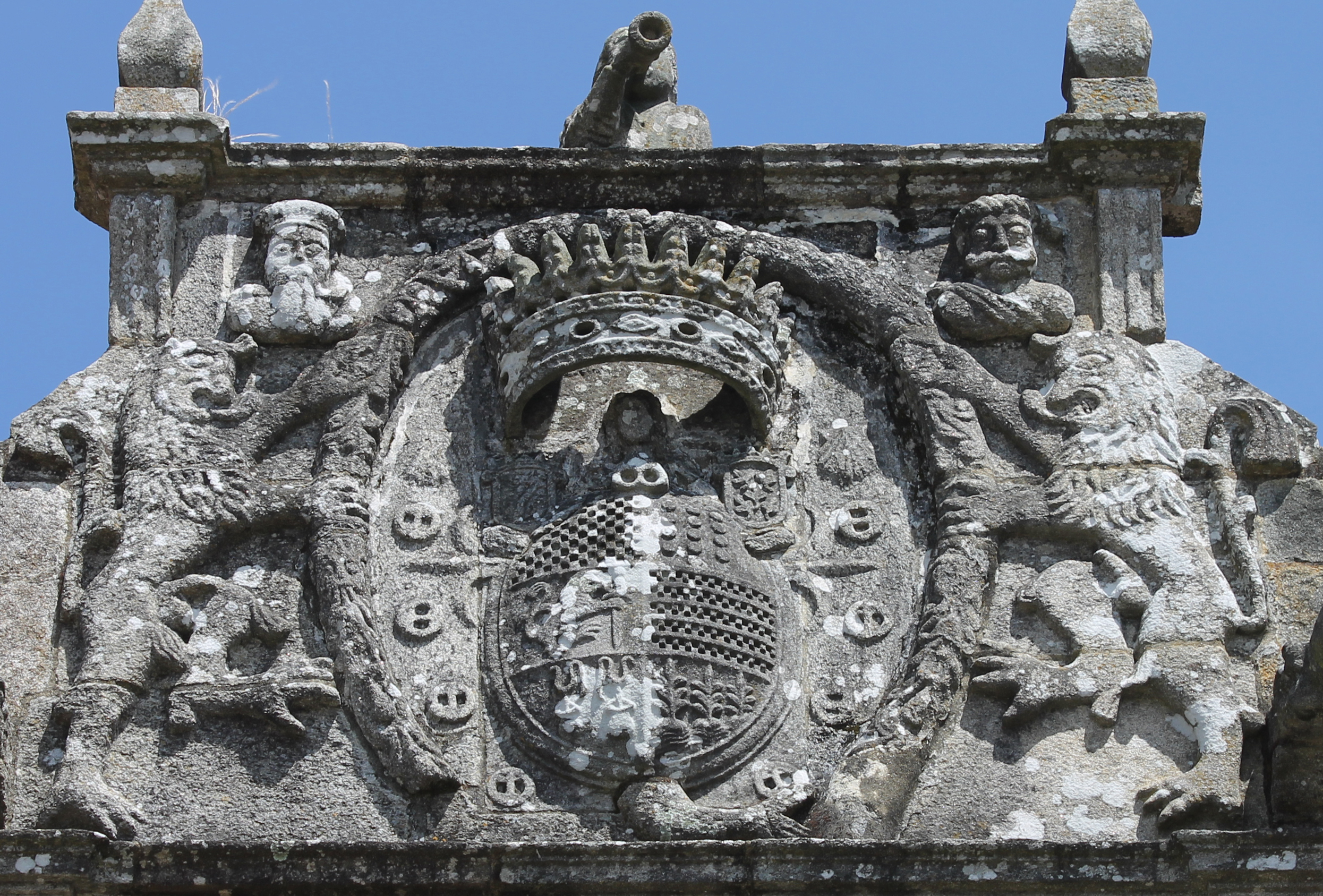
Mermaid in Fefiñans Manor house (Cambados, Galicia, Spain), sixteenth century.

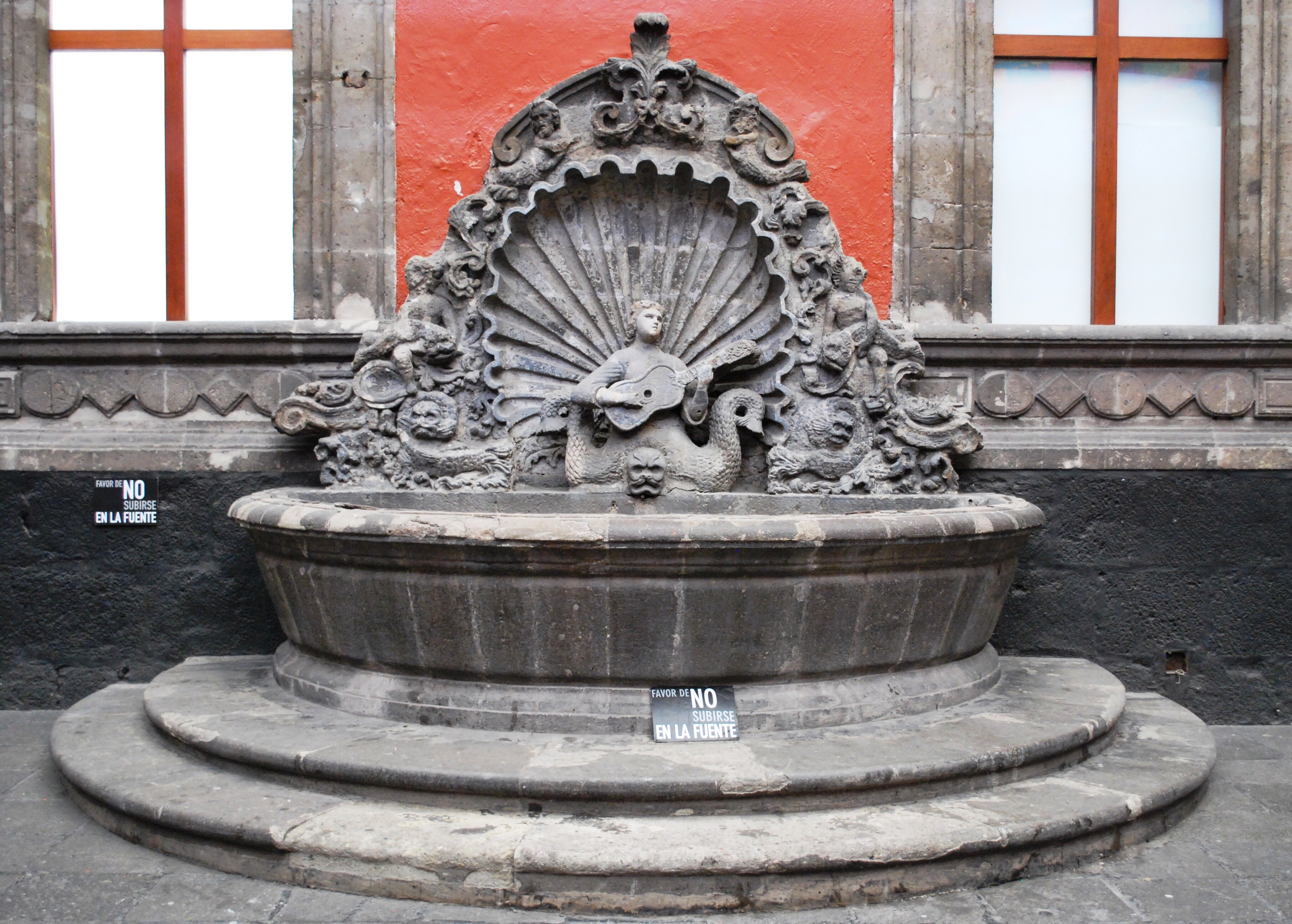
Fountain depicting a mermaid playing a guitar, located in the Museum of the City of Mexico (seventeenth century)

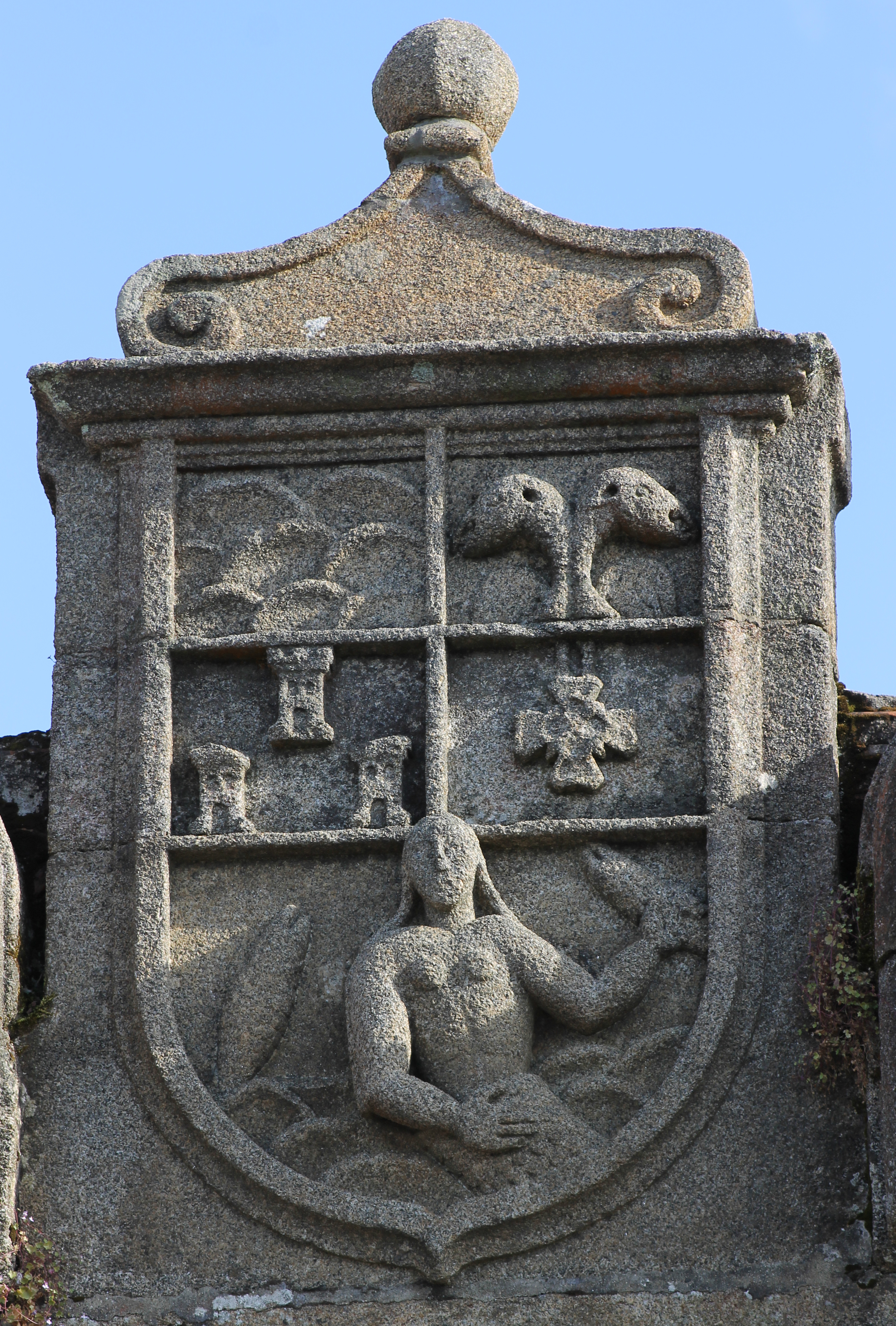
A stone coat of arms in (Mugardos, Galicia, Spain), eighteenth century

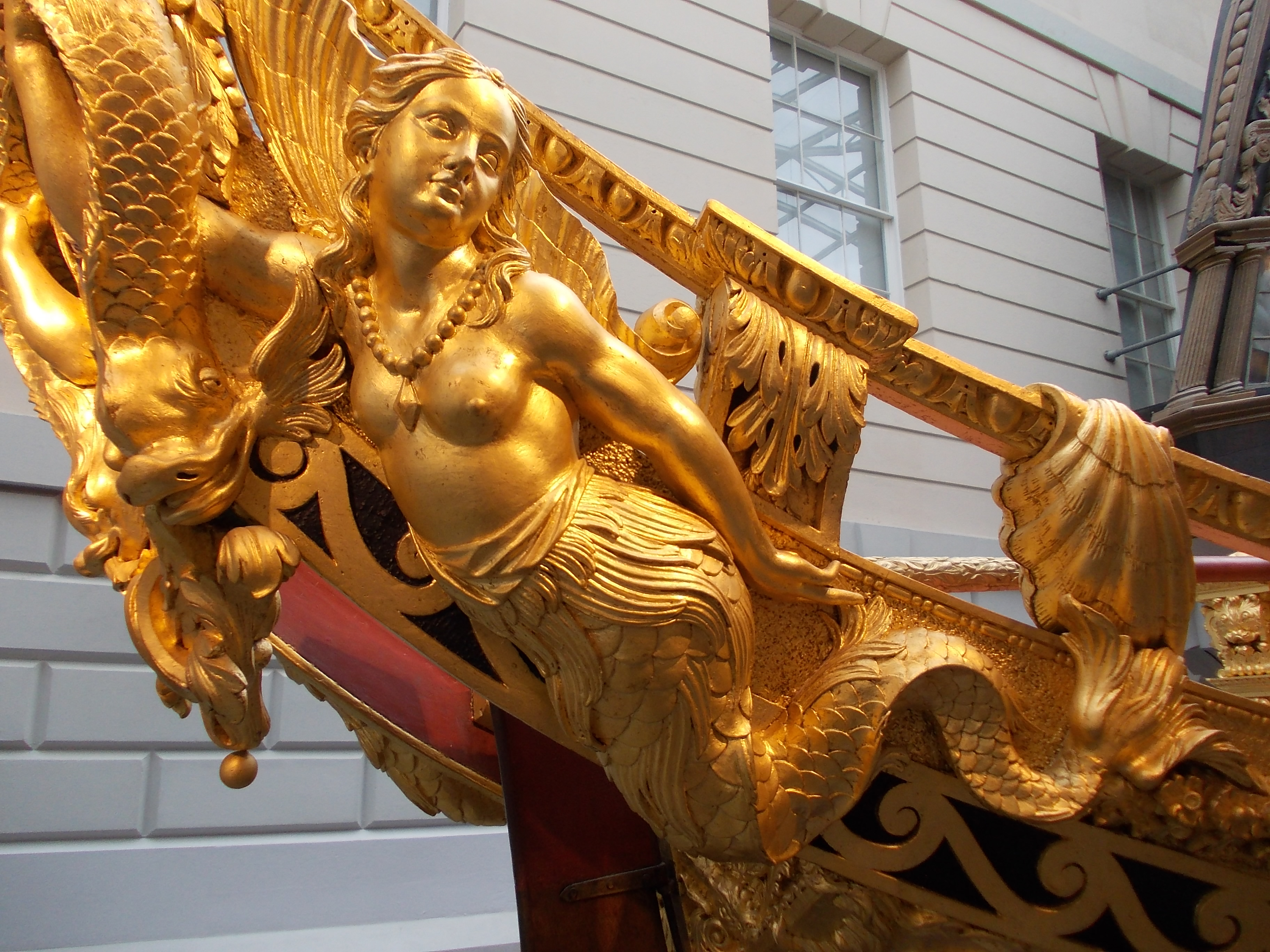
English carved decoration by James Richards on Prince Frederick's Barge, 1731–1732

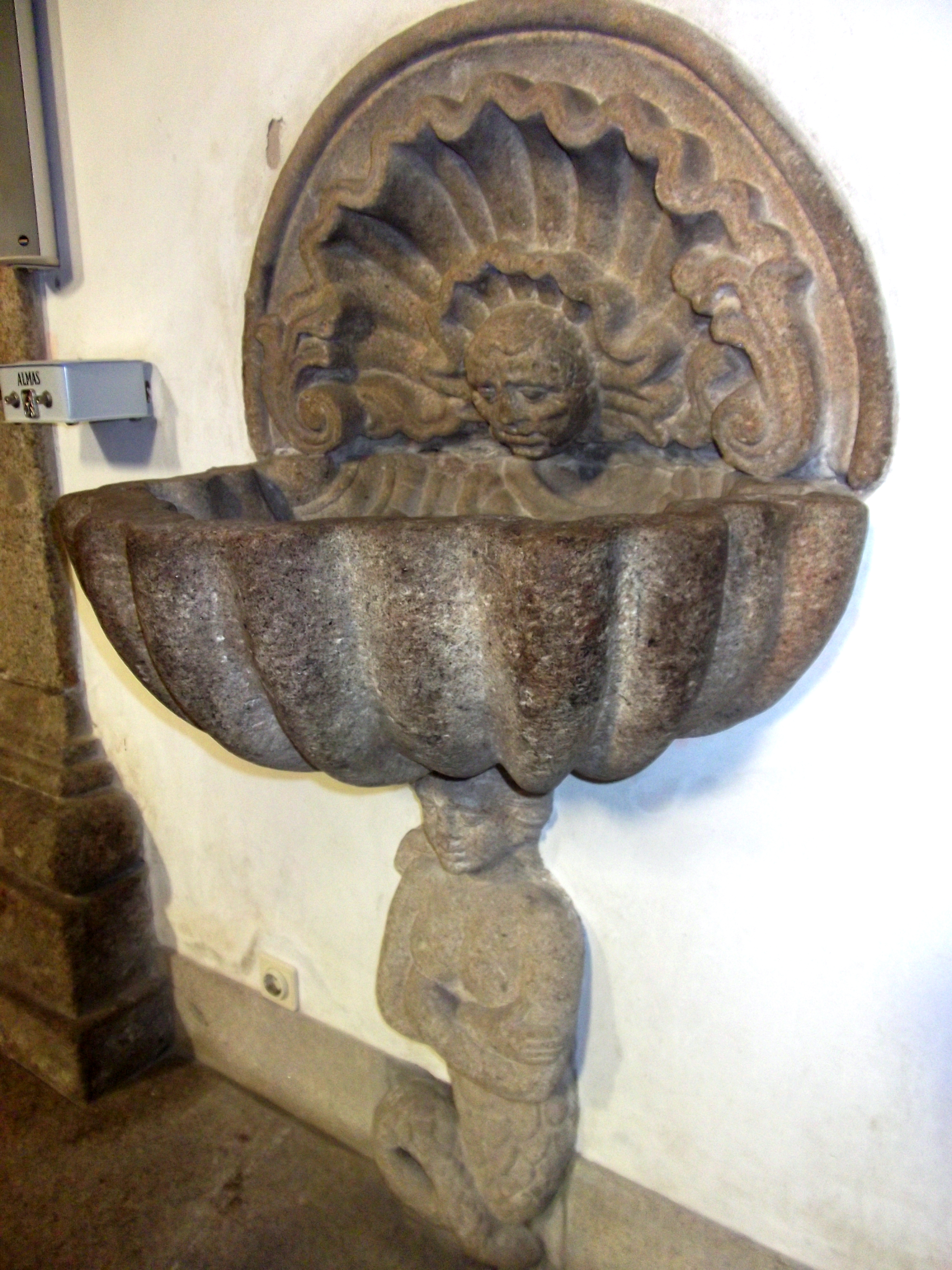
Portuguese Baroque stonework in Póvoa de Varzim Matriz Church (1743–1757)

=== Other uses ===
A mermaid in the coat of arms of the Päijät-Häme region, Finland (1997)

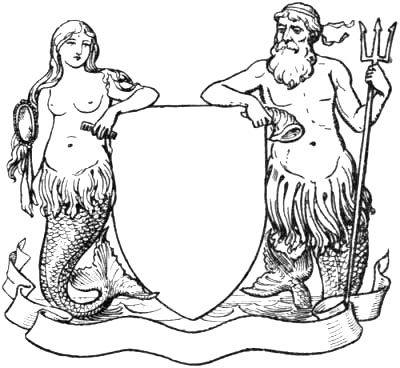
A mermaid and a merman as heraldic supporters.

== See also ==
- Mermaid in novels
- Ichthyosis
- Kelpie
- List of piscine and amphibian humanoids
- Little Mermaids Bridge
- Melusine
- Merlion
- The Mermaid of Warsaw
- Merman
- Mythological hybrid
- Nereid
- Sea monster
- Sea witch
- Selkie
- Siren (mythology)
- Sirenia – an order of aquatic mammals that includes manatees and dugongs.
- Sirenomelia – or "mermaid syndrome", a disorder in which a child is born with legs fused together.
- Susulu (mythology)
- Thessalonike of Macedon § Legend of Thessalonike
- Undine
- William Bond (author)
