= Merman =

Legendary aquatic man-like being

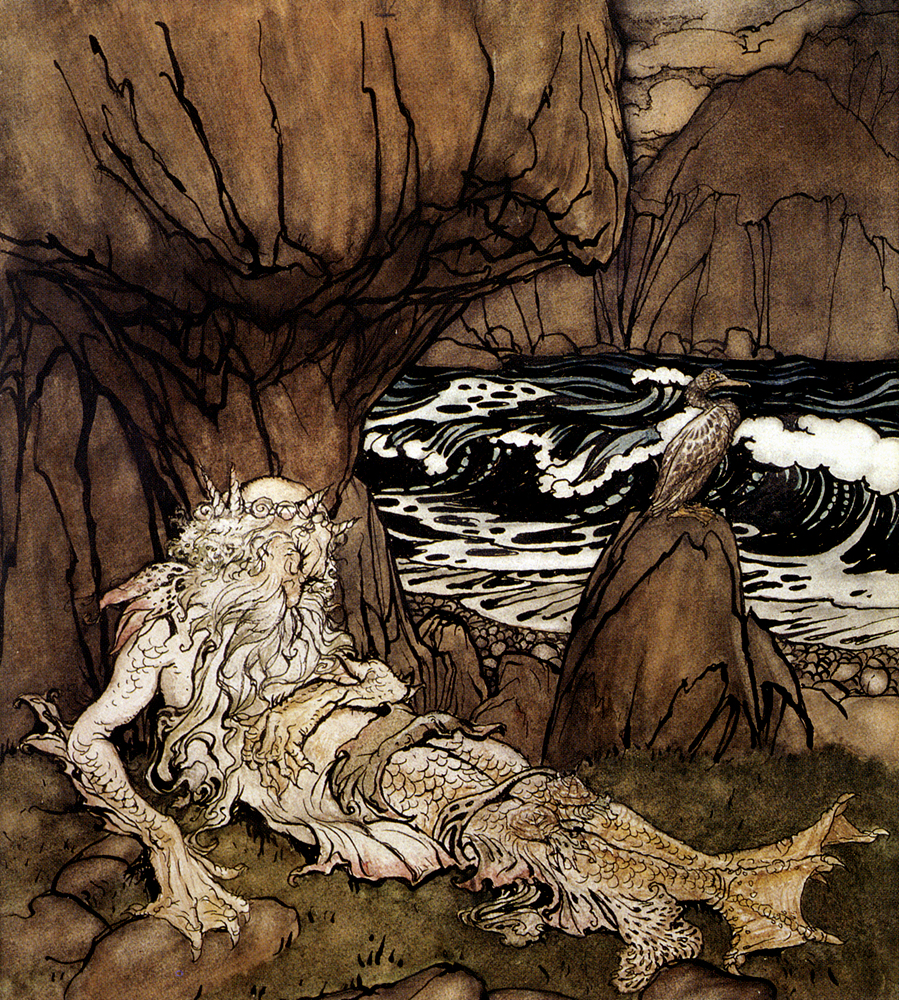
- A Crowned Merman, by Arthur Rackham

Creature information
- Grouping: Mythological
- Sub grouping: Water spirit

Origin
- Country: Worldwide

A merman (pl. mermen; also merlad or merboy in youth), the male counterpart of the mythical female mermaid, is a legendary creature which is human from the waist up and fish-like from the waist down, but may assume normal human shape. Sometimes mermen are described as hideous and other times as handsome.

== Antiquity ==
Perhaps the first recorded merman was the Assyrian-Babylonian sea-god Ea (called Enki by the Sumerians), linked to the figure known to the Greeks as Oannes. However, while some popular writers have equated Oannes of the Greek period to the god Ea, Oannes was rather one of the apkallu servants to Ea.

The apkallu have been described as "fish-men" in cuneiform texts, and if Berossus is to be believed, Oannes was indeed a being possessed of a fish head and man's head beneath, and both a fish tail and manlike legs. (Note: Berrosus, as preserved by Alexander Polyhistor.) But Berossus was writing much later during the era of Greek rule, engaging in the "construction" of the past. Thus even though figurines have been unearthed to corroborate this fish-man iconography, these can be regarded as representing "human figures clad in fish cloaks", rather than a being with a fish head growing above the human head. And the god Ea is also seen as depicted wearing a fish cloak by modern scholars.

=== Greco-Roman mythology ===
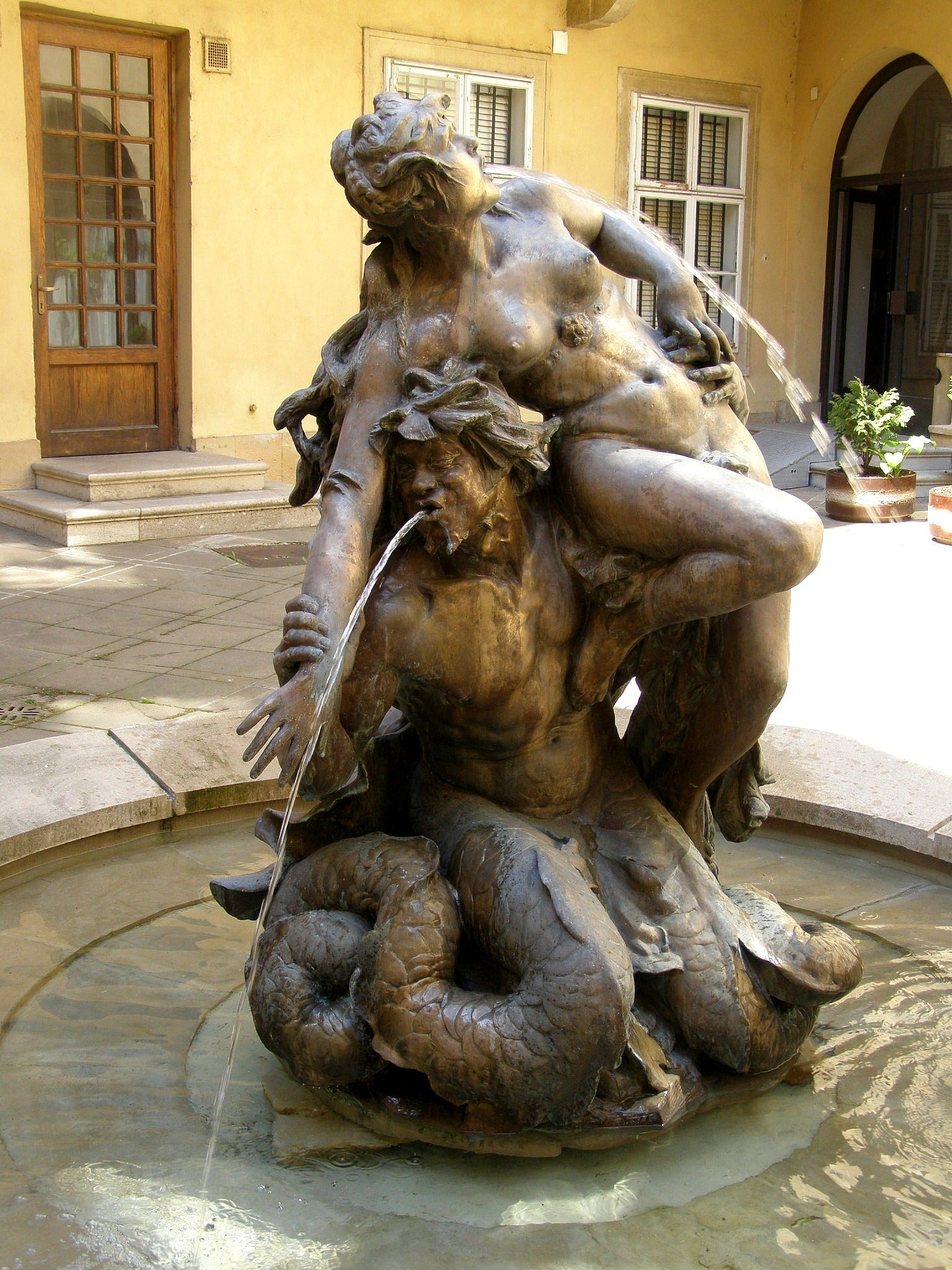
Triton with a nymph, Mirbach Palace Courtyard, Bratislava, Slovakia

Triton of Greek mythology was depicted as a half-man, half-fish merman in ancient Greek art. Triton was the son of the sea-god Poseidon and sea-goddess Amphitrite. Neither Poseidon nor Amphitrite were merfolk, although both were able to live underwater as easily as on land.

Tritons later became generic mermen, so that multiple numbers of them were depicted in art.

Tritons were also associated with using a conch shell in the later Hellenistic period. In the 16th century, Triton was referred to as the "trumpeter of Neptune (Neptuni tubicen)" in Marius Nizolius's Thesaurus (1551), (Note: It also occurs in Gesner (1558).) and this phrase has been used in modern commentary. The Elizabethan period poet Edmund Spenser referred to Triton's "trompet" as well.

Another notable merman from Greek mythology was Glaucus. He was born a human and lived his early life as a fisherman. One day, while fishing, he saw that the fish he caught would jump from the grass and into the sea. He ate some of the grass, believing it to have magical properties, and felt an overwhelming desire to be in the sea. He jumped in the ocean and refused to go back on land. The sea gods nearby heard his prayers and transformed him into a sea god. Ovid describes the transformation of Glaucus in the Metamorphoses, describing him as a blue-green man with a fishy member where his legs had been.

== Medieval period ==
=== Marmennill ===
A merman is called marmennill in Old Norse, attested in the Landnámabók. (Note: The Sturlubók version gives marmennill, while the Hauksbók gives margmelli.) An early settler in Iceland (c. 11th century) (Note: The settler was Grímr Ingjaldsson whose family hails from Haddingjadalr (Hallingdal), Norway.) allegedly caught a merman while fishing, and the creature prophesied one thing: the man's son will gain possession of the piece of land where the mare Skálm chooses to "lie down under her load". In a subsequent fishing trip the man was drowned, survived by the boy who stayed behind. (Note: This boy is identifiable as Þórir (anglicized as Thore).)

=== Hafstrambr ===
The hafstrambr is a merman, described as a counterpart to the hideous mermaid margýgr in the Konungs skuggsjá ("King's mirror", c. 1250). He is said to generally match her anthropomorphic appearance on the top half, though his lower half is said to have been never been seen. In actuality, it may have been just a sea-mammal (hooded seal, Cystophora cristata), or the phenomenon of some sea creature appearing magnified in size, caused by mid-range mirage.

Medieval Norsemen may have regarded the hafstrambr as the largest sorts of mermen, which would explain why the word for marmennill ('little mer-man') would be given in the diminutive.

Other commentators treat the hafstrambr merely as an imaginary sea-monster.

=== Early cartography ===
A twin-tailed merman is depicted on the Bianco world map (1436). (Note: This is replicated in the Vincenzio Formaleoni map of 1783 "Planisferio antico di Andrea Bianco Che si conserva in Venezia nella Biblioteca di S. Marc", LUNA, JCB Map Collection. The figure occurs at the far right.) A merman and a mermaid are shown on the Behaim globe (c. 1490–1493).

== Renaissance period ==
=== Gesner's sea-satyr ===
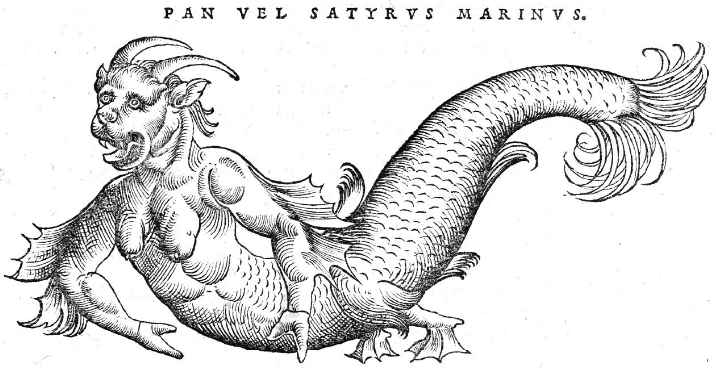
Sea-Pan or sea-satyr

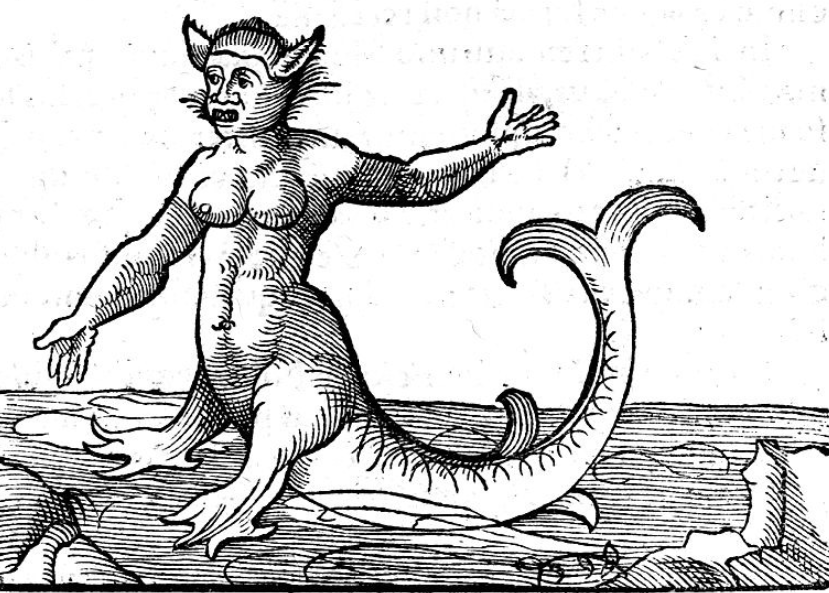
Sea-monster (monstrum marinum)
―Gesner (1558) Historiae animalium.

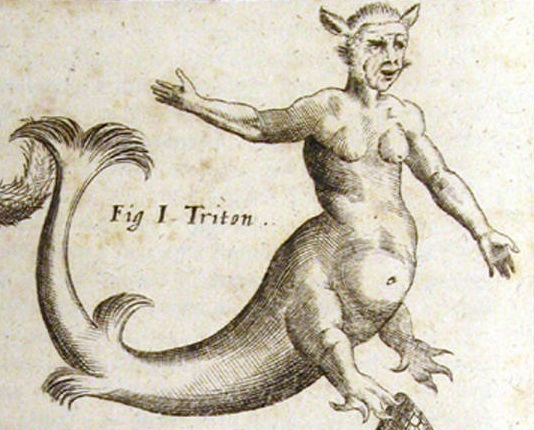
Triton
―Schott's Physica Curiosa (1697).

Konrad Gesner in his chapter on Triton in Historia animalium IV (1558) gave the name of "sea-Pan" or "sea-satyr" (Latin: Pan- vel satyrus marinus) to an artist's image he obtained, which he said was that of an "ichthyocentaur" or "sea-devil". (Note: Translation of Gesner's Latin passage given in: Benito Cereno. "Burgeoning Lads of Science".)

Gesner's sea-devil (German: Meerteufel) has been described by a modern commentator as having "the lower body of a fish and the upper body of a man, the head an horns of a buck-goat or the devil, and the breasts of a woman", and lacks the horse-legs of a typical centaur. Gesner made reference to a passage where Aelian writes of satyrs that inhabit Taprobana's seas, counted among the fishes and cete (Ancient Greek: κήτη, romanized: kḗtē, "sea monsters").

This illustration was apparently ultimately based on a skeletal specimen and mummies. (Note: Gesner's artist told him "he had received a drawing of a skeleton of such an animal in Antwerp. Also, another man brought back this monster dried from Norway to lower Germany, male and female".) Gesner explained that such a creature was placed on exhibit in Rome on 3 November 1523. Elsewhere in Gesner's book it is stated the "sea monster (monstrum marinum)" viewed on this same date was the size of a 5-year-old child. (Note: An illustration similar to Gesner's monstrum marinum was later printed by Kaspar Schott in Physica-Curiosa and labeled as "Triton". Llewellyn Jewitt has also reproduced an illustration quite similar to Schott's, claiming it came from Rondelet.) It has been remarked in connection to this by one ichthyologist that mermen created by joining the monkey's upper body with a fish's lower extremity have been manufactured in China for centuries; and such merchandise may have been imported into Europe by the likes of the Dutch East India Company by this time (cf. Bartholin's siren). Mummies (Feejee mermaids) were certainly being manufactured in Japan in some quantity by the 19th century or even earlier (cf. §Hoaxes and sideshows).

The "sea-satyr[e]" appears in Edmund Spenser's poem The Faerie Queene (1590), and glossed by Francis J. Child as a type of "ichthyocentaur", on the authority of Gesner.

== Scandinavian folklore ==
=== Marbendill ===
Icelandic folklore beliefs speak of sea-dwelling humans (humanoids) known as marbendlar (sing. marbendill), which is the later Norse, (Note: marbendil is attested in Hálfs saga (early 14th cent.).) and modern Icelandic form of marmennill.

Jón lærði Guðmundsson ('the Learned', d. 1658)'s writings concerning elves (Note: Halldor specifies Tíðfordríf and commentary on the Snorra Edda) includes the merman or marbendill as a "water-elf". This merman is described as seal-like from the waist down. Jón the Learned also wrote down a short tale or folktale concerning it, which has been translated under the titles "The Merman" and "Of Marbendill".

Jón Árnasson, building on this classification, divided the water-elves into two groups: the male marbendill vs. the female known variously as hafgýgur, haffrú, margýgur, or meyfiskur. But in current times, hafmey is the common designation of the mermaid. This gender classification however is not in alignment with the medieval source described above, which pairs the margýgr with the (hafstrambr).

=== Havmand ===
According to Norwegian folklore dating back to the 18th century, havmand takes the mermaid (havfrue) as wife, and the offspring or young they produce are called marmæler (sing. Norwegian: marmæle).

Norwegian mermen (havmænd) were later ascribed the general characteristic that they are of "a dusky hue, with a long beard, black hair, and from the waist upwards resemble a man, but downwards are like a fish." (Note: Thorpe who cites Faye as general source (p. 9, note 2), and translates Faye (1833)'s description in Danish: "mørkladne, have langt Skiæg, sort Haar og ligne oventil et Menneste; men nedentil en Fisk" (pp. 58–59). Faye cites Pontoppidan as a source (p. 62).) (Note: Pontpoddian had included a section on the latest sightings. One havmand allegedly seen in 1719 of particularly large size, measuring 3 fathoms (5.5 m), was dark-grey in colour; it had paws like the seal-calf (seal) but might be counted among the whale-kind, according to the commentator. Another seen in 1723 (taken from the writing of Andreas Bussæus 1679–1735) was like an old man, with curled black hair and black beard, coarse-skinned but shaggy. One witness noticed its body was taper-ended like a fish.)

While the marmæler does literally mean 'sea-talker', the word is thought to be a corruption of marmenill, the aforementioned Old Norse term for merman.

=== Prophesying ===
An alleged marmennill prophesying to an early Icelandic settler has already been noted (cf. §Medieval period). In the story "The Merman", a captured marbendill laughs thrice, and when pressed, reveals to the peasant his insight (buried gold, wife's infidelity, dog's fidelity) on promise of release. The peasant finds wonderful gray milk-cows next to his property, which he presumes were the merman's gift; the unruly cows were made obedient by bursting the strange bladder or sac on their muzzle (with the stick he carried).

=== Abductions ===
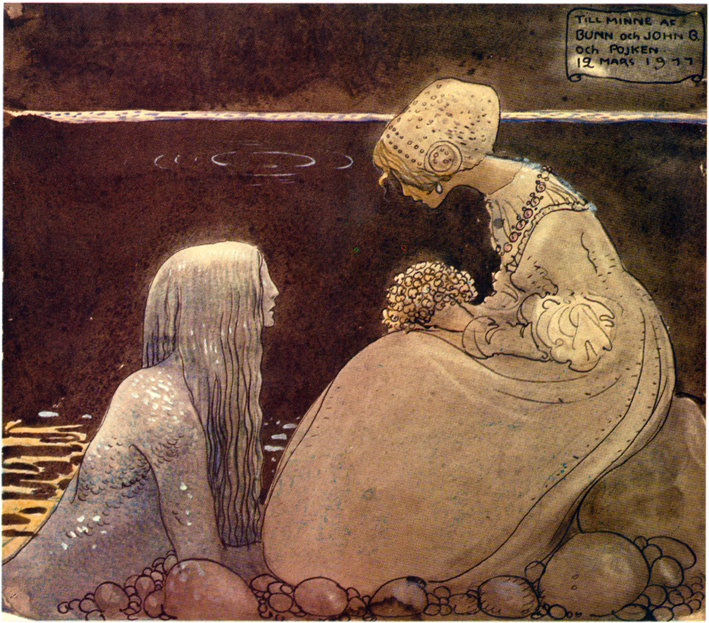
The merman (1911) by John Bauer

In Sweden, the superstition of the merman (Swedish: hafsman) abducting a human girl to become his wife has been documented (Hälsingland, early 19th century); the merman's consort is said to be occasionally spotted sitting on a holme (small island), laundering her linen or combing her hair.

There is a Swedish ballad (Swedish: visa) entitled "Hafsmannen" about a merman abducting a girl; the Danish ballad "Rosmer Havmand" is a cognate ballad based on the same legend.

"Agnete og Havmanden" is another Scandinavian ballad work with this theme, but it is of late composition (late 18th century). It tells of a merman who had been mated to a human woman named Agnete; the merman unsuccessfully pleaded with her to come back to him and their children in the sea.

== English folklore ==
English folklorist Jacqueline Simpson surmises that as in Nordic (Scandinavian) countries, the original man-like water-dwellers of England probably lacked fish-like tails. A "wildman" caught in a fishnet, described by Ralph of Coggeshall (c. 1210) was entirely man-like though he liked to eat raw fish and eventually returned to the sea. Katharine Mary Briggs opined that the mermen are "often uglier and rougher in the British Isles". (Note: However, it should be remembered that a polling of the folklore of the "British Isles" would include Irish folklore, and the story of the male merrow Coomara was Thomas Keightley's invention.)

Mermen, which seldom frequent American folklore, are supposedly depicted as less beautiful than mermaids.

== Celtic folklore ==
The Irish fakelore story of "The Soul Cages" features a male merrow named Coomara, a hideous creature with green hair, teeth and skin, narrow eyes and a red nose. The tale was created by Thomas Keightley, who lifted the plot from one of the Grimms' collected tales (Deutsche Sagen No. 25, "Der Wassermann und der Bauer" or "The Waterman and the Peasant").

In Cornish folklore into early modern times, the Bucca, described as a lonely, mournful character with the skin of a conger eel and hair of seaweed, was still placated with votive offerings of fish left on the beach by fishermen. Similarly vengeful water spirits occur in Breton and Gaelic lore, which may relate to pre-Christian gods such as Nechtan.

== China and Japan ==
In China and in Japan, there are various accounts of "human-fish" (人魚, Chinese: rényú, Japanese: ningyo), and these presumably occurred in male forms also.

However, Chinese human-fish have been described (and illustrated) as resembling a catfish, and not quite so human-like (cf. merfolk#Renyu or human-fish).

Illustrated depictions of male ningyo do exist from the Edo Period (cf. Ningyo§Male ningyo). One example is the picture of male human-fish (男人魚, otoko ningyo) hand-copied by the young lord of Hirosaki Domain. Another is the illustrated sheet of kawaraban newspaper carrying news of the "ningyo from Holland" (阿蘭陀渡り人魚), bearing the face of an old man. (Note: This newsprint was also featured in the manga Hōzuki no Reitetsu Vol. 12, p. 101, with a facsimile sketch of the print, and was offered as an example of a male ningyo. The comic cited Abe & Chiba (1996), without indication of page.)

=== Hairen or kaijin ===
In China and Japan there are also accounts of the "sea human" (海人, Chinese: hairen, Japanese: kaijin), some of these accounts are of European origin.

A known description of the hairen occurs in a work in Chinese called Zhifang waiji (職方外紀), actually written by a European. Here Ai Rulüe (Giulio Aleni) stated that there are two kinds of hairen. The example of the first kind had a beard. (Note: Chinese: 須/鬚 or "beard". But had to be released back to sea, upon which it was seen "clapping its hands and laughing loudly".)

The second type of hairen described by Aleni was actually a female woman, (Note: Chinese: 女人) identifiable as the Mermaid of Edam captured in 1403, with drooping skin, as if she were dressed in [a pao 袍 type of robe]. (Note: The text reads paofu 袍服, which is a somewhat specific type of formal attire, even though Mangani translated it as "non-removable cloth".)

Later, a Japanese source (Nagasaki bunkenroku) gave description of the kaijin encompassing features of both types: it had chin hair (Note: And eyebrows, and webbed skin between the fingers and toes.) as well as a skin flap around the waist similar to a hakama. These trouser-like hakama was worn by men, as well as women in some cases.

An older (though perhaps lesser known) account of hairen occurs in Shaozi or Shao Yong's work called Caomuzi (草木子), which describes the creature as having the shape of a (Buddhist) priest, though diminutive in stature. It has been equated with the umibōzu ("sea-priest, sea acolyte priest") yōkai of Japan.

== Folklore elsewhere ==
In Finnish mythology, a vetehinen, a type of neck, is sometimes portrayed as a magical, powerful, bearded man with the tail of a fish. He can cure illnesses, lift curses and brew potions, but he can also cause unintended harm by becoming too curious about human life.

In the Inuit folklore of Greenland and northern Canada, the Auvekoejak is a furry merman.

In an Italian folktale with medieval roots, Cola Pesce (Nicholas Fish) was a human boy until his mother cursed him to become part fish. As a merman, he occasionally assisted fishermen, but was summoned by a king who ordered him to explore the seabed and bring back items. Cola Pesce reluctantly went on the king's errands, only to disappear.

The boto (river dolphins) of the Amazon River regions of northern Brazil, is described according to local lore as taking the form of a human or merman, also known as encantado ("enchanted one" in Portuguese) and with the habit of seducing human women and impregnating them.

In the folklore of the Dogon of Mali, ancestral spirits called Nommo had humanoid upper torsos, legs and feet, and a fish-like lower torso and tail.

== In heraldry ==
Merman pictured in the coat of arms of Vörå, Finland

Mermen or "tritons" see uncommon use in British heraldry, where they appear with the torso, head and arms of a man upon the tail of a fish. They are typically used as supporters, and are rarely used as charges.

== Hoaxes and sideshows ==
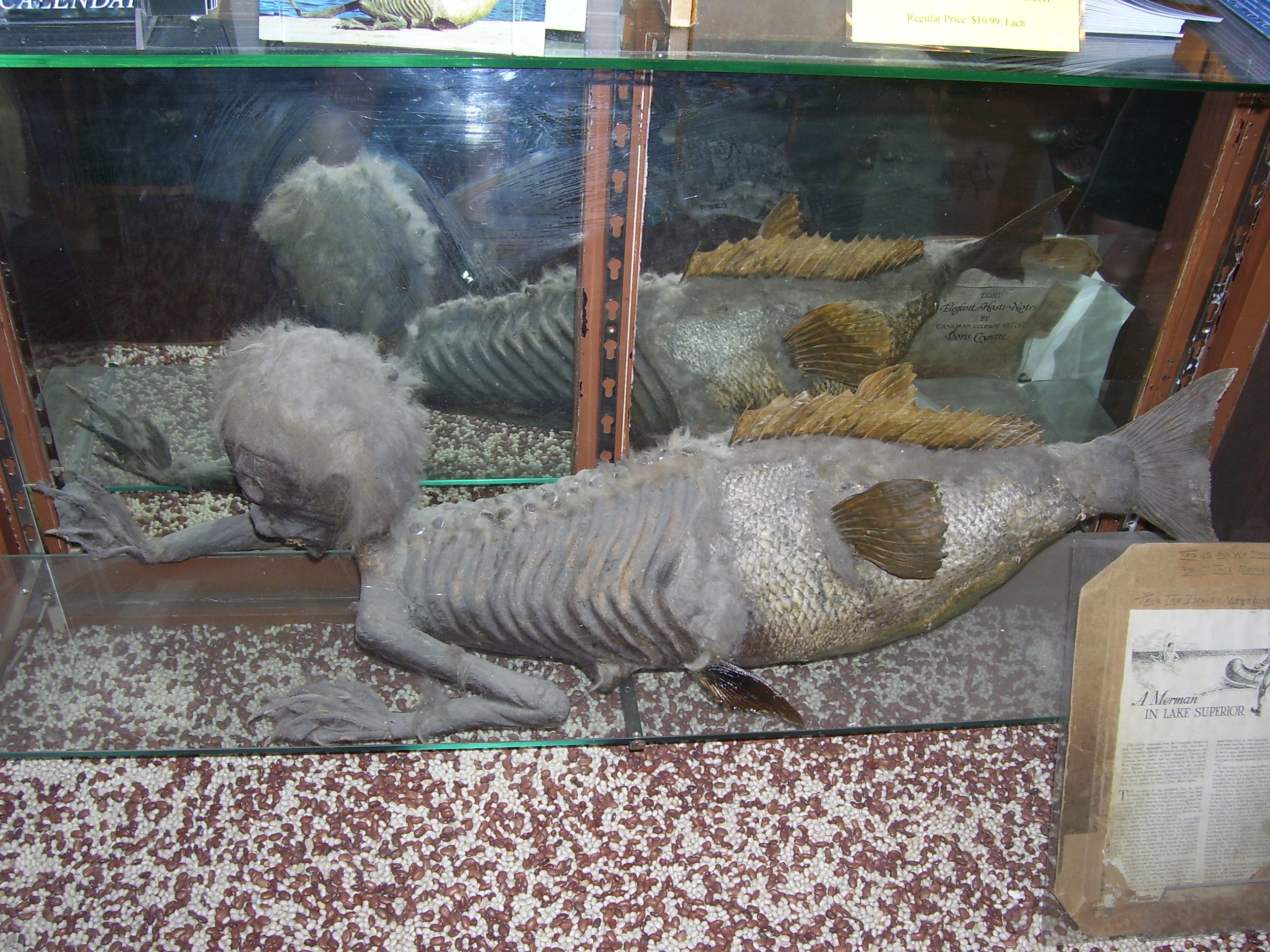
The Banff "merman" on display at the Indian Trading Post, Banff, Alberta

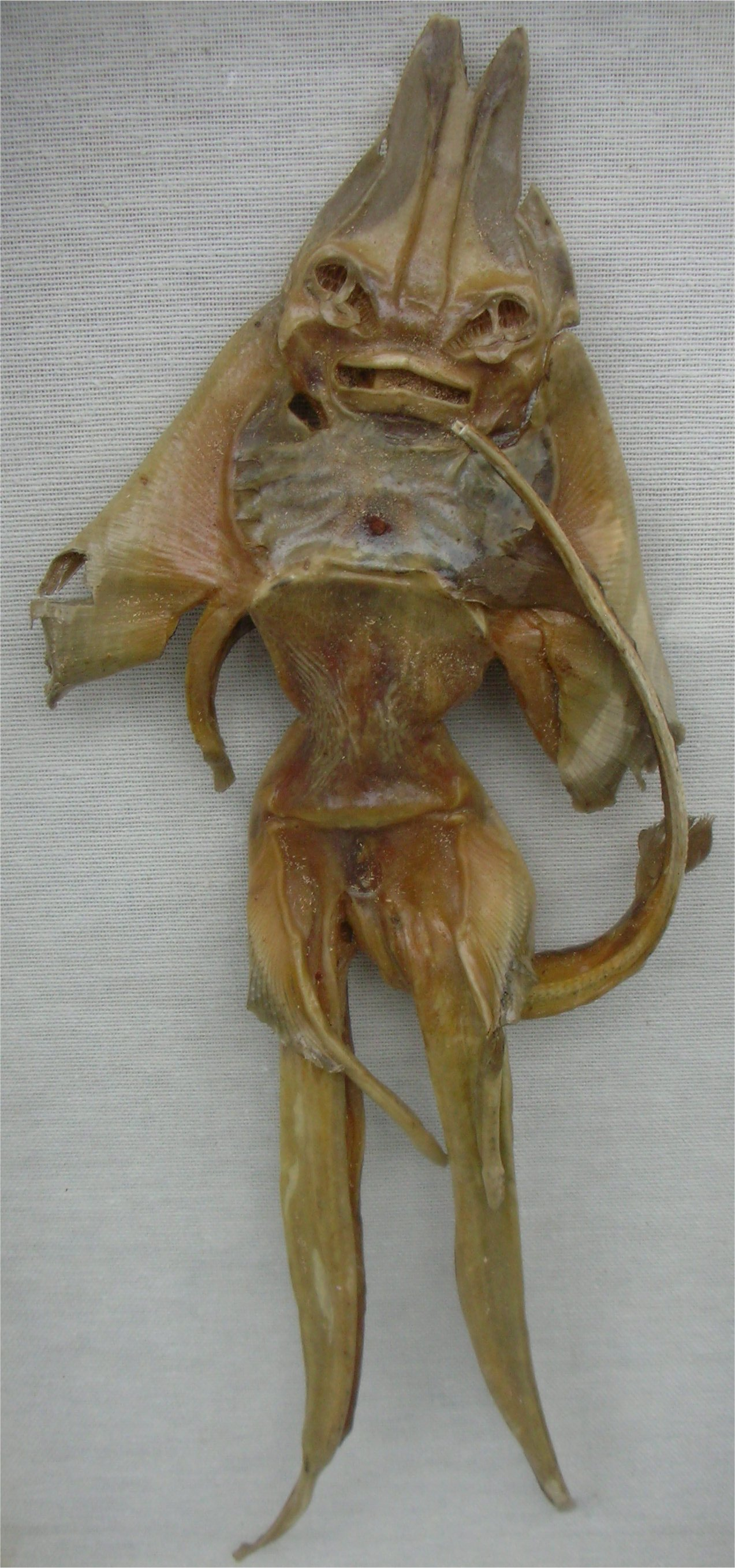
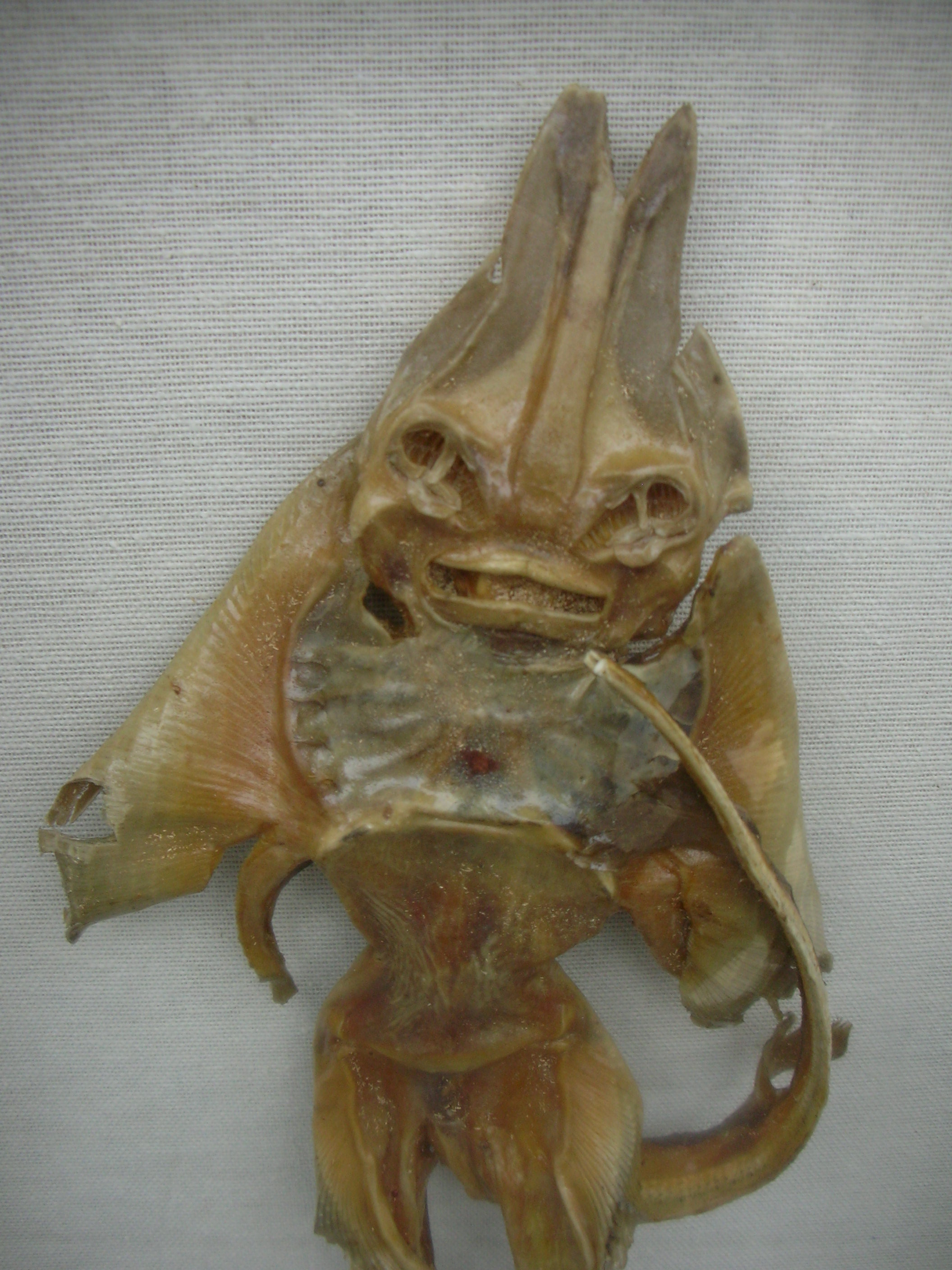
A dried ray or skate, or Jenny Haniver, on display at Mashhad Museum, Iran

A stuffed specimen of the merfolk was exhibited in London in 1822 was later billed "Fiji mermaid" by P.T. Barnum and put on display in the Barnum's American Museum, New York, in 1842. Although billed as a "mermaid", this has also been bluntly referred to as a "Barnum's merman" in one piece of journalism. This specimen was an example of fake mermaids posed in "The Scream" style, named after Edvard Munch's painting; mermaids in this pose were commonly made in the late 18th and early 19th century in Japan.

A similar fake "mermaid" at the Horniman Museum has also been relabeled by another curator as a "merman", where "mermen" or "feejee mermaids" are used as generic terms for such concocted mummies. DNA testing was inconclusive as to species (and nothing on gender was disclosed), but despite being catalogued as a "Japanese Monkey-fish", it was determined to contain no monkey parts, but only the teeth, scales, etc. of fish.

Another "merman" specimen supposedly found in Banff, Alberta, is displayed at the Indian Trading Post. Other such "mermen", which may be composites of wood carvings, parts of monkeys and fish, are found in museums around the world; for example, at the Booth Museum in Brighton.

Such fake mermaids handcrafted from monkeys and fish were being made in China and the Malay Archipelago, and imported by the Dutch since the mid-16th century, according to ichthyologist E. W. Gudger. Several natural history books published around this time (c. 1550s) carried entries on the mermaid-like monk-fish (sea monk) and the bishopfish (sea bishop), and Gudger suspected these were misinformation based on the aforementioned hoax mermaids from the East. (Note: Gudger notes as corroborating circumstantial evidence the fact that Guillaume Rondelet's source received description of the bishopfish from some informant in Amsterdam (and the Dutch were the importers of the mermaid mummies).)

Gudger also noted that the mermaid-like bishopfish could well be simulated by a dried specimen of a ray. A dried ray bears a vaguely anthropomorphic shape, and can be further manipulated to enhance its desired monstrous look. Such figures made of sharks and rays eventually came to be known as Jenny Hanivers in Great Britain.

== Literature and popular culture ==
Matthew Arnold wrote a poem called "The Forsaken Merman" about a merman whose human wife abandoned him and their children. Mermen may feature in science fiction and fantasy literature. The Merman's Children by American writer Poul Anderson is inspired by the ballad Agnete og Havmanden. Science fiction writer Joe Haldeman wrote two books on Attar the Merman in which genetically enhanced mermen can communicate telepathically with dolphins. Samuel R. Delany wrote the short story Driftglass in which mermen are deliberately created surgically as amphibious human beings with gills, while in J. K. Rowling's Harry Potter, a race of merpeople live in a lake outside Hogwarts.

Mermen sometimes appear in modern comics, games, television shows and films. Although they were once depicted largely as being unattractive in some traditions as described in previous sections, in some modern works, mermen are portrayed as handsome, strong and brave. In the 1977–1978 television series Man from Atlantis, the merman as played by Patrick Duffy is described as a survivor from Atlantis. In the DC Comics mythology, mermen are a common fixture of the Aquaman mythos, often showing a parochialistic rivalry with humanoid water-breathers. In the Supergirl comics of the 1960s, Supergirl had a relationship with a merman named Jerro, similar to Supermans relationship with mermaid Lori Lemaris. The mermen or merfolk also appear in the Dungeons & Dragons game. Three mermen are featured in the music video for Madonna's 1989 song "Cherish".

The Australian TV series Mako: Island of Secrets (2013–2016), a spin-off of H_{2}O: Just Add Water, includes a teenage boy named Zac (played by Chai Hansen) who turns into a merman. The 2006 CG-animated film Barbie: Mermaidia features a merman character named Prince Nalu.

The monster known as the Gill-man from the film Creature from the Black Lagoon could be seen as a modern adaptation of the merman myth.

== See also ==
- List of piscine and amphibian humanoids
- List of hybrid creatures in mythology
- Vodyanoy
- Fish-man of Cantabria, Spain
- "1983... (A Merman I Should Turn to Be)"
- Tezin Nan Dlo (Haitian folktale)
