= List of aquatic humanoids =

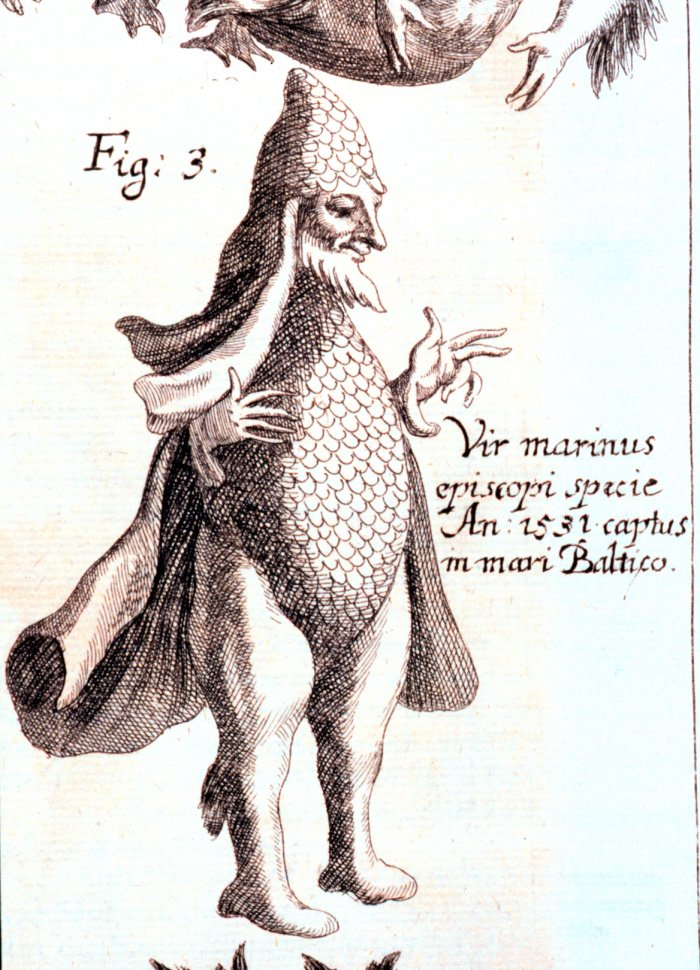
The bishop-fish, a piscine humanoid reported in Poland in the 16th century

Aquatic humanoids appear in legend and fiction. "Water-dwelling people with fully human, fish-tailed or other compound physiques feature in the mythologies and folklore of maritime, lacustrine and riverine societies across the planet."

== Myth ==
"Ancient sea deities" have been regarded as the "earliest version of a human-fish hybrid". Creatures with a human torso and the tail of a fish appear in the myths of cultures around the world and persist in contemporary popular culture.

== Piscine humanoids ==
Water-dwelling humanoids in legend and fiction have frequently been depicted with characteristics of fish.

=== Legend ===
- The amabie from Japanese folklore (Note: These creatures or characters have been described with piscine and/or other characteristics.)
- The ceasg in Scottish folklore has the upper body of a beautiful woman merging with the tail of a grilse (a young salmon)
- Finfolk from the folklore of Orkney
- Melusine in European folklore
- Merrows from Irish folklore
- The Ningyo from Japanese folklore
- Sirens were initially described as bird-like, but have become associated with mermaids in later folklore.
- The Umibōzu from Japanese folklore

=== Hoax ===
- Fiji mermaid, a taxidermic hoax perpetuated by P. T. Barnum.

=== Fiction ===
==== Literature ====
- Caliban from William Shakespeare's play The Tempest.
- The Little Mermaid, from Hans Christian Andersen's Fairy Tales (1837)
- The harbor master from Robert W. Chambers's story "The Harbor-Master" (1899)
- The fish man from Irvin S. Cobb's story "Fishhead" (1913)
- Ichthyander from Alexander Belyayev's Amphibian Man (1928)
- The Deep Ones from H. P. Lovecraft's The Shadow Over Innsmouth (1936) (Note: These creatures have been described with fish-like and/or frog-like characteristics.)
- The Myposans from Edgar Rice Burroughs's "Slaves of the Fish Men" (1941)
- Swimmers from C. M. Kösemen's All Tomorrows (2006)

==== Comics ====
- The Fish-Men are a race of fish-like humans from the Japanese series One Piece. They are modeled after different aquatic lifeforms. The Fish-Men can breed with humans to create half-Fish-Men, half-humans, or Giants to create Wotans.
- The Fish Men from Buck Rogers comic strips
- The Shark Men from Flash Gordon comic strips
- The Water People from Carl Barks's story "The Secret of Atlantis"
- Nina Mazursky from DC Comics
- Abe Sapien from the Hellboy comics
- Triton, Shark-Girl, and Squid-Boy from Marvel Comics
- The Trench in DC Comics

==== Films ====
- The sea people from The Mysterious Island (1929)
- The Gill-man from Creature from the Black Lagoon (1954)
- The Gill-man from The She-Creature (1956)
- The Gill-man from The Monster of Piedras Blancas (1958)
- The Gill-men from City Under the Sea (1965)
- The titular creatures from Humanoids from the Deep (1980)
- The mutant from Leviathan (1989)
- Chocki, the shark-man from Cabin Boy (1994)
- Sharkboy from The Adventures of Sharkboy and Lavagirl (2005)
- The Amphibian Man from The Shape of Water (2017)

==== Games ====
- Aulbath (a.k.a. Rikuo), a merman character from the video game series Darkstalkers, by Capcom
- Kuo-toa, "evil fish-men" from the Dungeons & Dragons role-playing game
- The Murloc are a species of amphibious creatures which live in tribes in World of Warcraft
- Neptuna, the mermaid-like boss in Croc: Legend of the Gobbos
- The Rokea, weresharks from the roleplaying game Werewolf: The Apocalypse
- The sahuagin from the Dungeons & Dragons role-playing game
- The tritons from the Dungeons & Dragons role-playing game
- Zoras from The Legend of Zelda

==== Television ====
- The Aquaphibians from the Stingray TV series
- The race of Cabira (one of Chilled's henchmen) is a race of fish-like humanoids from Dragon Ball
- The Fish People from the radio broadcast Alexei Sayle and the Fish People
- Gill (aka Gil Moss) from "Kim Possible"
- Goo, a mermaid character from Gumby
- Hippocampus from Krapopolis is a piscine humanoid. The episode "Prince Hippo" revealed that he is part of a race of Atlantean fish-men with his mother being the unnamed Queen of Atlantis.
- The Kanassans are a race of fish-like humanoids from the planet Manassas. They are said to possess psychic abilities, including being able to read minds and see into the future. They featured in the special Dragon Ball Z: Bardock - The Father of Goku
- Mer-Man from the Masters of the Universe franchise
- Molly, Gil, Goby, Deema, Oona and Nonny from Bubble Guppies
- Rayza from A.T.O.M.
- Sil and his race, the Mentors, from Doctor Who
- In the Dragon Ball Z series, the alien race of Sūi' (one of Frieza's foot soldiers) is a race of humanoid fish-like aliens who worked in the Galactic Frieza Army
- The TigerSharks from The Comic Strip segment of the same name

== Amphibian humanoids ==
Humanoid-amphibian characters have "been noted across ancient mythologies and, [...] in medieval cryptozoology", as well as fiction of the Western canon and popular culture. The combination invokes notions of humans' animalistic past, and the tension between the two attributes is used to "conceive monstrous and horrifying" and absurd creatures.

=== Legend ===
- The Loveland frog

=== Fiction ===
==== Literature ====
- Mr. Toad from The Wind in the Willows (1908)
- The Frogman from L. Frank Baum's The Lost Princess of Oz (1917)
- The Deep Ones from H. P. Lovecraft's The Shadow Over Innsmouth (1936)
- The Newts from Karel Čapek's War with the Newts (1936)
- Marshwiggles from C. S. Lewis's The Silver Chair (1953)

==== Comics ====
- Amphibius from Marvel Comics
- Frog-Man and the Ani-Men version of Frog-Man from Marvel Comics
- The Frog Monsters from the Hellboy comics
- Pepe the Frog, a comic character and Internet meme

==== Films ====
- The sea people from The Mysterious Island (1929)
- The Gungans from Star Wars (1999)

==== Games ====
- The Battletoads from the video game series of the same name
- Bullywug from the Dungeons & Dragons role-playing game
- The Murloc are a species of amphibious creatures from World of Warcraft
- The Salarians, a race in the Mass Effect series

==== Television ====
- The characters of Amphibia, a world of anthropomorphic frogs and other amphibians.
- Bullfrog from the adult animated show Captain Laserhawk: A Blood Dragon Remix
- Crazy Frog
- The Hynerians from Farscape
- The Hypnotoad from Futurama
- Kermit the Frog and Robin the Frog from The Muppets
- Michigan J. Frog, star of the Looney Tunes short One Froggy Evening and onetime mascot of The WB
- Queen Oona from Disenchantment belongs to a race of amphibious humanoids called Salamanders.

== Miscellaneous ==
Some water-dwelling humanoids in fiction and legend have been assigned characteristics of species other than amphibians or fish, or have been presented as "fully human formed aquatic humanoids".

=== Legend ===
- The Amabie from Japanese folklore
- The fuath, "malevolent humanoid water-spirits" from Scottish folklore and Irish folklore
- Kappa from Japanese folklore
- Melusine in European folklore
- The Neck from Scandinavian folklore
- Selkies, from Irish folklore
- The Umibōzu from Japanese folklore
- Undines in the writings of Paracelsus

=== Fiction ===
==== Literature ====
- Grendel and Grendel's mother from Beowulf
- The underwater people from H. G. Wells's story "In the Abyss" (1896)
- Caliban from William Shakespeare's play The Tempest.
- The seal-like Submen from Olaf Stapledon's Last and First Men (1930)
- The Salines (Salinos) from Sea Princesses (2004)
- Swimmers from C. M. Kosemen's All Tomorrows (2006)

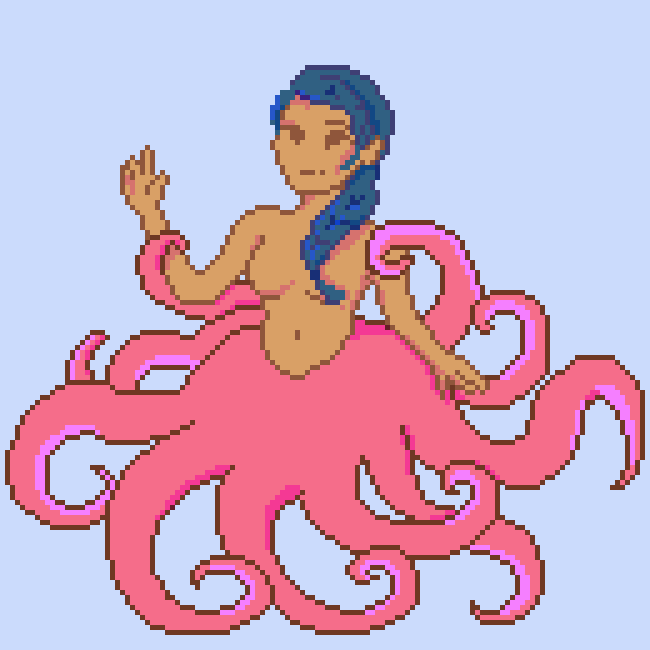
Cecaelia is a half human, half octopus.

==== Comics ====
- Aquaman from DC Comics
- The people of Atlantis, such as Namor, from the Marvel Universe
- Sobunar of the Depths from Marvel Comics
- Numerous shapeshifting characters from Marvel Comics have taken aquatic forms, including Marrina Smallwood, Darwin, Lifeguard, and Animalia.

==== Films ====
- Cecaelia – Half-human, half-octopus, the term was coined by fans in the late 2000s to describe characters such as Ursula from The Little Mermaid (1989).
- The Killer from Split Second (1992)
- The "Mariner" from Waterworld (1995)
- The Amphibian Man from The Shape of Water (2017)

==== Games ====
- The Argonians from Elder Scrolls
- The Naga are a species of aquatic humanoids under the command and leadership of Queen Azshara in World of Warcraft

==== Television ====
- Ben Tennyson can transform into different aquatic alien species, such as Ripjaws and Ampfibian
- Some characters in Nagi-Asu: A Lull in the Sea are humans having the ability to breathe underwater (called Ena)
- Polvina, Tubarina, Ester and others who live underwater from Sea Princesses (2007-2010)
- Sea Devils and Silurians from Doctor Who
- Sil and his race, the Mentors, from Doctor Who
- The TigerSharks from The Comic Strip segment of the same name

== See also ==
- Jenny Haniver
- List of avian humanoids
- List of reptilian humanoids
- List of hybrid creatures in folklore
- Insectoids in science fiction and fantasy

== General references ==
- Bleiler, E. F. (1990). Science-fiction, the early years : a full description of more than 3,000 science-fiction stories from earliest times to the appearance of the genre magazines in 1930 : with author, title, and motif indexes. Kent, Ohio: Kent State University Press. ISBN 9780873384162.
- Bleiler, E. F. (1998). Science-fiction : the Gernsback years : a complete coverage of the genre magazines ... from 1926 through 1936. Kent, Ohio: Kent State University Press. ISBN 9780873386043.
- Debus, Allen A. (2016). Dinosaurs ever evolving : the changing face of prehistoric animals in popular culture. Jefferson, North Carolina. ISBN 978-0786499519.
- Joshi, S. T. (1999). A subtler magick : the writings and philosophy of H.P. Lovecraft. Berkeley Heights, NJ: Wildside Press. ISBN 9781880448618.
