= Monkfish (disambiguation) =

The monkfish is a name for fishes of the anglerfish genus Lophius.

Monkfish may also refer to:

- Inspector Monkfish, a fictional character
- Sea monk, a marine monster of the Renaissance
- Squatina squatina, a shark with an unusually flattened body
- Stargazer, also called monkfish in New Zealand
