= Lucas Schan =

Lucas Schan (or Lukas Tschan, etc., active 1526–1558) was a natural history artist and wildfowler, known for his illustrations of birds for Conrad Gessner's Historia animalium, published at Zurich in 1551–58 and 1587.

Gessner acknowledges Schan in the book with the words:

Lucas Schan pictor Argentoratensis aves plurimas ad vivum nobis expressit, & quarundam historias quoque addidit, vir picturae simul et aucupii peritus
(Lucas Schan of Argentoratum [Strasbourg] most vividly depicted birds, and in some places also added a description that captured the bird's behaviour).

Schan is the only artist named by Gessner; he painted most of the bird illustrations for his bird volume, together by Gessner's account with some descriptive text. The illustrations (not all by Schan) were so much liked that they were brought out in a volume of their own in 1560, Icones Animalium. Authors such as Ilaria Mazzoleni state without evidence that Schan made most of the illustrations of animals throughout the Historia. Springer and Kinzelbach provide a slightly different quote from Gessner praising Schan:

Lukas Schan Argentoratensis pictor diligentissimus, & idem auceps...
(Lukas Schan, a most diligent painter of Argentoratum and the same as a wildfowler...)

Little else is known about Schan. It is recorded that Lucas Schan of Bornaia testified in Strasbourg in 1526, 1539 and 1544. The Strasbourg City book records also that on 22 November 1526 "Lux [Lucas] of Baranga called Schen, son of Jerg Schanen the sheepshearer, has paid for the right to work in the town [Burgrecht] and serves at Stelzgen".
