= Marmennill =

Being in Icelandic folklore

In Scandinavian folklore, a marmennill (pronounced /mɑɹ'mɛnɪtlᵊ/) (also marmandill, marbendill, or margmelli) is a merman that often features in stories after having been accidentally caught at sea by fishermen. The creature is typically known for its ability to see the future or to reveal otherwise hidden knowledge, often laughing when he sees others acting foolishly.

== Name ==
Marmennill has been variously translated as "merman", "mereman", "sea-mannikin" and "sea-goblin". In the Hauksbók version of Landnámabók, it is spelt as margmelli, with other medieval variants including marmandill. The modern Icelandic form is marbendill.

The name is also found as a component of the names of the species Millepora polymorpha and Corallina officinalis, which are known as marmendils-smíði ("the mermannikins work") and marmendils-þari ("the merman’s weed") respectively. It has been further suggested that the name of Merlin may be derived from marmenill.

== Attestations ==
=== Middle Ages ===
A marmennill is attested in Landnámabók:

Old Norse text	Modern English translation
Grímr hét maðr Ingjaldsson, Hróaldssonar ór Haddingjadal, bróðir Ása bersis. Hann fór til Íslands í landaleit ok sigldi fyrir norðan landit. Hann var um vetrinn í Grímsey á Steingrímsfirði. Bergdís hét kona hans, en Þórir sonr þeira. Grímr reri til fiska um haustit með húskarla sína, en sveinninn Þórir lá í stafni ok var í selbelg, ok dreginn at hálsinum. Grímr dró marmennil, ok er hann kom upp, spurði Grímr: "Hvað spár þú oss um forlög vár, eða hvar skulum vér byggja á Íslandi?" Marmennill svarar: "Ekki þarf ek at spá yðr, en sveininum, er liggr í selbelginum. Hann skal þar byggja ok land nema, er Skálm, merr yður, leggst undir klyfjum." Ekki fengu þeir fleiri orð af honum. En síðar um vetrinn reru þeir Grímr svá, at sveinninn var á landi. Þá týndust þeir allir.	There was a man named Grim, the son of Ingjald, the son of Hroald, from Haddingdale; he was the brother of Asi, a hersir. He went to Iceland to seek for settlement, and sailed by the north of the land; he was for one winter in Grimsey, in Steingrimsfirth; his wife was named Bergdis, and their son Thorir. Grim went out to fish in the Autumn with his housecarles and the lad. Thorir lay in the prow and was in a seal-bag which was drawn together at the neck. Grim drew up a mereman and when he came up asked him "What do you foretell shall be our fortune, or where shall we settle in Iceland ? The mereman answered, "No need to tell the fortune of you and your men, but rather of the lad that lays in the seal bag, he shall there settle and take land where Skalm your mare lays down under her load," and no more words got they from him. Later in the winter Grim and his men rowed out, but the lad was upon land; then the whole crew was lost.

Another prophetic marmennill appears in the 14th-century Hálfs saga ok Hálfsrekka. According to the saga, a father and son catch the marmennill on a fishing trip and subsequently present the creature to King Hjörleifr. The marmennill remains silent at the king's court, except for one bout of laughter. Upon being returned to the sea, however, he issues several prophecies in poetic verse.

=== Modern folklore ===
Stories about marmennill can be found in many modern Icelandic folklore collections, including in Jón Árnason's Íslenzkar þjóðsögur og æfintýri. One of the more well-known stories about the creature is known as Þá hló marbendill (And the marbendill laughed). It tells the story of a farmer who catches a marbendill out at sea and takes it home with him. On the way home, the creature laughs three times at the farmer. According to one account, the first time when his wife greets him, the second time when he hits his dog, and the third time when he trips over and attacks a tuft of grass. In exchange for his freedom, the creature reveals that he laughed at the farmer because his wife is unfaithful, his dog truly loves him, and the tuft of grass conceals a treasure. The farmer finally releases the creature and all that the creature claimed proves true.

== Interpretation and discussion ==
It has been noted that similar to the marmennill, some other beings in Scandinavian folklore could give indications on future events such as the sea monsters hafstramba and margýgr, which often are seen before storms and shipwrecks, and Óðinn, who in Böglunda sögur forebodes a large battle and death. Furthermore, in both Landnámabók and Hrafnkels saga Freysgoða there are account of a being appearing in the dream of a settler of Iceland, telling him to move to another part of the island. In each case, the settler heeds the advice and avoids a landslide which killed the livestock that stayed behind.

== Modern influence ==
The phrase þá hló marbendill ("then the merman laughed") is used in Iceland to refer to a sudden and spiteful fit of laughter in reference to the motif in folktales.

== See also ==
- Nixie (folklore), a water dwelling being in Germanic folklores
- Selkie, a being in Northern European folklores that could take on the form of a seal

== Bibliography ==
=== Primary ===
- Þorgilsson, Ari; Ellwood, Thomas (1898). The Book of the Settlement of Iceland: Tr. from the Original Icelandic of Ari the Learned. T. Wilson.
- "Landnámabók - Annar hluti". heimskringla.no.
- "Hálfs saga og Hálfsrekka". www.snerpa.is.
- "Þá hló marbendill". www.snerpa.is.
- "Íslenzkar þjóðsögur og æfintýri/Goðfræðisögur/Marbendill, sjódvergur - Wikiheimild". is.wikisource.org (in Icelandic).

=== Secondary ===
- Cochrane, Jamie (2015). "Land-spirits and Iceland's Fantastic Pre-conversion Landscape" (PDF). Sagaconference. Archived from the original (PDF) on 2016-08-18.
- Sävborg, Daniel (2016). "Are the Trolls supernatural?: some Remarks on the Terminology for Strange Beings in Old Norse Literature". AION: Annali: Sezione Germanica: Nuova Serie: XXVI 1/2, 2016 (XXVI): 119–129. doi:10.26379/1118.
- "Old Icelandic Dictionary - Marmennill". Old Icelandic Dictionary.
- "Old Norse Dictionary - Mar-mennill". Cleasby & Vigfusson - Old Norse Dictionary.
