= Historia animalium (Gessner book) =

16th century book by Conrad Gessner

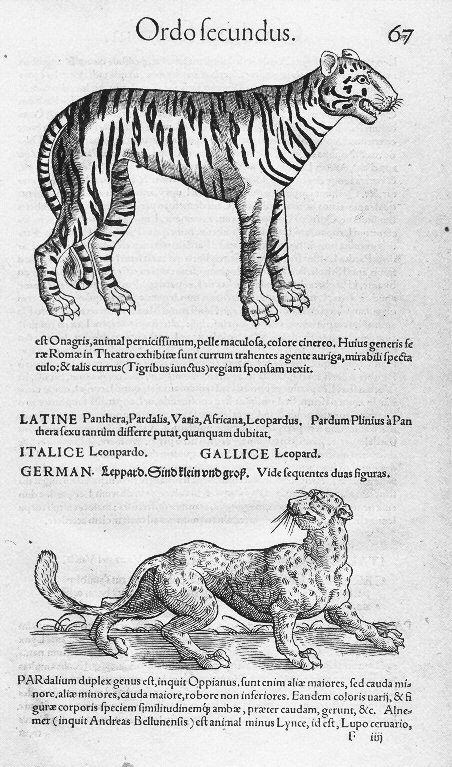
Tiger and leopard, Book 1:Viviparous Quadrupeds

Historia animalium ("History of the Animals"), published in Zurich in 1551–1558 and 1587, is an encyclopedic "inventory of renaissance zoology" by Conrad Gessner (1516–1565). Gessner was a medical doctor and professor at the Carolinum in Zürich, the precursor of the University of Zurich. The Historia animalium, after Aristotle's work of the same name, is the first modern zoological work that attempts to describe all the animals known, and the first bibliography of natural history writings. The five volumes of natural history of animals cover more than 4,500 pages. The animals are presented in alphabetical order, marking the change from Middle Ages encyclopedias, or "mirrors" to a modern view of a consultation work.

== Overview ==
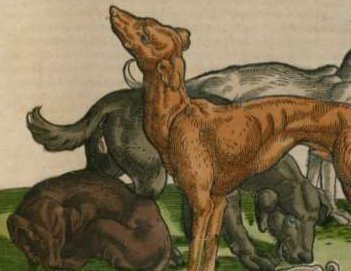
Hunting dogs, Book 1

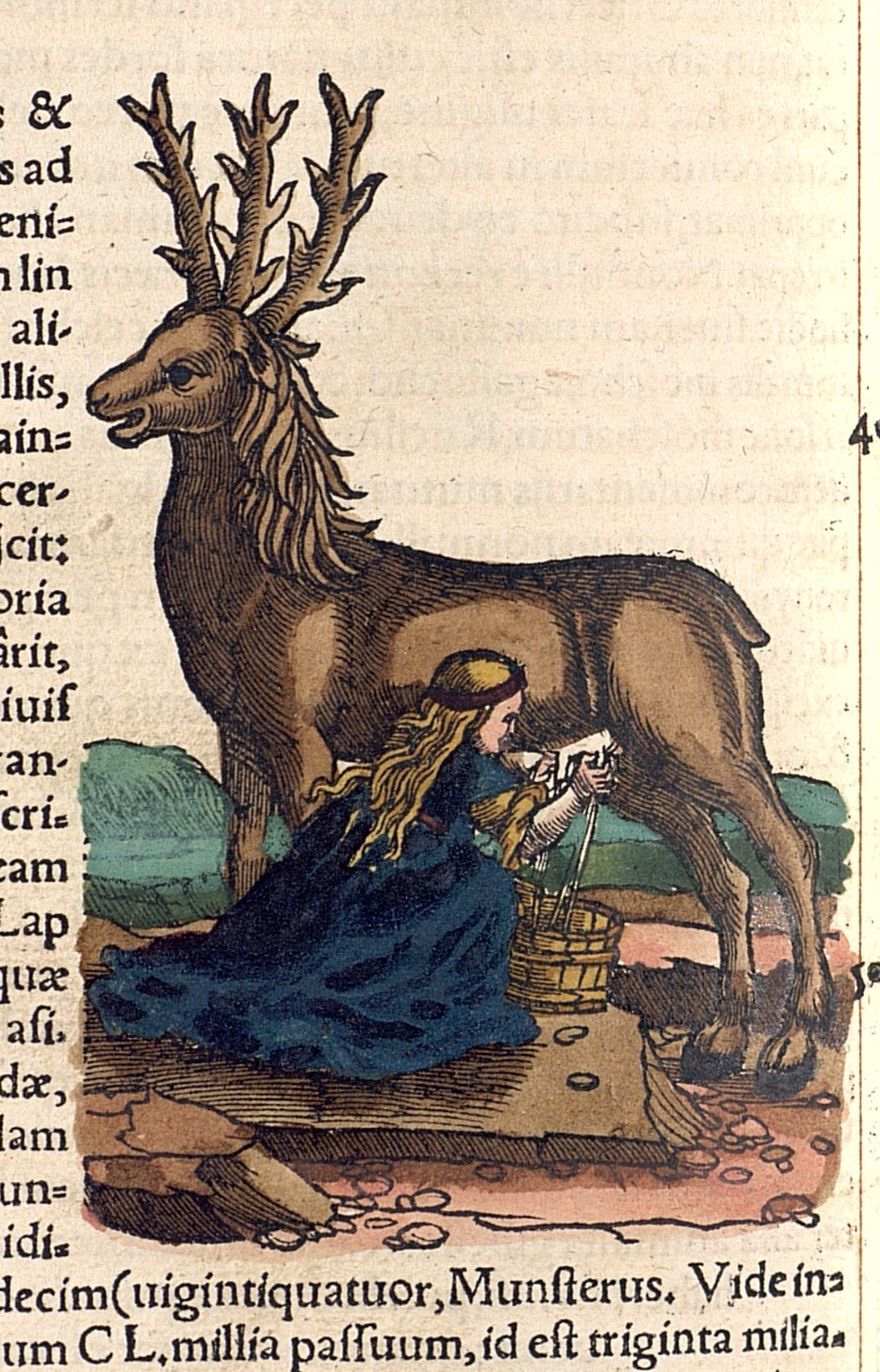
Woodcut of a reindeer (Rangifer) with milking scene, 1551 edition

The Historia animalium was Gessner's magnum opus, and was the most widely read of all the Renaissance natural histories. The generously illustrated work was so popular that Gessner's abridgement, Thierbuch ("Animal Book"), was published in Zurich in 1563, and in England Edward Topsell translated and condensed it as a Historie of foure-footed beastes (London: William Jaggard, 1607). Gessner's monumental work attempts to build a connection between the ancient knowledge of the animal world, its title the same as Aristotle's work on animals, and what was known at his time. He then adds his own observations, and those of his correspondents, in an attempt to formulate a comprehensive description of the natural history of animals.

Gessner's Historia animalium is based on classical sources. It is compiled from ancient and medieval texts, including the inherited knowledge of ancient naturalists like Aristotle, Pliny the Elder, and Aelian. Gessner was known as "the Swiss Pliny." For information he relied heavily on the Physiologus.

In his larger works Gessner sought to distinguish fact from myth and popular misconceptions, and so his encyclopedic work included both extinct creatures and newly discovered animals of the East Indies, those of the far north and animals brought back from the New World. The work included extensive information on mammals, birds, fish, and reptiles. It described in detail their daily habits and movements. It also included their uses in medicine and nutrition.

Historia animalium showed the animals' places in history, literature and art. Sections of each chapter detailed the animal and its attributes, in the tradition of the emblem book. Gessner's work included facts in different languages such as the names of the animals.

== Fantastical creatures ==
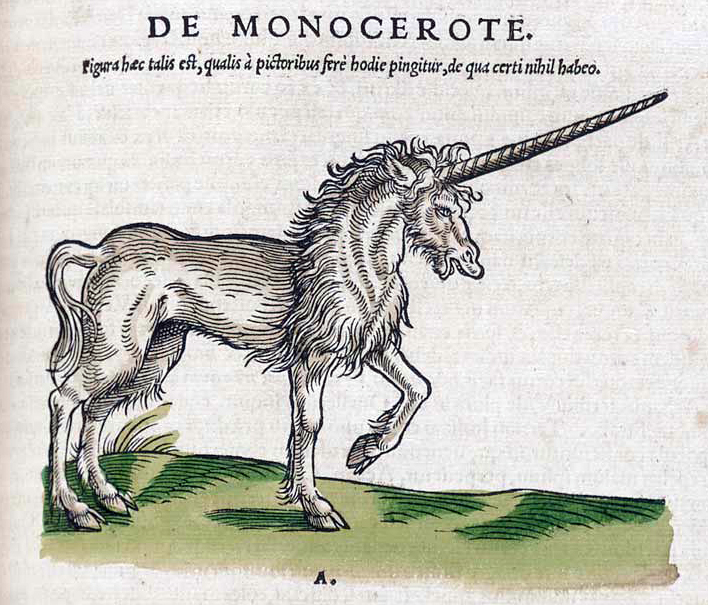
Unicorn

There have been various academic studies relating to Gessner's inclusion of fantastical creatures in the volumes, such as the sea monk, sea bishop, or ichthyocentaur.

Gessner was aware of fakery in the curio shops market, where dried rays were manipulated to look like dragons (for example Jenny Hanivers). There may have also been fake mermaid-like creatures being imported from China by the Dutch.

Also, commercial interests may also have motivated publishers or authors such as Gessner to include such creatures to boost sales. But Gessner was known for meticulously checking facts, and it has been suggested that publishers may have interpolated material when Gessner was in no condition to gainsay them, since the author was already morbidly ill by the time of these publications. In fact there is the example of the Su of Patagonia, posthumously inserted in the 1603 Frankfurt edition.

== Contents ==
- Volume 1: Live-bearing four-footed animals (viviparous quadrupeds) (1551).
- Volume 2: Egg-laying (oviparous) quadrupeds (reptiles and amphibia) (1554).
- Volume 3: Birds (1555).
- Volume 4: Fish and aquatic animals (1558).
- Volume 5: Snakes and scorpions (incomplete, published posthumously 1587).

== Illustrations ==
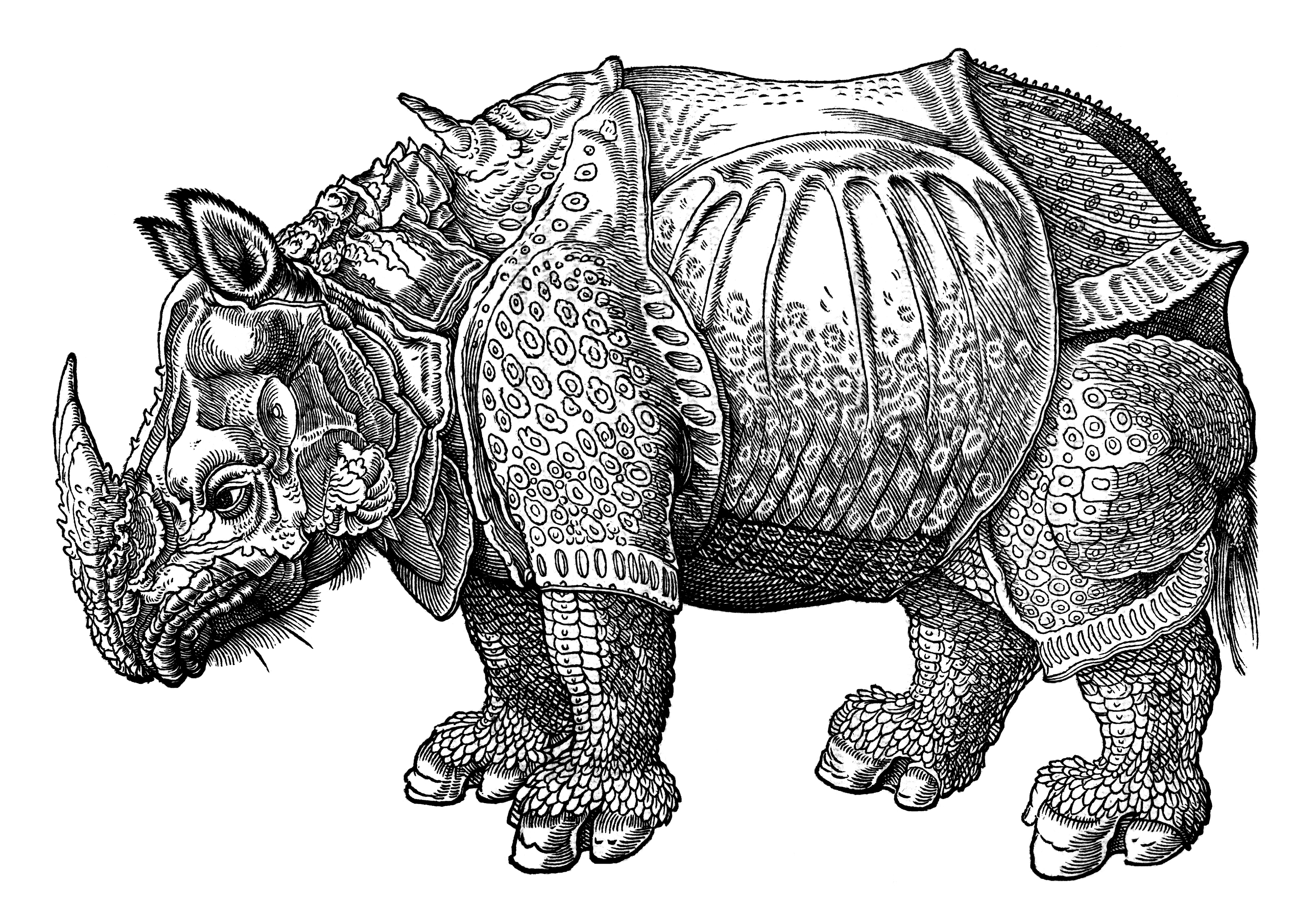
Gessner's copy of Dürer's Rhinoceros

The colored woodcut illustrations were the first real attempts to represent animals in their natural environment. It is the first book to illustrate fossils.

Gessner acknowledges one of his main illustrators was Lucas Schan, an artist from Strasbourg. He likely used other illustrators as well as himself; the book is however famous for copying illustrations from other sources, including Durer's Rhinoceros from a well-known 1515 woodcut. Gessner's natural history was unusual for sixteenth century readers in providing illustrations.

== Censorship ==
There was extreme religious tension at the time Historia animalium came out. Under Pope Paul IV it was felt that the religious convictions of an author contaminated all his writings, and as Gessner was a Protestant, it was added to the Catholic Church's list of prohibited books.

== Bibliography ==
- Gudger, E. W. (1934). "Jenny Hanivers, Dragons and Basilisks in the Old Natural History Books and in Modern Times". The Scientific Monthly. 38 (6): 511–523. JSTOR 15490
- Huxley, Robert; et al. (2007). The Great Naturalists. Thames & Hudson. ISBN 978-0-500-25139-3.
- Schmitt, Charles B.; et al. (1990). The Cambridge History of Renaissance Philosophy. Cambridge University Press. ISBN 0-521-39748-0.
- Pettitt, George A. (18 February 2014). "Conrad Gesner". Encyclopædia Britannica.
