= Nature, Art & Habitat =

Nature, Art & Habitat Residency (NAHR), an ECO-Laboratory of Multidisciplinary Practice, is a non-profit collective dedicated to the organization of a summer residency program in Sottochiesa in the Taleggio Valley (Italy) since 2015, and, from 2021, also in Santa Ynez Valley, California (USA).

== Overview ==
Through their programs, NAHR brings together multidisciplinary scholars, artists, and professionals active in the fields of bio-inspired arts including visual art, dance, poetry and music, design and architecture, as well as anthropology, natural sciences, literature, technology, economy or a cross-disciplinary blend of any of these fields. Participants focus on a common theme of nature each year, and explore four main domains during their residencies: Regenerative Economy, Bio-Inspired Design and Architecture, The Body Performing Nature, and Designed Futures and Technologies. Over the years, NAHR has also curated cultural and artistic events in the Bergamo area. Work produced by NAHR fellows has been exhibited or presented in international art shows and in 2024 NAHR produced an edited book on the topic of eco-centric thinking.

== Ilaria Mazzoleni ==
Ilaria Mazzoleni is an architect and founder of IM Studio Milano/Los Angeles and NAHR. She is known for her work on sustainable architecture at all scales of design, and on biomimicry or design innovation inspired by nature. She has built work in Italy, California, and Ghana.

Her 2013 book "Architecture Follows Nature-Biomimetic Principles for Innovative Design" covers topics such as biomimicry in architecture and site-specific architecture.
