= Bishop-fish =

Mythical sea monster

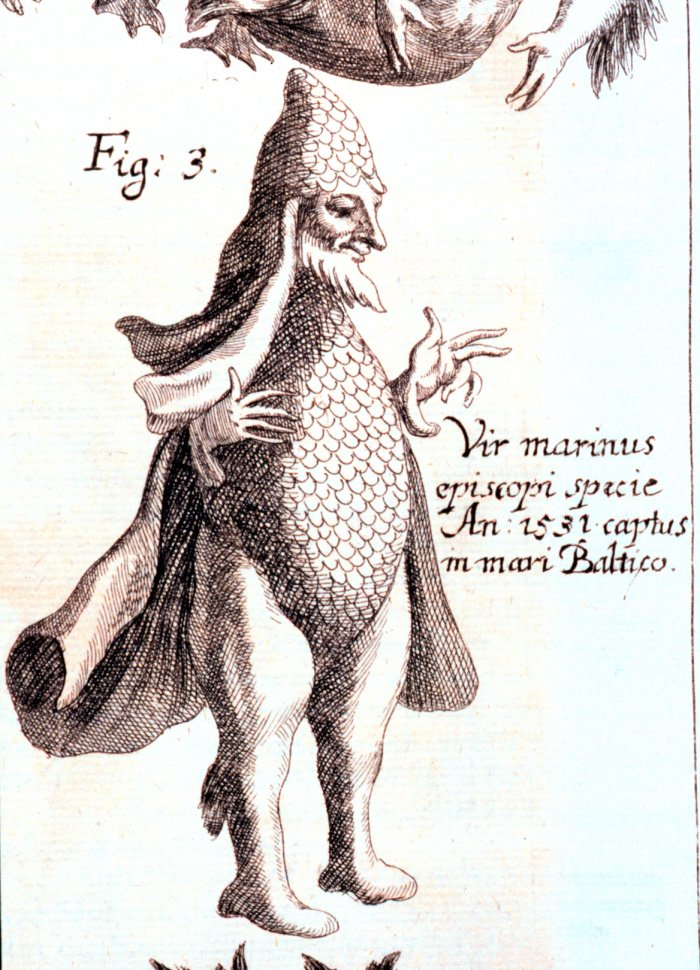
The bishop-fish in Johann Zahn's 1696 work Specula physico-mathematico-historica notabilium ac mirabilium sciendorum

The sea bishop or bishop-fish is a legendary creature first recorded in the 16th century. According to legend, it was taken to the King of Poland, who wished to keep it. It was also shown to a group of Catholic bishops, to whom the bishop-fish gestured, appealing to be released. They granted its wish, at which point it made the sign of the cross and disappeared into the sea.

Another was supposedly captured in the ocean near Germany in 1531. It refused to eat and died after three days. It was described and pictured in the fourth volume of Conrad Gesner's famous Historiae animalium, published in 1551–1558 and 1587.

Cryptozoologist Bernard Heuvelmans believed the report was based on the discovery of a large mutilated Grimaldi scaled squid.

== See also ==
- Oannes (mythology)
- Jenny Haniver
- Sea monk
- Amabie
