= Ceasg =

Scottish mermaid in folklore

The ceasg [kʲʰɛsk] is a mermaid in Scottish folklore with the upper body of a beautiful woman merging with the tail of a grilse (a young salmon). She is also known in Scottish Gaelic as maighdean na tuinne ("maid of the wave") or maighdean mhara ("maid of the sea").

The ceasg lives not only in the sea but also in rivers and streams, and can be made to grant three wishes to anyone who captures her. Marriages sometimes occur between ceasg and humans, and famous maritime pilots are often reputed to be descended from such unions. Even when these marriages end and the ceasg returns to the sea, they will always take an interest in their human descendants, protecting them in storms or guiding them to the best fishing grounds.

The ceasg is sometimes imagined as something more monstrous. In some tales she swallows the hero and he remains alive in her stomach. The hero's wife plays a harp until the mermaid is charmed and the hero escapes. When the wife stops playing the mermaid swallows her, and the hero must consult a wizard for help. He is told that he must obtain a special egg that contains the mermaid's life force. He obtains the egg, rescues his wife, and kills the mermaid by crushing the egg. In these stories the hero had been promised to the mermaid before his birth. His father had been childless and the mermaid promised him sons on condition that the firstborn would be given to her. The Scottish folklorist Donald MacKenzie suggested that the ceasg may originally have been a sea goddess to whom human beings were sacrificed.
