= Sea monk =

Reported sea creature found in Denmark

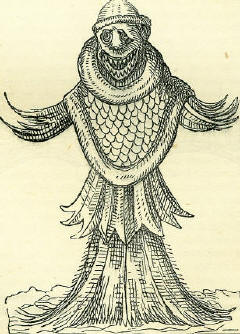
Illustration from Omnium fere gentium nostrae que aetatis nationum, habitus et effigies, et in eosdem epigrammata by Johannes Sluperius, 1572

The sea monk (also monk-fish or monkfish) was a sea creature found off the eastern coast of the Danish island of Zealand in 1546. It was described as a "fish" that outwardly resembled a human monk in his habit.

== Names ==
The creature was called "monk fish" (Latin: piscis monachus) by Belon (1553), and piscis monachi habitu ("fish [wearing] the habit of a monk") by Rondelet (1554).

The name "sea monk" (monachus maris) was applied to it by Gesner (1558), and Joannes Sluperius (1572; Latin: monachus marinus; French: moyne marin) as well.

== History ==
The alleged sea monk was captured at sea between Denmark's Zealand and Sweden, in the strait Øresund, probably in 1546. Christian III of Denmark sent an illustration of it to Charles V, Holy Roman Emperor. The creature is recorded in Vedel's Den danske Krønicke (1575) as measuring 4 ells long (15 ft; 4.6 m). It was either caught in a herring net, or stranded, depending on the source.

=== 16th-century natural history ===
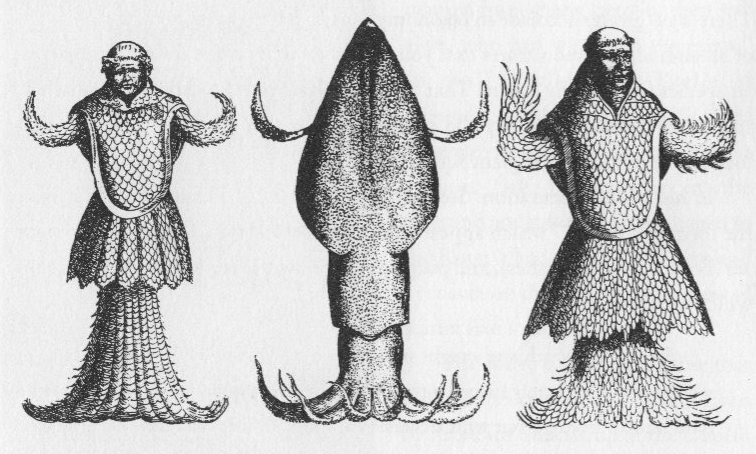
Steenstrup's comparison of a squid with sea monks from the sixteenth century: (left) Rondelet's sea monk; (center) Loligo squid; (right) Belon's sea monk. (Note: These are approximate facsimiles of Rondelet and Belon, and not exact copies.)

The capture of the sea monk is dated to either 1546 or 1549 in 16th-century literature, or to both dates, in the case of Lycosthenes (1557), who states both captures occurred near Copenhagen, Denmark. (Note: Actually three of them, in 1530, 1546, and 1549, but the first of these was found on the Rhine, and "not a sea monk at all" (Paxton & Holland).) There is also a German woodcut by Stefan Hamer possibly dating to 1546, illustrating the sea-monk caught in Copenhagen in 1546.

The sea monk was listed in several illustrated natural history books published in the mid-16th century, such as Pierre Belon (1553), Guillaume Rondelet (1554), and Conrad Gesner (1558). It was described as a "fish" that looked superficially like a monk.

Belon (1553) gave a briefer notice on piscis monachus (monk-fish) in his Latin volume, a more expanded account appearing later in his French version of 1555.

Rondelet (1554) called it "the fish with the habit of a monk (piscis monachi habitu), and classed it as a merman (homo maris). But he did not think the pictorial representations he obtained could be taken at face value, and suspected they were embellished "by the painter to make the thing seem more marvelous". What prompted his suspicions of artistic license seems to be his discovery of other portrayals of the monkfish, quite different from his own, obtained by his rival and friend Gesner and others in Rome.

Rondelet stated that a drawing of it from life (or corpse) was made by an artist in the presence of a certain gentleman, who gave a copy to Charles V, and another copy to Marguerite, Queen of Navarre, the latter of which was provided to Rondelet. The picture being the gift of Marguerite, a great patron of the sciences, meant it was not something to be readily dismissed, but rather authenticated, by Marguerite, treated as an authority on par with Pliny.

Rondelet's information was imperfect in other ways: he stated the creature had been taken in "Norway [sic.] at Diezum near the town called Denelopoch", but this was a garbling of Die Sund ("the Sound" of Øresund) off of Ellenbogen (Malmö, Sweden). The information was conveyed through some intermediary German source. (Note: Belon also stated the location as "Diezunt" near "Den Elopoch".)

Belon (1555) in his French edition about the monk-fish also classed the monk-fish as a merman (French: homme marin), and garnished his commentary with mention of merfolk from ancient writings, specifically sirens, tritons, naiads, and nereids. Belon, according to Steenstrup's assessment, had faith in the existence of this sea monk without ever having seen one. Belon attributed these curiosities to "playfulness of Nature".

The fourth volume of Conrad Gesner's famous Historia Animalium described it, and although much of Gesner's piece was derivative or even copied wholesale from his predecessors, Belon and Rondelet, he appended a collolarium section containing his own findings and observations. As to the creature that measured 4 cubits, Gesner added that it had a black face like an Ethiopian, according to a German rhyme. Gesner here quoted Albertus Magnus's account of the monachus maris. He also mentioned a similar monster found in the Firth of Forth, citing Scottish historian Hector Boethius (Hector Boece). Gesner had two other sources to draw from, namely Georg Fabricius and Hector Mythobius.

The aforementioned Lycosthenes in Prodigiorum ac Ostentorum Chronicon [Of Portents and Shown Times] (1557) described the 1546 sea monk as having a black head, and gave an illustration of it as such.

=== Literary works ===
The sea monk was subsequently popularised in Guillaume du Bartas's epic poem La Sepmaine; ou, Creation du monde, where the poet speaks of correspondences between land and sea, mentioning both the "mytred Bishop" and the "cowled Fryer":

"Seas have (as well as skies) Sun, Moon, and Stars;
(As well as ayre) Swallows, and Rooks, and Stares;
(As well as earth) Vines, Roses, Nettles, Millions,
Pinks, Gilliflowers, Mushrooms, and many millions
of other Plants lants (more rare and strange than these)
As very fishes living in the Seas.
And also Rams, Calfs, Horses, Hares, and Hogs,
Wolves, Lions, Urchins, Elephants and Dogs,
Yea, Men and Mayds; and (which I more admire)
The mytred Bishop and the cowled Fryer;
Whereof, examples, (but a few years since)
Were shew'n the Norways, and Polonian Prince."

== Explanations ==
In the early 1850s, Danish zoologist Japetus Steenstrup suggested that the sea-monk was a giant squid, a theory more recently popularised by writer Richard Ellis. Cryptozoologist Bernard Heuvelmans believed the report was based on a walrus.

More recently, it has been suggested that it was an angelshark, Squatina squatina, which is commonly called "monkfish" in English or munk in Norwegian and Danish. Other suspected identities of the sea monk include the grey seal, the hooded seal, the monk seal, or a hoax such as a Jenny Haniver.

== See also ==
- Amabie
- Bishop-fish
- Dagon
- Jenny Haniver
- Umibōzu
