= Fiji mermaid =

Fake mummified body of a half-monkey half-fish

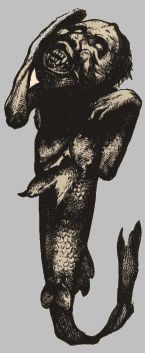
P. T. Barnum's Feejee mermaid from 1842

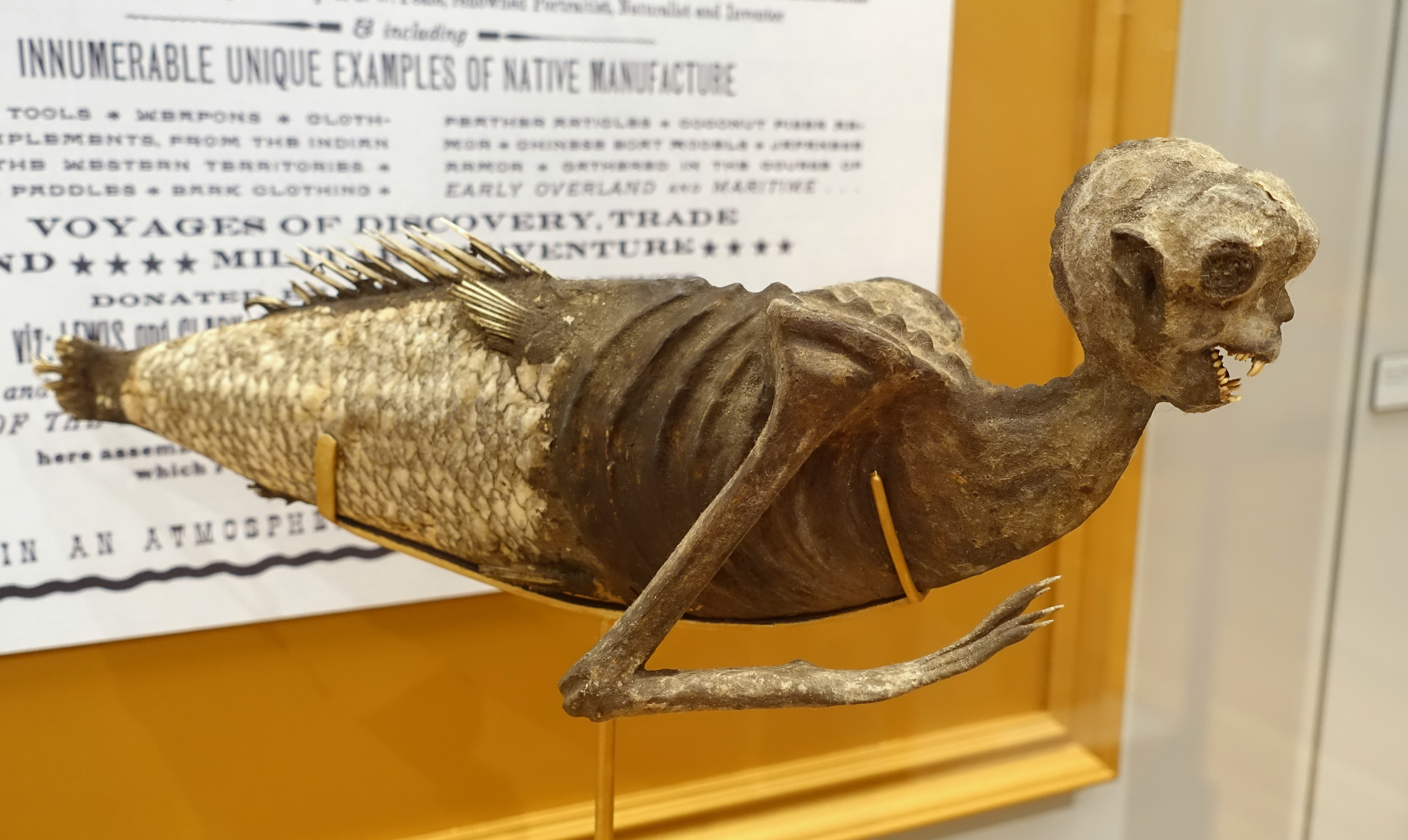
Another "mermaid", made of papier-mâché, from the same collection of Moses Kimball —Harvard University's Peabody Museum of Archaeology and Ethnology

The Fiji mermaid (also Feejee mermaid) was an object composed of the torso and head of a juvenile monkey sewn to the back half of a fish. It was a common feature of sideshows where it was presented as the mummified body of a creature that was supposedly half mammal and half fish, a version of a mermaid. The original had fish scales with animal hair superimposed on its body and pendulous breasts on its chest. The mouth was wide open with its teeth bared. The right hand was against the right cheek, and the left tucked under its lower left jaw. This mermaid was supposedly caught near the Fiji Islands in the South Pacific. Several replicas and variations have also been made and exhibited under similar names and pretexts. P. T. Barnum exhibited the original in Barnum's American Museum in New York in 1842, but it then disappeared—likely consumed in one of the many fires that destroyed parts of Barnum's collections.

== History ==
Barnum, in his autobiography, described the mermaid as "an ugly, dried-up, black-looking, diminutive specimen, about 3 feet long. Its mouth was open, its tail turned over, and its arms thrown up, giving it the appearance of having died in great agony," a significant departure from traditional depictions of mermaids as attractive creatures.

American sea captain Samuel Barrett Edes bought Barnum's "mermaid" from Japanese sailors in 1822 for $6,000, using money from the ship's expense account. Another account says that a captain of an American whaler bought it for $5,000 in Batavia, the Dutch East Indies.

Either way, the mermaid is believed to be one of many being manufactured commercially in Japan, by fishermen with a sense of humor as well as profit-mindedness. It was possibly a composite of a "blue-faced monkey and a salmon" in this case.

A Dutchman who was posted as warehouse keeper on Dejima, Nagasaki 1820–1829 writes that such a mermaid could be obtained for a handy price and resold for a fortune in Dutch Indonesia. According to J. F. van Overmeer Fisscher, the object from the Japanese workshop merely cost 30 ryō (Note: Dutch: theilen, or tael, which stands for Chinese liang (兩), or Japanese ryō (両). It is verified 1 ryō was exchange for 2 Dutch Guldens.) or 60 guilders, but might be sold for 2000 Spanish dollars in Batavia. When he showed interest in this speculative profiteering, all sorts of samples were shown him: a two-headed men, face-on-belly, devil-headed people, twin-headed dragons, etc., some of which wound up as part of his cabinet collection in The Hague.

The mermaid was displayed in London in 1822, advertised in a publication by J. Limbird in the Mirror, and displayed the Turf Coffee-house, St. James's Street. An etching of it was made by artist George Cruikshank in 1822.

Captain Edes' son took possession of the mermaid and sold it to Moses Kimball of the Boston Museum in 1842, and he brought it to New York City that summer to show it to P. T. Barnum. Barnum had a naturalist examine it who would not attest to its authenticity. Nevertheless, Barnum believed that the relic would draw the public to the museum. Kimball remained the creature's sole owner, while Barnum leased it for $12.50 a week. Barnum generated publicity for the object by having an agent send anonymous letters to New York newspapers from Montgomery, Alabama, and Charleston, South Carolina, contending that "Dr. J. Griffin" had an object which he had caught in South America. Griffin was actually being impersonated by Levi Lyman, one of Barnum's associates. To keep the plan working, Griffin checked in to a Philadelphia hotel, then showed the mermaid to the landlord as a thanks for his hospitality. The landlord was so intrigued that he begged Griffin to show it to some of his friends, many of whom were editors.

Griffin traveled to New York and displayed it to a small audience, then displayed it as the Fiji Mermaid in the concert hall for a week. It was actually only displayed for five days because Barnum had "convinced" Griffin to bring it to the American Museum of Natural History. Barnum printed 10,000 pamphlets which described general information about mermaids and stories about his specimen in particular.

== Later incarnations ==
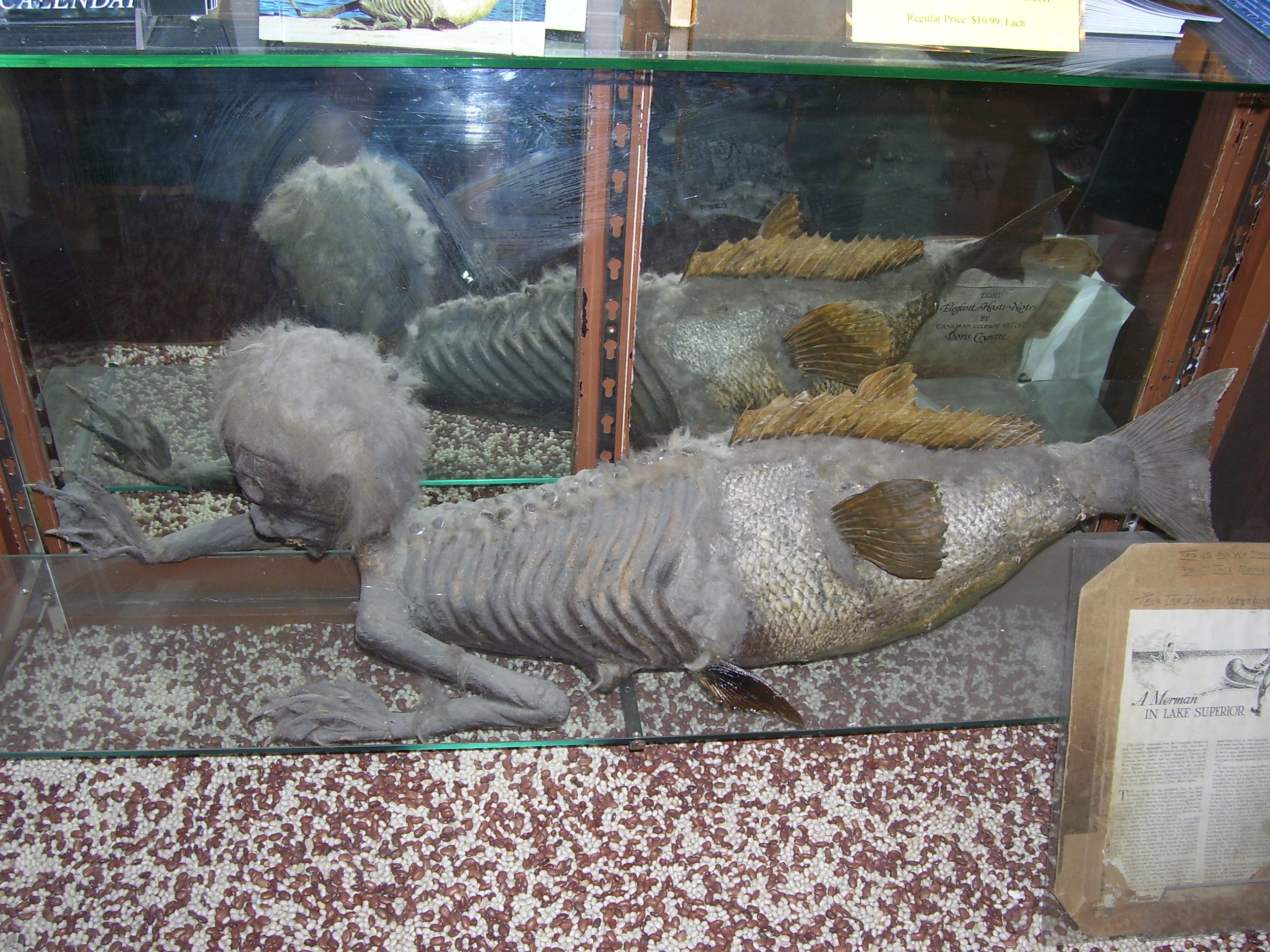
The Banff Merman, similar to a Fiji mermaid, on display at the Indian Trading Post

In his Secrets of the Sideshows, Joe Nickell documents several modern-day claimants to the title of Barnum's "true" original mermaid, or as he describes them, "fakes of Barnum's fake". Exhibits at Ripley's Believe It or Not!, Coney Island's Sideshow by the Seashore, and Bobby Reynolds' traveling sideshow all lay claim to the title, but according to Nickell's opinion, none of them are to be believed. He also describes an update of the tradition that uses an elaborate system to project the image of a live woman into a fishbowl, giving the appearance that she is only an inch or two long. He relates the story of a performer who was smoking a cigarette in her hidden chamber; the man outside was confronted by an angry patron who demanded to know how this was possible if the "mermaid" was underwater.

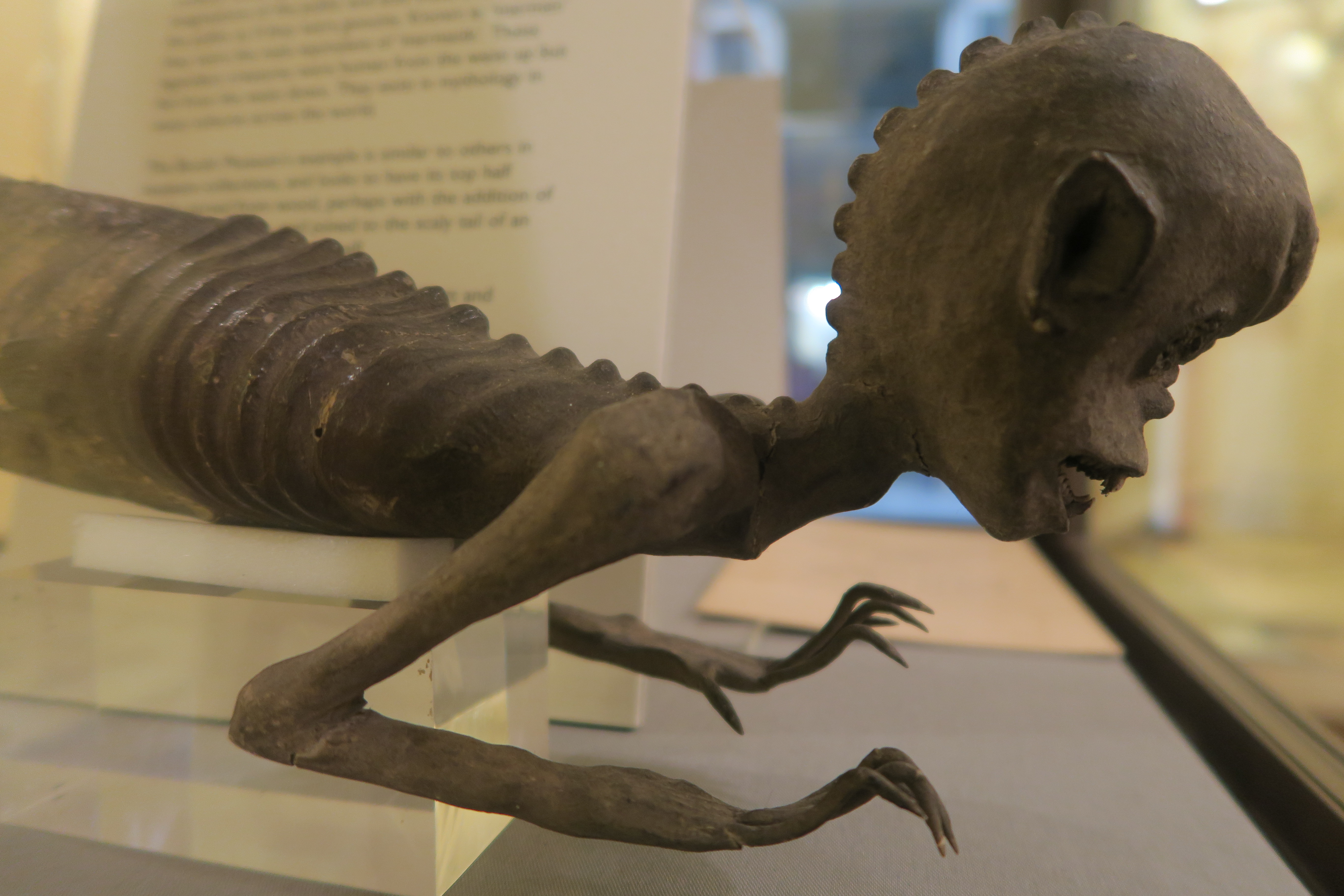
A merman constructed out of wood carving, and parts of monkey and fish, Booth Museum, Brighton

A guide to constructing a Fiji mermaid appeared in the October 2009 issue of Fortean Times magazine, in an article written by special effects expert and stop-motion animator Alan Friswell. Rather than building the figure with fish and monkey parts, Friswell used papier mache and modelling putty, sealed with wallpaper paste, and with doll's hair glued to the scalp.

== See also ==
- Amabie
- Jenny Haniver
- Ningyo
