= Jenny Haniver =

Modified fish carcass to resemble fictional creature

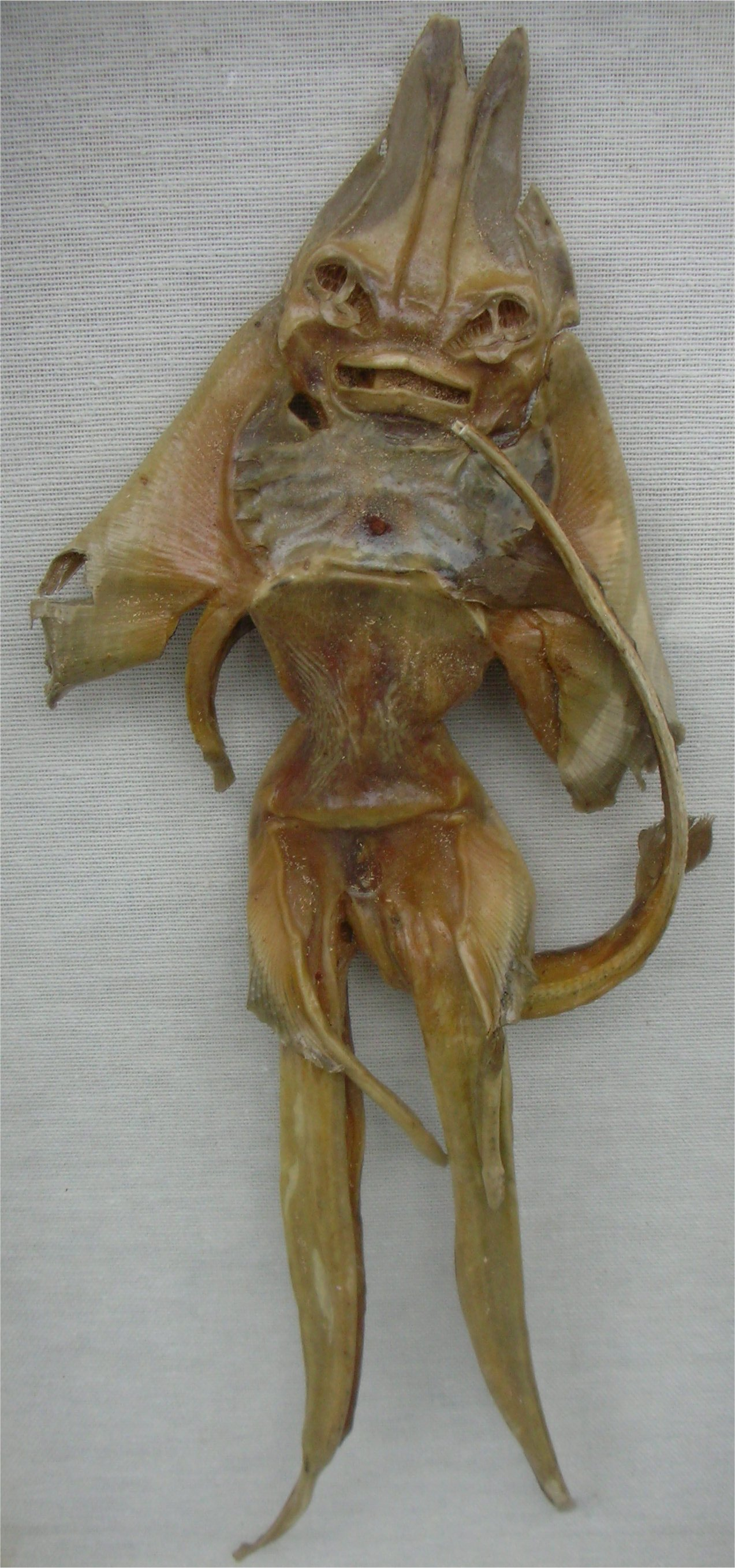
Jenny Haniver

A Jenny Haniver is the carcass of a ray or a skate that has been modified by hand then dried, resulting in a mummified specimen intended to resemble a fanciful fictional creature, such as a demon or dragon. This practice dates back to the 16th century when these specimens were often sold as curiosities to sailors and collectors.

== Name ==
One suggestion for the origin of the term was the French phrase jeune d'Anvers ("youth of Antwerp"). British sailors "cockneyed" this description into the personal name "Jenny Haniver".

== History ==
Jenny Hanivers have been created to look like various mythical creatures, including devils, angels and dragons. Some writers have suggested the sea monk may have been a Jenny Haniver.

The earliest known picture of Jenny Haniver appeared in Konrad Gesner's Historia Animalium vol. IV in 1558. Gesner warned that these were merely disfigured rays and should not be believed to be miniature dragons or monsters, which was a popular misconception at the time.

The most common misconception was that Jenny Hanivers were basilisks. As basilisks were creatures that killed with merely a glance, no one could claim to know what one looks like. For this reason it was easy to pass off Jenny Hanivers as these creatures, which were still widely feared in the 16th century.

In Veracruz, Mexico, Jenny Hanivers are considered to have magical powers and are employed by curanderos in their rituals. This tradition is similar to one in Japan, where fake taxidermy ningyo (similar to Fiji mermaids) were produced and kept in temples.

== Gallery ==
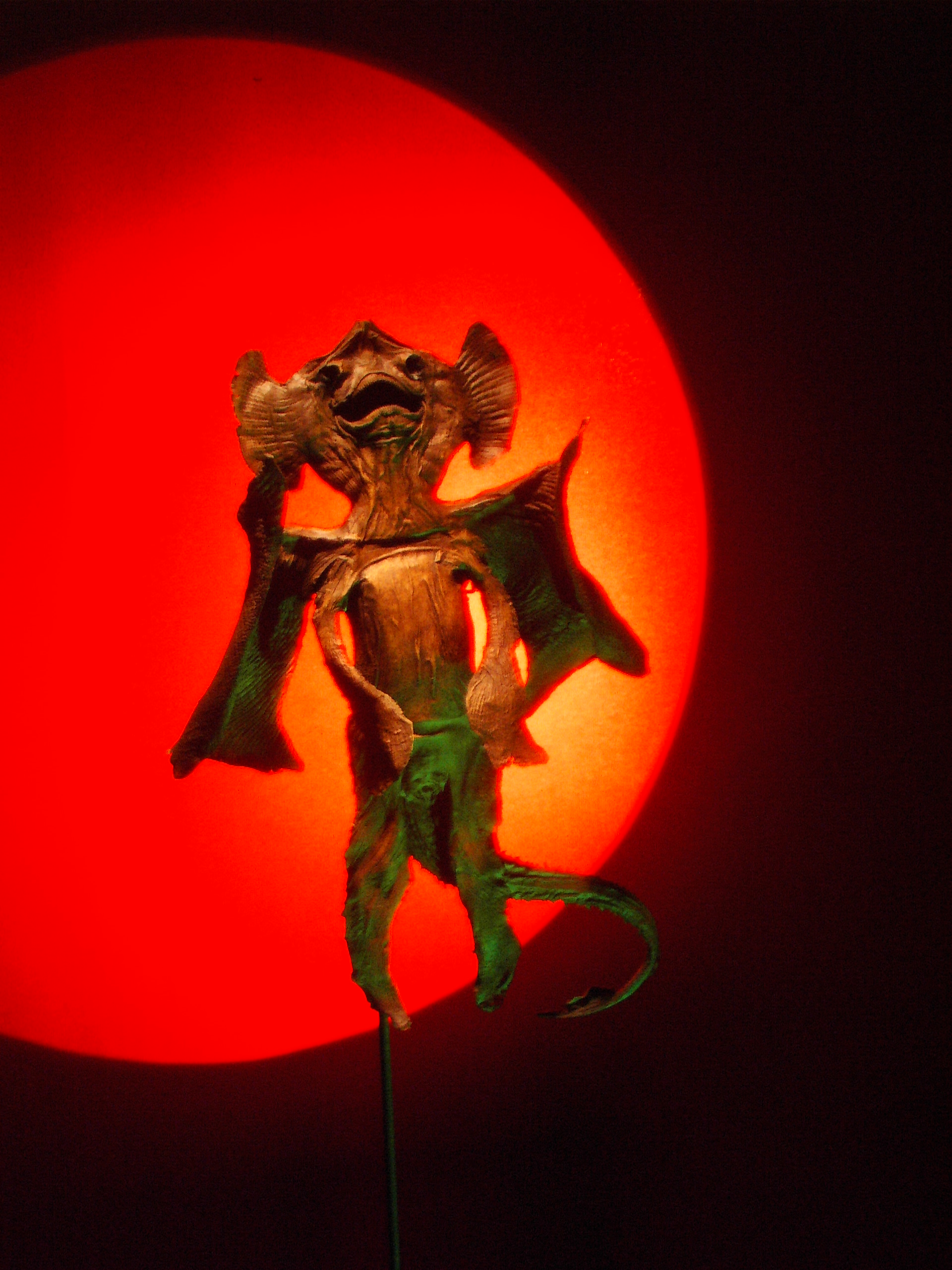

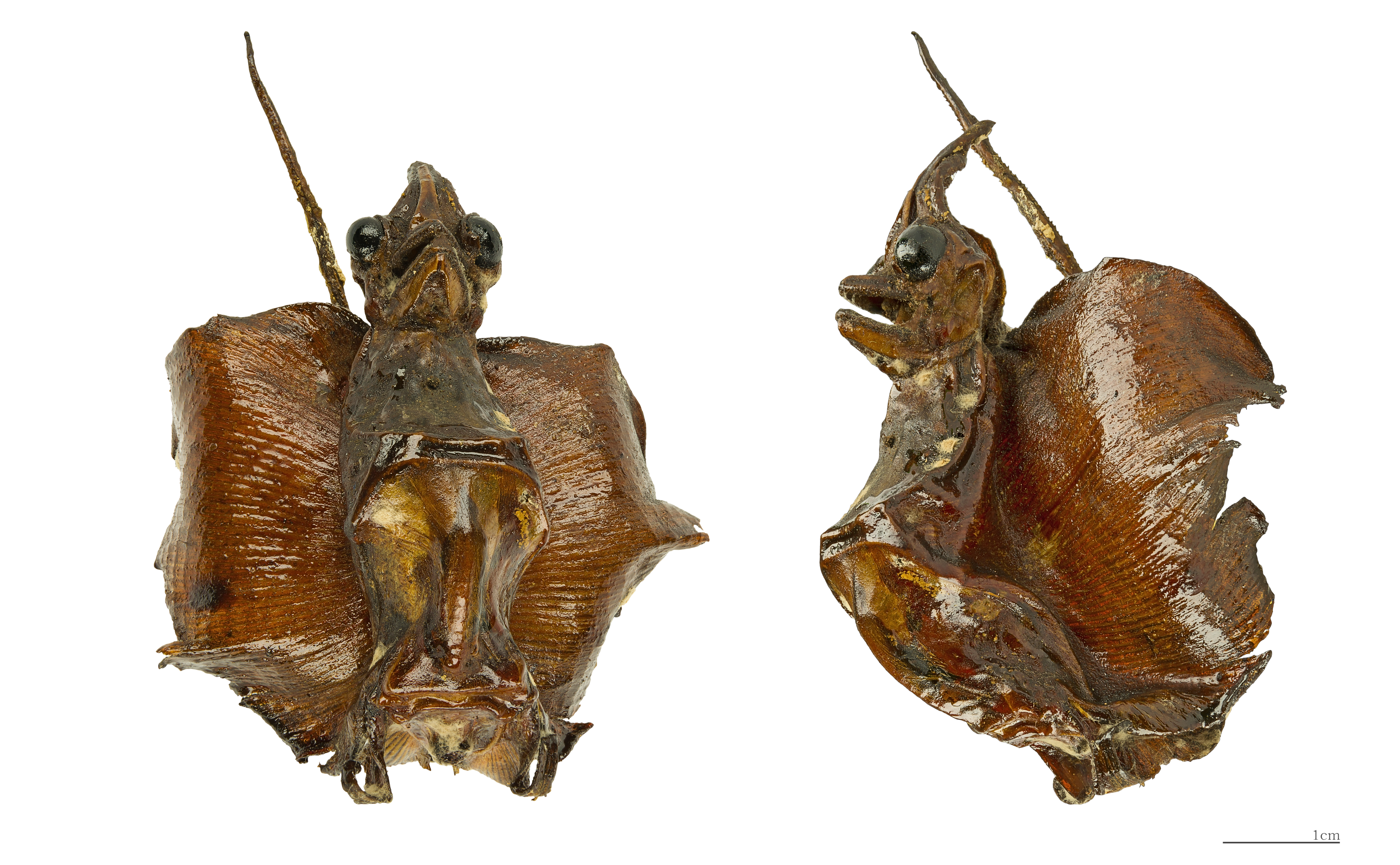

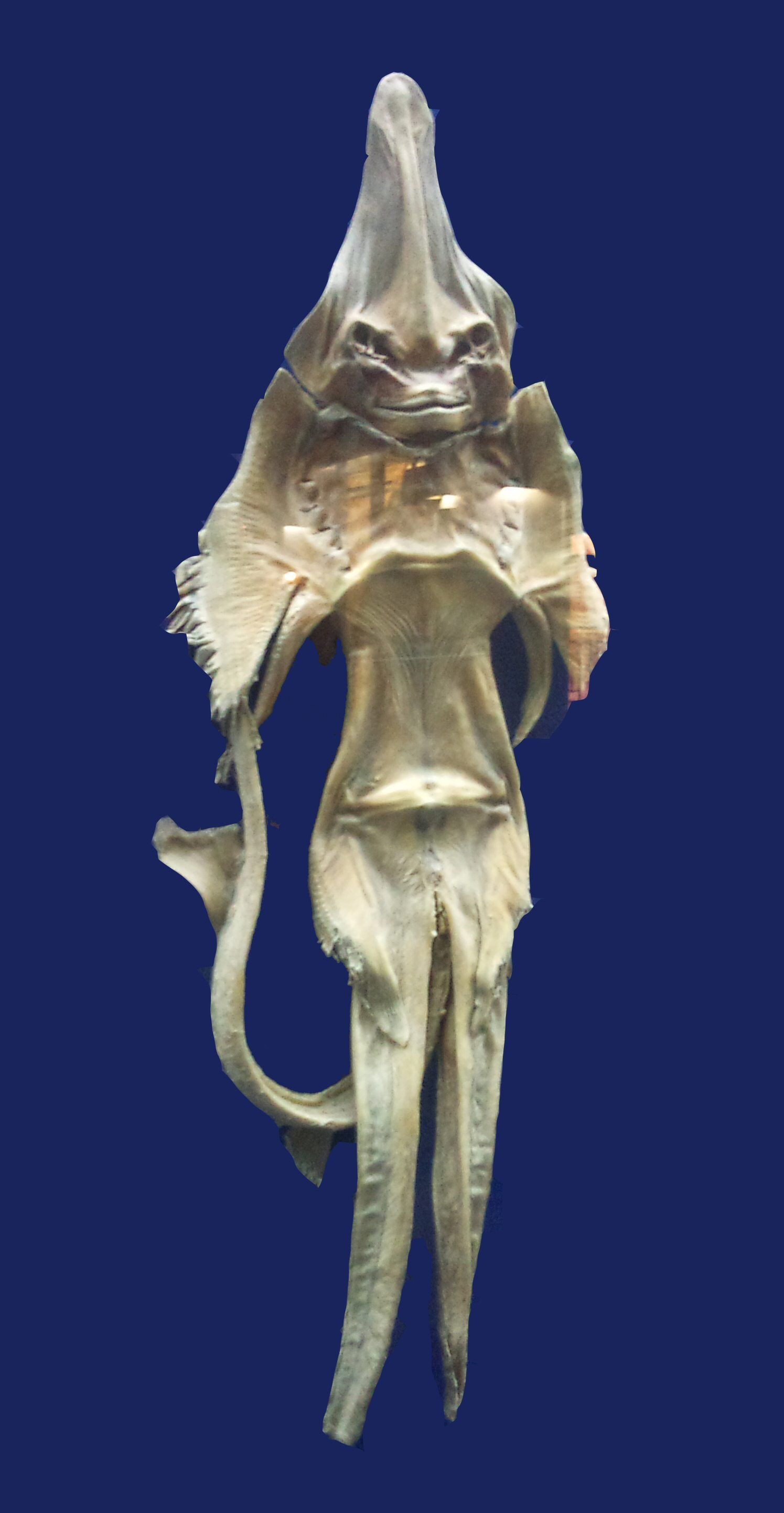

== In popular culture ==
- The Jenny Haniver and Jenny Haniver II are airships in the Mortal Engines Quartet (2001–2006) series of novels by Philip Reeve, and a boat in one of its prequels, A Web of Air (2010).
- The Bermuda Depths, a 1978 fantasy film starring Leigh McCloskey and Connie Sellecca, featured the latter as a mysterious character named "Jennie Haniver".
- In the 2022 video game Splatoon 3, a Jenny Haniver is available as a purchasable locker decoration under the name “mysterious dried thing”.
- In the table-top role-playing game Pathfinder, a haniver is a type of malevolent gremlin similar to a manta ray.
- In the 2024 RPGMaker game Clinical Trial, the character Lee Smith has a Jenny Haniver on display in his home.
- In the collection of short stories entitled, “The End of the World as We Know It: New Tales of Stephen King’s ‘The Stand,’“ Jenny Hanivers are mentioned or discussed several times in Poppy Z Brite’s story, “Till Human Voices Wake Us, and We Drown.”
- 'Jenny and the Hanivers' are an alternative rock and folk band based in Sydney's Inner West, fronted by multi-instrumentalist Zoe Conolan-Glen. The group is known for queer and trans community performances, (famously featuring Zoe as a "singing JP" who can sign legal name and gender change documents at their shows).

== See also ==
- Amabie
- Fiji mermaid
- Ningyo
