= Hairen =

Chinese folktale creature

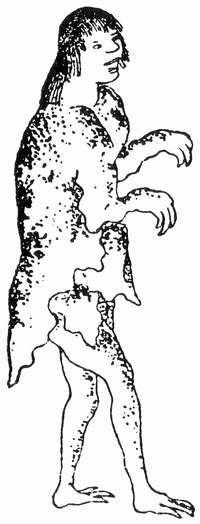
A kaijin or "sea-human" ― Hirokawa Kai, Nagasaki bunkenroku.

A hairen (海人, "sea-human") is a sea-dwelling human or humanoid in Chinese lore, also called kaijin (海人) by Japanese sources.

According to a Chinese texts which were actually authored by Europeans, the hairen was human-like overall but possessed webbed feet and hands, and one was captured in Holland, who had loose drooping skin on her whole body, almost like she wore a piece of garment (specifically a paofu or long robe). This refers to the "marine woman" captured in 1403 (Mermaid of Edam) recorded in various sources, (Note: Japanese scholar Mozume Takami (1922)noted the Dutch woman found in Purmer Lake was the same as hairen described in the Kunyu waiji. Arianna Magnani's 2022 paper observed the hairen in Zhifang waiji referred to the 1403 event (marine woman found in a lake in Holland).) though Dutch sources said she was covered with some aquatic substance (later assumed to be sea moss or seaweed).

The account of the "sea-humans" also recurred in Japanese sources dating to the Edo Period, such as Kaibara Ekken's Yamato honzō, which describe the creature as having skin that hangs down to the ground, like a pair of hakama trousers being worn.

== China ==
=== Ming and Qing dynasties ===
Books written by Europeans and published in the Chinese language during the Ming and Qing dynasties mention the hairen. Italian Jesuit Giulio Aleni (Chinese name: Airulüe 艾儒略) wrote in his Zhifang waiji (simplified Chinese: 职方外纪; traditional Chinese: 職方外紀, "Records of Regions beyond the Jurisdiction of the Imperial Geographer", 1623) that there are two types of hairen. (Note: Zhifang waiji, juan 5, "General Theory of the Four Seas 四海総説", section on "Marine folk 海族".) Flemish Jesuit Ferdinand Verbiest (Nan Huairen 南懐仁) wrote a closely similar description in his Kunyu waiji (simplified Chinese: 坤舆外纪; traditional Chinese: 坤輿外紀, "Records of the Foreign World", c. 1670).

The first type was overall human-like, with both beards and eyebrows, (Note: Chinese: 須眉/鬚眉) but having hands and feet which were webbed, like those of wild ducks. (Note: Chinese: 鳧.) An individual was captured in the Western (European) sea, and presented to a certain king, but ate nothing, and having failed to tame it, the king was forced to release it back to sea, and the liberated creature clapped its hands and laughed loudly.

The second type was exemplified by the (female) individual captured 200 years before (i.e., 15th century): "her entire body was covered with a drooping skin [which touched the ground], as if she were dressed in a non-removable cloth [a paofu 袍服 or traditional Chinese long robe] rather than [being] naked". She was clothed and fed, and lived for a number of years and worked for a living (i.e., spinning yarn (Note: According to Western sources (in Latin), assuming she was the Mermaid of Edam, as will be discussed momentarily. Magnani's paper quoting Petrus renders Latin nere as "knit", but Petrus's history in Dutch reads "leerde sy spinnen" so she "learned to spin", and other sources also agree she became known for her spinning.)). She would bow respectfully before a crucifix, but did not gain ability to speak.

This female hairen has been determined to be the one captured in Holland in 1403 (the so-called Mermaid of Edam), described in a number of 17th century European works. For example, this "marine woman" (Latin: mulier quaedam marina) or "siren" was caught in 1403 by fishermen, having been cast into the sea by storm according to Petrus Scriverius (d. 1660)'s Respublica Hollandiae, et urbes ("The Commonwealth and Towns of Holland"). While Petrus's Latin text stated she was "found naked and dumb", his work written in Dutch states she was found "covered in green moss" (Dutch: met groen mosch bewassen) (Note: Petrus's history in Dutch sources Hadrianus Junius's Batavia (1588), which is quoted in Latin and also states "covered in green moss" (Latin: viridis mosca turpe).) in the Purmer Lake or IJe (river) of Edam. (Note: Text gives "Purmerye", where Ye is old variant of IJe.)

An older work (1470) stated more vaguely that some "watery substance clung to her", (Note: Johannes a Leydis (1470). "waterachtige stoste, die haar aankleefde".) A later chronicler (1517) added layers of detail, so that she was represented as a wild woman who "covered with watery material such as moss and other slime". (Note: Cornelius Aurelius (1517), Die cronycke van Hollandt, Zeelandt ende Vrieslant. As paraphrased by Peacock (2020), p. 686. The original Dutch reads: "..als mosch, sliver ende ander slijm, al ruych bewassen;") Generally it is explained that she was covered in green seaweed but it got washed off.

The element of this mermaid venerating the crucifix is always mentioned by European sources, but omitted by Chinese sources such as Nie Huang (聂璜)'s Haicuotu (海錯圖, "Book of Strange Ocean Creatures"). The illustrated creature here is designated a hairenyu (海人魚, "marine human-fish") but also equated with the hairen of the aforementioned source, Zhifang waiji.

=== Song dynasty ===
Shaozi (邵子) aka Shao Yong (邵雍) during the Song dynasty is cited as source for the account of the hairen found in the Caomuzi (zh:草木子) and other second-hand sources. (Note: Guanchao pian Shaozi [?] or Kanshō hen Shōshi (観抄篇邵子) is also cited, possibly an abridged edition.) The author observes that "whatever lives on land, there necessarily exists [its counterpart] in water", and therefore "sea-humans" must exist. He had heard from sea merchants that the South Sea (South China Sea?) is known for appearances of hairen, which "have the shape of a monk, a human quite small". When it boards the ship, the crew must be strictly instructed to remain silent and wait for it to leave and dive back into water. If this is not obeyed, a show of rowdiness will invite a great wind, and the ship is sure to be capsized. (Note: Banbutsu yawa (万物夜話), vol. 2, page 14. Same text, from an undisclosed source, is given here in a translated form (yomikudashi or kanbun kundoku).)

The hairen described by Shaozi has been equated with the umibōzu ("sea-priest") (Note: Japanese: "海人（カイジン）..俗にいふ海坊子（ウミバウズ）なり".) or with the umikozō ("sea acolyte priest"). This is just another local variant name for umibōzu.

=== Jurchen Jin dynasty ===
A second example of a manikin appearing from the sea (Note: Yamaguchi quotes the two examples from the Caomuzi, prefacing that "of the humans appearing out of the sea, they are said to be small in form[stature] 海から現れる人としてその形容は小さいとしている".) (or mere (Note: The body of water in the second example, Tangluo actually referred to lakes in Hebei. Yamaguchi apparently includes it as umi (sea), but this is somewhat justifiable in Japanese (Lake Biwa was originally known as Ōmi/Afumi (淡海)).)) is given by the Caomuzi.

During a later period when the Song dynasty wa replaced by the Great Jin, a dragon in its capital city Yanjing (燕京, today's Beijing) from the old lake system known as Tangluo (塘濼), and in its foreclaws held a young child. The child was formally dressed in "red robe and jade belt (hongpao yudai; 紅袍玉帯) as if he were a zhongguan (中官). It disappeared back into water after three shi (6 hour[?])'s time.

=== Dressed merfolk ===
Whereas the hairen described by the Jesuits had dangling folds of skin resembling a pao or paofu (袍服) robe-attire, the child held by the dragon in the Jing dynasty account supposedly wore a scarlet pao robe.

Another anecdote which may be related to hairen (Note: The Banbutsu yawa, by a Confucian physician of the Edo Period, provides account of the hairen (as according to Caomuzi), immediately followed by this account of the lady from the sea, though this Japanese work does not name its Chinese sources.) was the account of the female witnessed by an emissary named Zha Dao (査道) dispatched to Korea (cf. Mermaid§Chinese folklore, hairenyu). She is said to have worn a scarlet skirt (chang, 裳) and grew a scarlet mane. Zha Dao identified this lady as a renyu ("human-fish"). The episode is attributable to the Chinese source Cuyiji ("Records of Bygone Extraordinay Things").

== Japan ==
The creature's name pronounced hairen (海人, "sea-human") in Chinese is read as kaijin in Japanese. (Note: Japanese: "カイジン"; "かい志゛ん".)

According to Kaibara Ekken's Yamato honzō (1709), the kaijin closely resembles a human in appearance, with a head of hair, eyebrows, and beards, and webbing between the toes and fingers of its four limbs. It never ate food or drink provided by humans, and did not speak any human-like language. And "one type had, all over the body, [folds of] fleshy skin, which drooped from around the waist, like hakama [trousers]". But once brought out of the sea, it could only live on land for a few days. (Note: Kaibara Ekken. Yamato honzō, furoku-kan-no-2 [supplementary volume 2]. "kaijin 海人".。)。

The Nagasaki kenbunroku (aka Nagasaki bunkenroku, published Kansei 12/1800) also contains a similar description. (Note: "全身に肉皮（にくひ）ありて、下に垂るること、袴に似たる...", i.e., "has fleshy skin all over the body, and droops down below, like unto a hakama".) Ono Ranzan's Honzōkōmoku keimō (1803) also drew information secondhand from the Yamato honzō. (Note: Ranzan also knew or read the Chinese source Kunyu waiji, since he cites it concerning the tusk of the walrus (海馬) in a passage below.。)

Whereas Tanikawa Kotosuga's Japanese dictionary Wakun no shiori (和訓栞; publ. 1777–1887) which also describes the woman captured in the sea of Holland (Note: Japanese: "喝蘭達〔カランダ〕にて海中にて一女人を得" Karanda nite kaichū nite nyonin wo e.) (correctly) stated that her she lived and worked for many years, and her drooping skin was as if "she wore a hōfuku 袍服", i.e., paofu attire, as in the Chinese source Zhifang waiji. (Note: Also, Zhifang waiji transliterates Holland as 喝蘭達 (Helanda) which is unusual, and the same transliteration is used in this Japanese work ( pronunciation supplied as "Karanda").) (Note: Tanikawa Kotosuga. Wakun no shiori: kōhen 倭訓栞 後編, apud Kōbunko.)

Yamamura Saisuke (d. 1807), in his posthumously published work Seiyō zakki (西洋雑記) also (correctly) describes the sea woman of Holland as being captured in Purmer Lake (Note: Japanese: "ピュルメル・メエル".) and then taken to Haarlem, (Note: Yamamura Saisuke 山村才輔. Seiyō zakk 西洋雑記. Dai-2-kan, page 5, apud Mozume (1922b), p. 41.) as recorded in Dutch sources. (Note: Petrus's history also notes the capture occurred at "Purmer-Meer" and that she was taken to Haarlem.) Yamamura used the term strange/wondrous thing (異物, ibutsu) instead of a kaijin or sea woman, but Mozume Takami observed it to be the same as the hairen described in the Kunyu waiji. He added these were beings which European sources called zei mensen (ゼイ・メンセン（海人）) (i.e., Dutch: zee-mensen, "mer-man") or zei mensen (ゼエ・フロウー（海女）) (i.e., Dutch: "Zee-Vrouwe", "mer-maid").

According to some, the kaijin was actually a misidentified sea lion or seal.

== See also ==
- hairenyu
- umibōzu・kaiōshō
- 海和尚 (also umiōshō)
- ningyo
