= Ningyo =

Japanese mythological creature

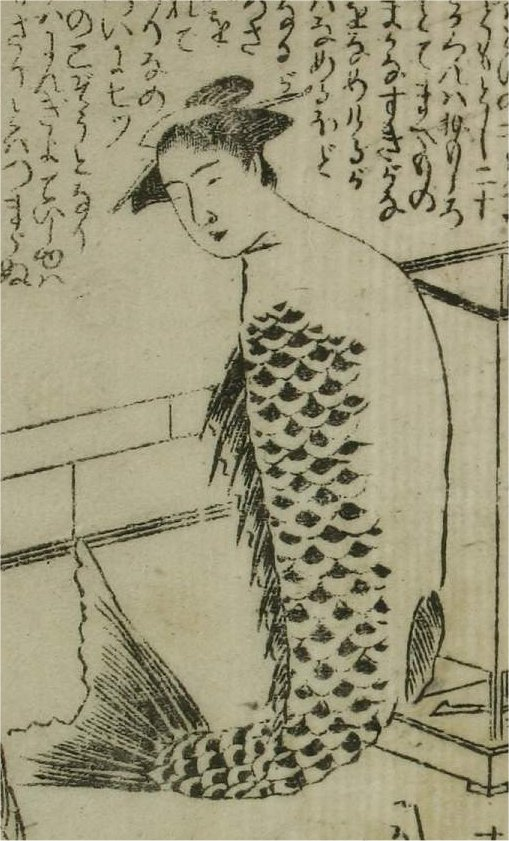
Japanese mermaid (ningyo). Coiffed with nihongami hairstyle of the Edo Period. — Santō Kyōden Hakoiri musume menya ningyō (1791)

Ningyo (人魚; "human fish"), is a creature with both human and fish-like features, described in various pieces of Japanese literature.

Though often translated as "mermaid", the term is technically not gender-specific and may include the "mermen". The literal translation "human-fish" has also been applied.

== Overview ==
The earliest records of the ningyo attested in written Japanese sources are freshwater beings allegedly captured in the 7th century (§Asuka period), documented later in the Nihon Shoki. (Note: Though not explicitly called "ningyo" in the Nihon Shoki.) But subsequent examples are usually seawater beings. (Note: An odd intervening example of a freshwater ningyo is the one reportedly caught during the Kōnin era (810–824) in Lake Biwa, according to Kō Yamato honzō betsuroku ('Records of the Expanded Japanese Pharmacopoeia') of the Edo Period.)

In later medieval times (§Kamakura and Muromachi periods)), it was held to be a sign of ill omen, and its beaching (§Omens in Michinoku) was blamed for subsequent bloody battles or calamity.

The notion that eating its flesh imparts longevity is attached to the legend of the Yao Bikuni ('eight hundred [year old] Buddhist priestess', cf. §Yao Bikuni)

During the Edo period, the ningyo was made the subject of burlesque gesaku novels (cf. §Saikaku, 1687 and Santō Kyōden's §Hakoiri musume, 1791). There were also preserved ningyo being manufactured using fish parts (§Mummies or Feejee mermaids), and illustrated by some scholars of the period (e.g. §Baien gyofu); some such mummies are held by certain temples that have ningyo legend attached to them (cf. §Prince Shōtoku).

The description of the ningyo as having a red cockscomb (§Shokoku rijindan, and Saikaku) or light red hair (§Kasshi yawa) corroborates the hypothesis that oarfish sightings led to ningyo lore.

One giant ningyo was allegedly shot in 1805, even though it was held to be lucky, according to the news circulated in kawaraban pamphlet form (§Kairai)

== Terminology ==
The Japanese ningyo (人魚; literally "human-fish") has been glossed in a noted dictionary (Kojien) as a "fabulous creature" which is "half woman, half fish", later revised to "half human (usually woman) and half fish". Hence the term ningyo includes not just the mermaid but the merman also.

Accordingly, the ningyo is sometimes referred to by the verbatim translation "human-fish" in English-language scholarship, thus allowing for the gender ambiguity.

The term ningyo was not explicitly used in the earliest accounts (cf. §Asuka period, year 619) recorded in the Nihon shoki (720 AD). A later embellished account in Shōtoku Taishi Denryaku involving Prince Shōtoku claims that the Prince Regent knew the term ningyo, though this is regarded with skepticism. The term ningyo was likely absent from any of the primary sources used in compiling the Shoki, and nonexistent in the Japanese vocabulary during the Prince's time.

The term ningyo was also absent in medieval sources describing the Kamakura Period strandings in northern Japan §Omens in Michinoku) considered ominous. For example, a "large fish" washed ashore in the Hōji 1 (1247) according to 13th (Note: Azuma kagam 吾妻鏡 (Yoshikawa-bon) Book 36; (Hōjō-bon) Book 38, entry for Hōji 1, 29th of 5th month.) and 14th century texts. (Note: 'Hōjō kudai ki 北条九代記 8.) But these were called ningyo in a 17th-century recompilation. (Note: Hōjō godai ki 北条五代記, Book 7, Ch. 19.)

== Zoological hypotheses ==
The earliest examples (cf. §Asuka period) were caught in fresh water, and it has been hypothesized they must have actually been giant salamanders. (Note: group"lower-alpha")

Another prominent theory is that the misidentification of the dugong led to mermaid lore, but detractors pointed out that the dugong's range reaches only as far north as Okinawa (formerly the Kingdom of Ryūkyū), and so was not likely to have been seen during premodern times in various locations in Japan where mermaid legend (priestess who ate the mermaid) is known to occur. (Note: According to a survey by Harumi Takahashi, the legend is found in 28 prefectures.) However, this argument is flawed, since there were other sea mammals of the Sirenia order, namely Steller's sea cows which were native to the Bering Sea, and could have plausibly wandered into northern Japanese seas. Other sea mammals such as seals and dolphins are also candidates to have been mistaken for human-fish. (Note: A bearded seal gained the popular name Tama-chan when it wandered off its native polar seas came upstream to be seen by residents of Tokyo.)

The ichthyologist Haruo Takashima also pointed out that "Japanese people only saw real dugongs after the Meiji era, but there are eyewitness testimonies of mermaids in older times".

An inscribed wooden slat (mokkan) containing drawings of ningyo (13th century) suggest the actual animal captured may have been a pinniped, such as a seal (cf. §Ritual offering tablet).

The ichthyologist's hypothesis that the ningyo legend originated from sightings of the red-crested oarfish (Note: First proposed by Keitarō Uchida (1960, 1962).)—which drifts ashore even in the Hokuriku region—is bolstered by the lore or reports that the ningyo has a red cockscomb (§Shokoku rijindan) or light red hair (§Kasshi yawa). (Note: In Kikuoka Senryō's essay Shokoku Rijindan, it is described as having something like a red cockscomb on its collar. In Kasshi Yawa, it is described as "pale in color, with thin red, long hair".) This cockscomb also is mentioned in the novel by §Saikaku.

== Iconography ==
Despite the ningyo being defined as half-woman, half-fish in some modern dictionaries, the ningyo has been also depicted as having a human female head resting on a fish-like body, as in the well known Japanese woodblock print kawaraban pamphlet example (shown right, q.v. §Kairai).

The ningyo reportedly caught in the 7th century became associated with then Prince Regent Shōtōku, and the creature has been depicted as a gift presented to him in picture scrolls entitled Shōtōku Taishi eden, the oldest surviving copy of this (1069) being the earliest piece of ningyo art in Japan. There are multiple copies of the scrolls in existence. Also, much later in the 19th century. An example is the ningyo represented as a composite of the goddess Kannon and a fish (cf. §Prince Shōtoku and fig.).

The ningyo was human-headed in the 11th century anecdote involving the head of the Taira clan (cf. §Presented to Tadamori), The stranded ningyo had "four limbs" like a human or had hands and feet but was scaly and fish-headed. (Note: "hojo-kudaiki") which were reported in Northern Japan in the 12th and 13th centuries and interpreted as omens (cf. §Omens in Michinoku) There has also been unearthed a wooden tablet with an illustration of such an ill-omened ningyo date to this period (c. 1286) (cf. )

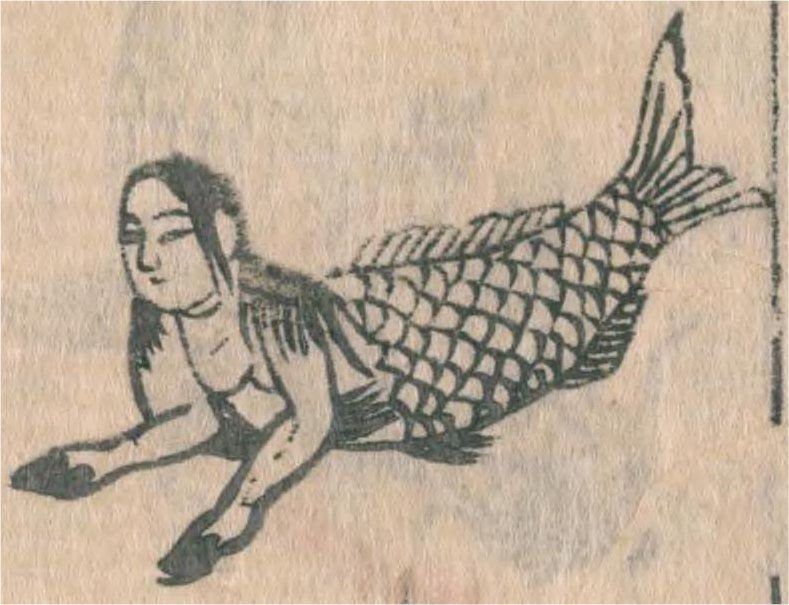
The ningyo (人魚) aka ryōgyo (鯪魚; 'hill-fish') (cf. full image) (Note: Wakan sansai zue (1712). Book 49 on Fish&Shellfish)

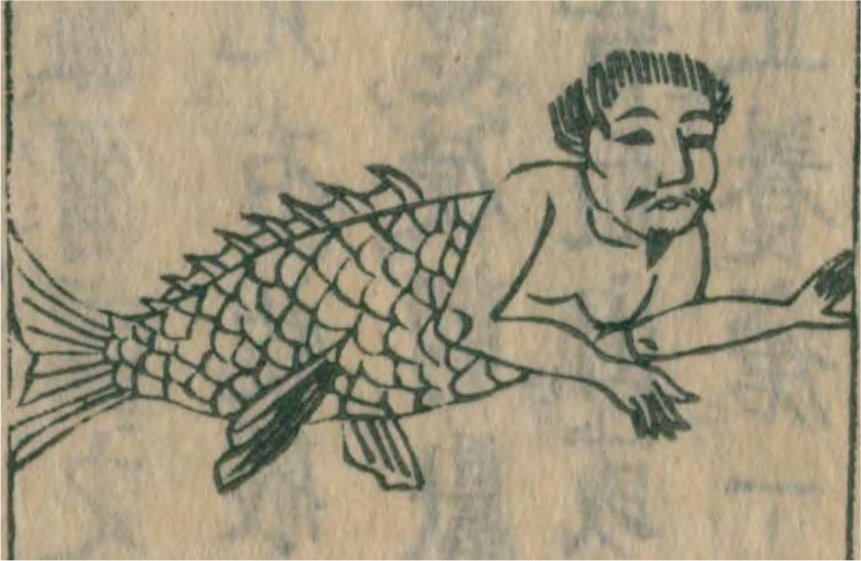
The Teijin (氐人), or the "Di people" (Note: Book 14 on Foreign peoples.)

— Wakan sansai zue (1712) (Note: Although Fujisawa reproduced these images consecutively in his essay, they were neither adjacent or even in the same book in Wakan sansai zue.)

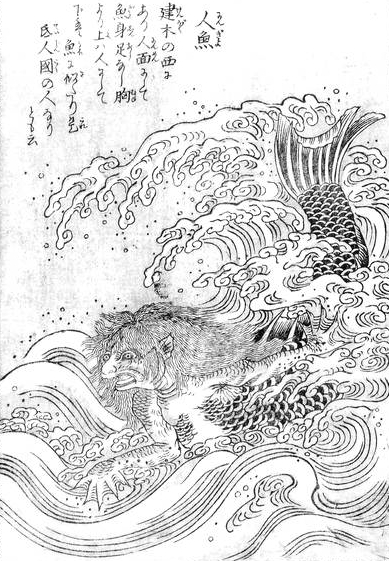
A ningyo (人魚), aka Teijin (氐人) or a Di countryman —Toriyama Sekien's Konjaku Hyakki Shūi (1781)

But during the Edo period, illustrations of ningyo were varied, and in popular literature for entertainment (such as the kibyōshi genre), both human-headed fish type (armless) and half-human type with arms were illustrated (cf. §Two archetypes). One theory is that the two types derive from Classical Chinese literature, in particular the limbed lingyu ("hill-fish") and the limbless chiru ("red ru fish") passed down from the ancient Shan hai jing ("Classic of Mountains and Seas") (cf. § Chinese lingyu and chiru).

=== Chinese literature ===
However, this explanation is compromised by the fact that the Chinese "hill-fish" is considered four-limbed, and illustrated as such, whereas it was actually the Japanese work Wakan sansai zue (1712) which transformed the image of the Chinese "hill-fish" to that of a two-armed legless one (cf. fig. right), while equating it with the Japanese ningyo. And this illustration has struck commentators as closely resembling the Western mermaid. (cf. § Ningyo in Wakan sansai zue) The Wakan sansai zue did also give notice and print the facsimile illustration of the merfolk pronounced Teijin in Japanese (Diren or Di peoplein Chinese (Note: Here distinguished from historical Di (Five Barbarians), though a commentator could be found equating these peoples.)) mentioned in the classic Shan hai jing, which were indeed illustrated as two-armed merfolk in Chinese sources.

Also, what the yōkai wood-block print illustrator Toriyama Sekien drew (1781, fig. left) was not a Japanese ningyo but one dwelling in the far reaches of China west of a World tree (kenboku; pinyin: jianmu 建木). The caption adds that such ningyo was also known as the people of the Di Nation.

=== Siren-mermaids recorded by Europeans ===
The Japanese Shogunate had acquired a copy of Johannes Jonston's Natural History in Dutch (1660) already by 1663, containing illustrations of the Western siren-mermaid. But it is not clear whether such "Dutch" (Rangaku, Western learning) images got widely disseminated in Japan before Ōtsuki Gentaku's Rokumotsu shinshi (六物新志; 'New Treatise on Six Things', 1786), which digested this and other works on the topic of mermaid, with reproduced illustrations.

By the late Edo Period (mid to late 19th century), the visual iconography of the ningyo came gradually to match the half-human half-fish of the European mermaid.

== Yao Bikuni ==
One of the most famous folk stories involving ningyo (or rather the flesh of the human-fish), purports that a girl who ate it acquired everlasting youth and longevity, and became the nun Yao Bikuni (八百比丘尼; "eight-hundred (years) Buddhist priestess")(ja) also read Happyaku Bikuni, living to the age of 800 years. (Note: Though she lived for 800 years in most versions, in some versions her lifespan is 200, 400, other number of years. She is also called Shira Bikuni/Shiro Bikuni (白比丘尼; "white nun/priestess") by some sources. According to local legend in Okayama Prefecture, she was called Sennen Bikuni (千年比丘尼) and lived 1000 years. Hayashi Razan (Honchō jinjakō) relates the legend of Shira Bikuni (白比丘尼) who lived 400 years.)

=== Summary ===
In the typical version the girl who ate the ningyo was from Obama, Wakasa Province, and as a nun dwelled in a iori grass hut on the mountain at Kūin-ji temple in the region. She traveled all over Japan in her life, but then she resolves to end her life in her home country, and sealed herself in a cave where she dwelled or has herself buried alive on the mountain at the temple, (Note: According to the Kūin-ji temple's "Abbreviated history (ryaku engi) of Yaobikuni", she dwelled in a humble abode (iori) at Mount Nochise next to where a shrine stands, and entered the cave on the same Mt. Nochise within the premises of the temple.) and requests a camellia tree be planted at the site as indicator of whether she still remains alive.

In a version passed down at Obama, Wakasa, the sixteen-year-old girl eats the ningyo inadvertently, after her father receives the prepared dish as a guest, so that the family is not implicated in knowingly eating the ningyo or butchering it. The Kūin-ji temple history claims the father to have been a rich man named Takahashi, descended from the founder of the province, and when the daughter turned 16, the dragon king appeared in the guise of a white-bearded man and gave her the flesh as a gift. But there are versions known all over Japan, and the father is often identified as a fisherman. A fisherman reeled in the ningyo but discarded it due to its strangeness, but the young daughter had picked it up and eaten it, according to one telling. (Note: Yamazaki Yoshishige (1796–1856)'s essay.)

=== Time period ===
The oldest written sources of the legend date from the 15th century, and one of these sources relate that the Shira Bikuni (白比丘尼; "white nun") appeared in Kyoto in the middle of that century (year 1449) at age 800. (Note: Zuikei Shūhō's diary Gaun nikkenroku (臥雲日件録) claims she appeared in Kyoto on the 26th day of the 7th month of Hōtoku 1 (1449)—actually still Bun'an 6, which was not changde to Hōtoku 1 until the 28th of this month though another source, the Yasutomi-ki ("Nakahara no Yasutomi's diary") states she appeared on the 5th month that year, aged 200.)

Assuming age 800 in keeping with her commonly used name, her birth can be back dated to around the mid-7th century, during the Asuka Period. (Note: Yanagita backdates her birth to the Taika era (645–650), but the temple's document claims she was born Hakuchi 5 (year 654).)

Folklorist Morihiko Fujisawa's chronology makes her a survivor from an even older age. He dated Yao Bikuni eating ningyo flesh in the year 480 AD during the Kofun Period (Tumulus Period). (Note: Given as 5th year of Emperor Seinei or Japanese imperial year (Kōki) 1140 according to the system used until World War II, which is 480 A.D. Fujisawa in the previous chapter places Yaobikuni's birth at the 12th year of Yūryaku (Kōki 1128), namely 468 A.D.) However, no written source for this could be evinced, according to a recent researcher, and an oral tradition is presumed.

== Asuka period ==
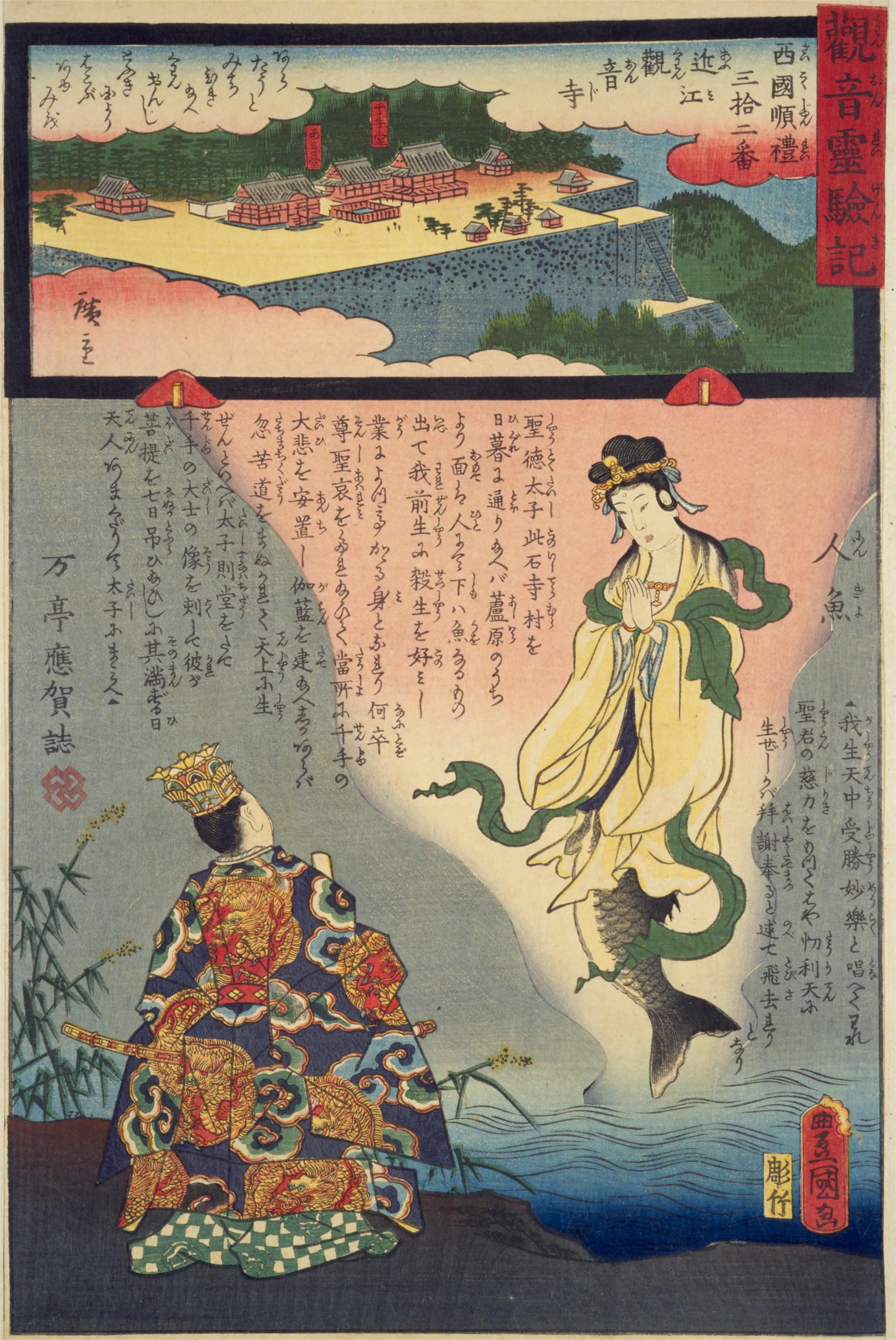
Ningyo mermaid appears before Prince Shōtoku (foundation myth of Kan'onji [Kannonji] temple in Ōmi). —(Lower scene) Toyokuni III aka Kunisada; (Upper landscape) Hiroshige II. Kan'on reigenki: "Saikoku junrei No. 32. Ōmi Kannonji. Ningyo"

In the 27th year of Empress Suiko (619, man-like fish were supposedly netted twice: on Gamō River (蒲生河) (Note: Presumably the present-day Hino River or its tributary Sakura River (佐久良川).) in Ōmi Province during the 4th month, and in Horie, Settsu Province (Horie River, an artificial canal no longer extant), according to the Nihon shoki.

They were freshwater creatures, and the description of it being "childlike" suggested its true identity to be the Japanese giant salamander according to Minakata Kumagusu. (Note: group"lower-alpha")

=== Prince Shōtoku ===
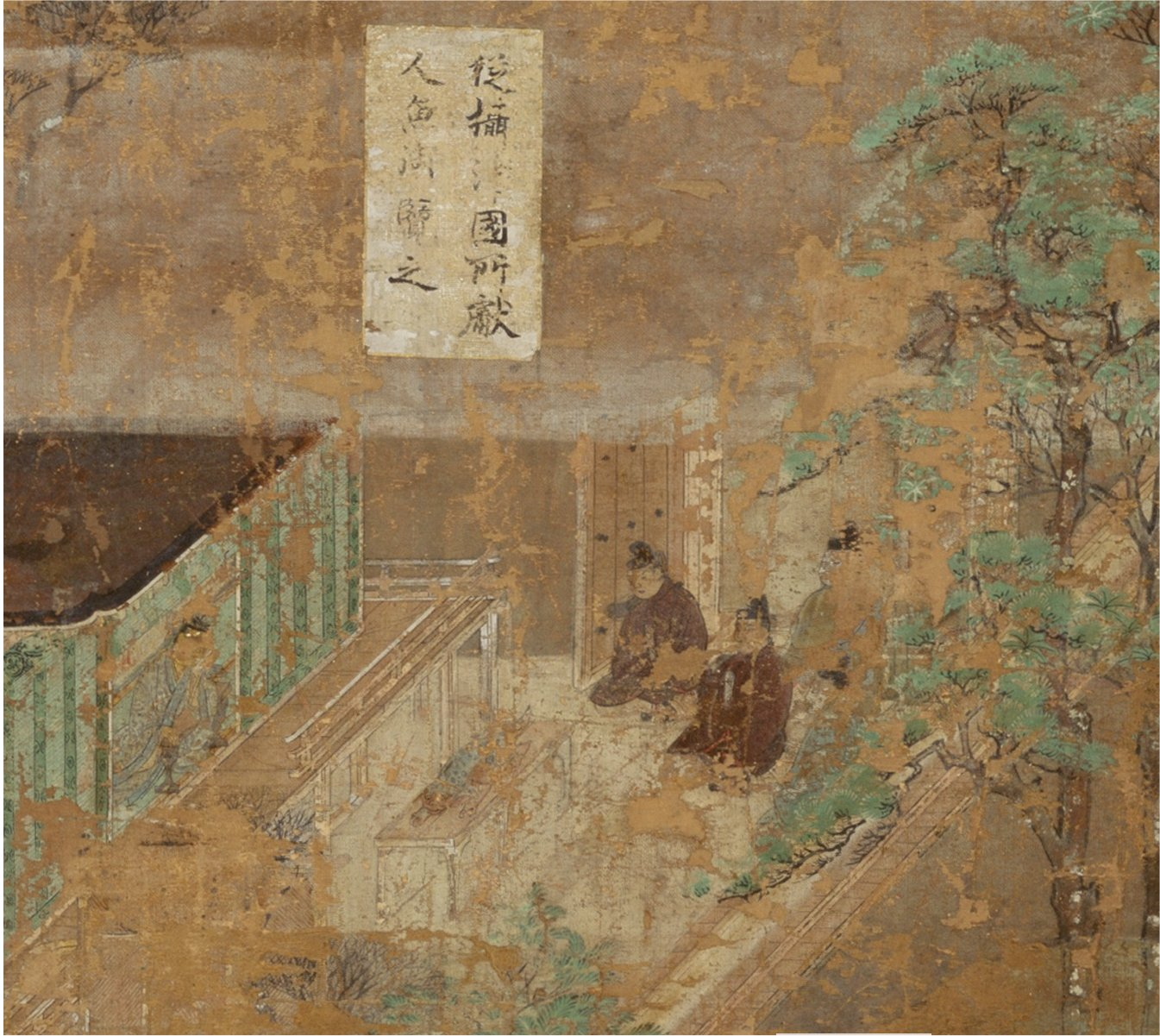
Prince Shōtoku examining a ningyo (human-fish) brought from Settsu Province — Shotoku Taishi eden (1069). Attributed to artist Hata no Chisin 秦致真

Crown Prince Shōtoku at age 48 was allegedly presented with a ningyo from Settsu Province, but he abhorred the unlucky gift and ordered it to be discarded immediately. This account occurs in a picture scroll called Shōtoku Taishi eden. There were some 40 copies of this made, of which the copy held by Hōryū-ji temple, dated to 1069 is the oldest known pictorial depiction of the Japanese ningyo.

While Shoki never used the term ningyo explicitly, Prince Shōtoku had been involved in the Gamō River incident and knew to use the term, according to the prince's abridged history or Denryaku. Shōtoku also knew the ningyo to bring forth disaster according to the Denryaku, and an annotation provides that it was customary for fishermen at the time to release a ningyo if ever caught in the net. (Note: Asai Ryōi, Shōtoku taishi denryaku bikō (聖徳太子伝暦備講). The Ishibajimura Kannonji engi (石場寺村観音寺縁起) supposedly iterates this custom also according to Fujisawa, but the elusive document is hardly referenced elsewhere.) When the prince was alarmed by the ill omen of a ningyo appearing in Ōmi Province, he had a statue of the Kannon goddess placed in the vicinity, according to document preserved at Ganjō-ji temple. (Note: This Ganjō-ji is the scene of a legend about a ningyo who fell in love with a nun and was mummified, and the temple owns the alleged mummy.)

According to the engi or foundation myth of Kannonshō-ji, Prince Shōtoku met a ningyo in a pool (Note: Presumably of the "Gamō River", as given in the Nihon shoki.) near Lake Biwa who confessed to have been reborn in its shape due to poor deeds in past life, and the prince performed service to provide it salvation by building a temple to house a Kannon goddess statue, which was the origins of this temple. (Note: The list of 33 pilgrimage spots of the Saigoku Kannon Pilgrimage identifies number 32 as Kannon-shōji. However, the Kannon reijōki zue No. 32 names Ishiba-ji mura (石場寺村 [sic.] instead of Ishidera mura). This seems to be erroneous confusion with the Ishiba-ji temple, except that Fujisawa claimed existence of the document Ishibajimura Kannonji engi (石場寺村観音寺縁起), as aforementioned.)

== Late Nara period ==
After the Asuka Period, the two oldest appearances of the ningyo are dated to the mid- to late Nara Period, and these were situated by the sea.

An ningyo beached on Yasui-no-ura in Izumo Province (a bay in present-day Yasugi, Shimane) in the Tenpyō-shōhō 8 or the year 756 AD, and later, another one appeared in Susu-no-misaki in Noto Province (a peninsula in present-day Suzu, Ishikawa) in the year Hōki 9/778. These reports are preserved in a Kagenki (嘉元記; Jōji 2/1363), an old document concerning Hōryū-ji, the temple closely associated with Prince Shōtoku.

== Heian period ==
=== Presented to Tadamori ===
(Ise Province. c. 1140s. In Kokon Chomonjū)

An anecdote of three presumed "ningyo" caught in a net in Beppo (別保) in Ise Province, (Note: Also read "Beppō" or "Betsuho". In present-day Mie Prefecture. Beppō corresponds to what was the town of Kawage in Age District, but in 2006 this town was merged into the city of Tsu, Mie in 2006, and became the Kawage area of the city; the District was abolished as well.) is found in the Kokon Chomonjū ("Collection of Tales Heard, Present and Past", 1254) from the mid-Kamakura Period. (Note: Tachibana no Narisue Kokon Chomonjū 古今著聞集, Book 20, "Chapter 30 Fish, Insects, Birds and Animals 魚虫禽獣", paragraph 712 Matter of the Fishermen of Beppo, Ise Province Capturing Human-Fish and Presenting them to Former Junior Assistant Minister of Justice [Gyōbu-shōyū] Tadamori 伊勢国別保の浦人人魚を獲て前刑部少輔忠盛に献上の事. 伊勢國別保（べつほ）といふ所へ、前（さきの）刑部（ぎやうぶの）少輔（せう）忠盛朝臣（あそん）下りたりけるに、浦人日ごとに網を引きけるに、或日大なる魚の、頭は人のやうにてありながら、歯はこまかにて魚にたがはず、口さし出でて猿に似たりけり。身はよのつねの魚にてありけるを、三喉ひき出したりけるを、二人してになひたりけるが、尾なほ土に多くひかれけり。人の近くよりければ、高くをめくこゑ、人のごとし、又涙をながすも、人にかはらず。驚きあざみて、二喉をば、忠盛朝臣の許へもて行き、一喉をば浦人にかへしてければ、浦人みな切り食ひてけり。されどもあへてことなし。その味殊によかりけるとぞ。人魚といふなるは、これていのものなるにや”。)

The event dates a century earlier than the anthology: when Taira no Tadamori (d. 1153; father of Kiyomori) had moved his residence (Note: Tadamori was by then the former Junior Assistant Minister of Justice (刑部少輔, gyōbu-no-shō). Castiglioni simplifies to "former magistrate".) to this place, populated by "bayside villagers" (fishermen).

The big fish had human-like heads (but also sets of fine teeth like fish, and a protruding mouths like a monkey's), with fish-like bodies. When hauled to land and carried (by pairs of fishermen) with the tails dragging, the creatures screamed in high-pitched voice and shed tears like a human. The tale concludes with the presumption that creatures must have been ningyo (human-fish). The three ningyo were presented to Tadamori, but one was returned to the bay's villagers (fishermen), who carved it up and ate it. (Note: There are different interpretations regarding the divvying up of the ningyo. Here the rendering that <all the villagers ate 1 ningyo> is followed: "Two were presented to courtier Tadamori, and the remaining one the bay villagers sliced and ate 二疋は忠盛朝臣に献上し、残りの一疋は浦人共が割いて食べた（Iwaya Sazanami's edited translation）has been followed. However, in Castiglioni's rendering <single fisherman ate all 3>: "The noble Tadamori was probably afraid [of accepting the gift] and returned [the creatures] to the fisherman who cut and ate them all", so that a single fisherman ate all three. Castiglioni's rendering is roughly echoed by other Japanese commentators (Kawamura & Asami), except that their version is that <multiple fishermen ate all 3>.) It was exquisitely delicious, and no special effects came of it. (Note: Cf. "No particular curse (ill effect) came of [eating it] 別に何の祟もなかったと云ふ" (Iwaya tr.) vs. "Those [creatures] were not so strange" (Castiglioni))

== Kamakura and Muromachi periods ==
=== Omens in Michinoku ===
(Mutsu and Dewa Provinces . Hōjō kudai ki, Azuma kagami, etc.)

There had been frequent beachings of ningyo in Mutsu or Dewa Province (Michinoku region) according to the Hōjō godai ki (printed 1641),, and each sighting is treated as an omen, associated with some armed conflict or ill fortune which struck afterwards:

- Bunji 5 (1189) summer. Beaching at Soto-no-hama (in Mutsu). Presaging extermination of Fujiwara no Hidehira's sons
- Kennin 3 (1203), 4th month. Tsugaru-no-ura. (Note: "Tsugaru-no-ura" would have to be some bay in the Tsugaru Region ≈old Tsugaru District, Mutsu, but no clarification is made, so it might be the shore of the Sea of Japan facing west from Tsugaru, Aomori or possibly Aomori Bay facing north from the current-day Higashitsugaru District, Aomori.) Minamoto no Sanetomo harmed by evil zen priest.
- Kenpo 1 (1213). Akita-no-ura, Dewa. Same year, Wada Conflict.
- Hōji 1 (1247). 11th day of 3rd month. A fish-headed but human cadaver like fish. Tsugaru-no-ura. Same year, Miura no Yasumura's uprising (i.e., the Hōji Conflict))

Actually all these cases, culminating in the Hōji 1 event, were recorded in much older Azuma kagami (chronicle up to year 1266) and the Hōjō kudai ki (aka Kamakura nendai ki, 1331) except that the creature is not called a "ningyo" but rather a "large fish" (which was human cadaver-like with "four limbs"), or a creature "having hands and feet, covered in overlapping scales, and a head no different than a fish's". And these near-contemporary sources also interpret the ningyo ("big fish") appearances as presaging major warfare occurring within that year.

In Hōji 1, on the very same day (11th of 3rd month) when "big fish" was beached up north in Tsugaru, Michinoku (or perhaps the day preceding) the ocean by the Yuigahama (beach) was bright scarlet, and reported to have changed to blood. Yuigahama was the location of bloodshed on a number of occasion. The reason it may have indeed turned scarlet was possibly due to a red tide occurrence.)

The Hōji 1 event was discussed in one late source, called the Honchō nendaiki (本朝年代記) (published Jōkyō1/1684), (Note: Shinpen bunrui honchō nendaiki 新編分類本朝年代記 Book 1, "Jin・zatsu no rui 仁・雑之類"; Bunrui honchō nendaiki 分類本朝年代記 130.) but this miscopies the day to the "20th of the 3rd month", which makes it the probably direct source of Ihara Saikaku's fictional piece in which a ningyo appears. (Note: Maeda, Kingoro ed. (1967) Budōdenraiki 武道伝来記, note 52.) (Note: Saikaku also shifts the site of the beaching to Tsugar-no-Ōura (Ōura in Tsugaru), as does Osamu Dazai's adaptation of the ningyo story. but other sources state Tugaru-no-ura or "Tsugaru Bay".)

There are two later sightings in the 14th century recorded in the aforementioned Kagenki. The second sighting occurred after the fall of the Kamakura Shogunate, and belongs in the Muromachi Period.

- Enkyō 3 (1310), 11th of 4th month. In Obama-no-tsu Obama Bay in Wakasa Province. It was considered "auspicious" (目出度（めでた）かり, medetakari) to the land, and was named Shinsen (真仙; 'True Immortal'). (Note: The compilation Shiseki shūran, quoting from Kagenki.)
- Enbun2 (1357), 3rd of rabbit(2nd/4th) month. (Note: The text gives u-no-tsuki, which could mean the 2nd or 4th month. Note that the same source, Kagenki gave shigatsu for the fourth month. Fujisawa inexplicably converted to the 3rd month, though there is an entirely different record from Hōreki 1/1789 (cf. below) which states "rabbit third month (卯の三月, u no sangatsu)".) Appeared in Futami-ura, Ise Province. It seemed to bestow "longevity" (長久なるべし, chōkyū naru beshi), and was named Enmeiju (延命寿; 'Life-extended Lifespan').

Although these two cases appear to be auspicious omens, Fujisawa insists these examples do not corroborate the notion that the ningyō itself was seen as an auspicious object, since the attributions of good luck were consigned here via association with the Yao-bikuni's longevity or the sacredness of Futami-ura bay.

There is subsequently a gap, and the next record listed occurred in the warring period (Sengoku period) part of the Muromachi Period:

- Tenbun19 (1550), 21st of 4th month. A ningyo was caught in the sea off Ōno-no-kōri (ancient district), Bungo Province (current-day Ōita Prefecture). It was presented to the shogun's household. It cried like a deer, and died after 10 days. (Note: Kōgen bukan. The reliability of this book has been questioned, and some claim this to be attributed to a pseudoauthor.)

A description of deer-like voice is unusual, since the ningyo is typically said to sound like a human child or infant.

The archeological find in Akita (cf. §Ritual offering tablet) from the same era as listed above also can be counted as another example of the Michinoku region. There are also later anecdotes in the Tsugaru Province occurring in the Edo Period, but these will be discussed below under (§Tsugaru domain).

==== Ritual offering tablet ====
A drawings of a ningyo was found on a piece of wooden tablet excavated in the Suzaki archaeological site at Ikawa, Akita. It was discovered at the remains of a well, (Note: Jammed between the outer wall (made of two halves of a log which had served as a dugout canoe) and the oval magemono cistern. Castiglioni (2021), pp. 15–17 stating "between the external stone wall and the internal wooden one", does not coincide with his source, the Takahashi et al. (2000) report) The tablet measures 80.6 cm×14.5 cm×0.5 cm), and dated to some time close to 1286. (Note: The wood used for the well was dated as being logged down in 1286 using tree ring analysis, and the tablet was assumed to have been made not too many years apart from that.)

The ningyo is human-headed and fish-bodied, except it has two arms and two legs alongside a finned tail. Except for the face its entirety is covered with marks which apparently represent scales. The actual animal was probably a seal, or some sort of pinniped, according to the archaeologists' report. (Note: The site lies adjacent to Hachirōgata lagoon, and only a short canal separates it from the sea, i.e. Akita Bay. That bay's old name was Akita-no-ura, where a ningyo sighting was recorded (cf. above). There is also some possibility that "Akita-no-ura" might have referred to the Hachirō lagoon itself.)

The inscriptions have been transcribed as "Ara, tsutanaya, teuchi ni tote sōrō, sowaka (Oh, pity, but let it be killed, sowaka)" and similarly "Oh, pity, bound up like that even though a human, sowaka". Since the beast was considered ill omen, the Buddhist priest (also illustrated on the tablet) probably made offering in the form of prayer, "sowaka" being a Sanskrit word often chanted at the end of the mantra.

== Edo period ==
Certainly by the Edo Period, there developed a gender bias towards the ningyo being mostly female, due to European influence, though there might have Buddhist influence (daughters of the dragon-king of the sea) that may have contributed as well. Still, there have been preserved some illustrated examples of mermen in the Edo Period (§Male ningyo).

=== Alleged sightings ===
==== Shokoku rijindan ====
A sighting of a ningyo alleged in Wakasa Province in the Hōei (era), probably c. 1705, was recorded by Kikuoka Senryō in Shokoku rijindan ("Stories of Common Folk [from the Provinces]", 1740s). It reportedly had a red cockscomb-like appendage at the collar, which parallels what Saikaku stated in his novel (1674, cf. below) regarding the ningyo possessing a cockscomb on its head.

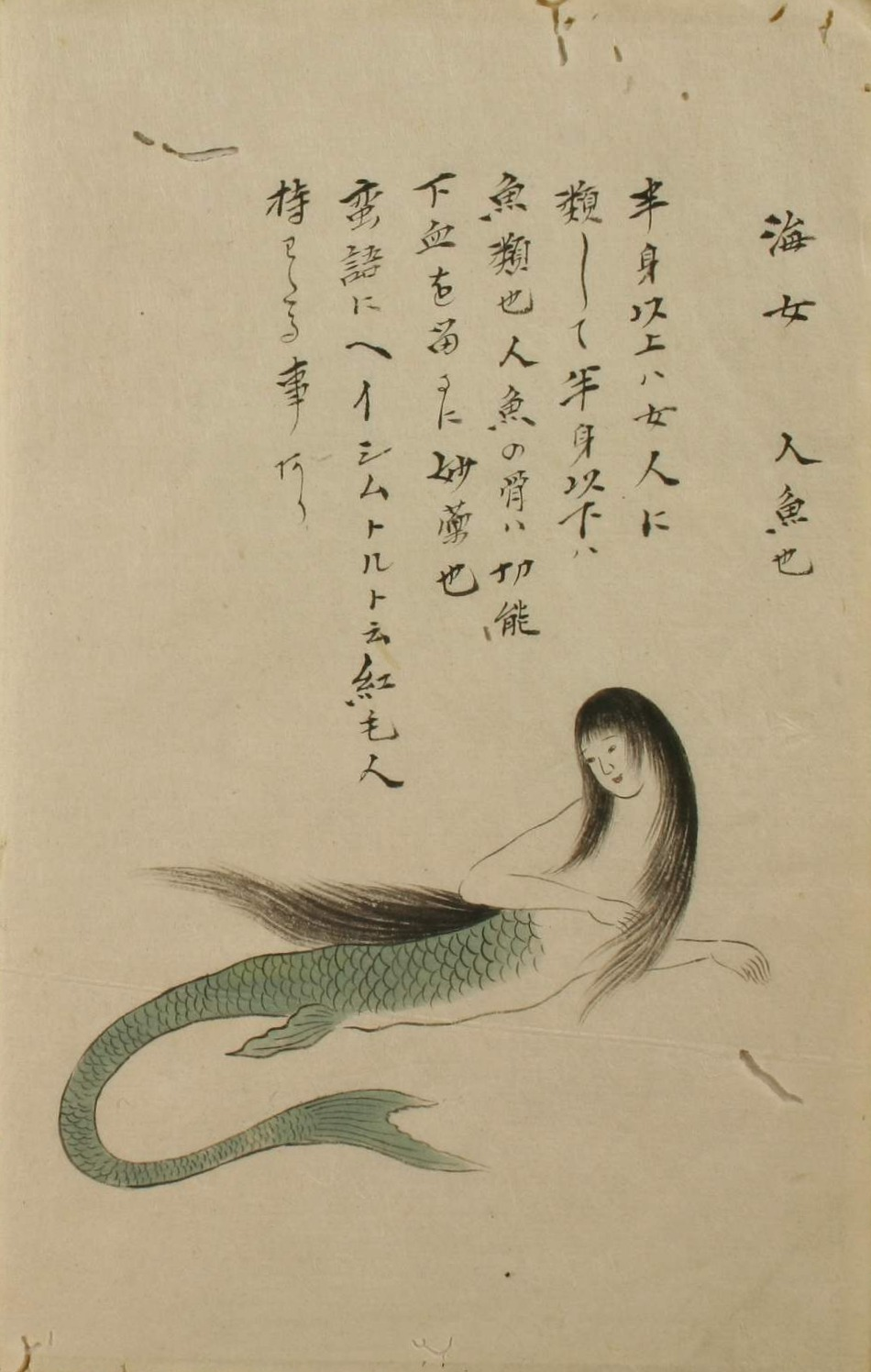
Kaijo (i.e. ningyo) 海女（人魚也） — Hirokawa Kai. Nagasaki bunkenroku nukigaki or "Excerpts from the Records of Things Heard and Seen in Nagasaki". Waseda U. Library.

==== Kasshi yawa ====
A mid-18th century account of a ningyo sighting was recorded by samurai daimyo essayist Matsura Seizan, in his Kasshi yawa. It occurred in the early part of the Enkyō era (1744–1748), and his named sources were his own uncle Hongaku-in (本学院, Matsura Kunishi) and aunt Kōshō-in (光照院). (Note: This Kōshō-in was wife of daimyo Inagaki Terunaka and daughter of Matsura Sanenobu.) On their journey by sea from Hirado Domain en route to Edo, they encountered a ningyo around the Genkai Sea, in an area where no ama (female diving fishermen) could be expected to operate. It surfaced more than 10 ken (≈20 meters) ahead of the vessel, and at first, its lower half could not be seen, but its "guise was woman-like, with pale bluish hue, and light red hair which was long"; then it smiled and dove down, at which point the fish-like tail-end made its appearance, allowing the witnesses to determine it was a ningyo.

==== Nagasaki bunkenroku ====
Though written much later, a work by Hirakawa Kai (廣川獬) called Nagasaki bunkenroku/kenbunroku (長崎聞見録/見聞録; "Records of Things Heard and Seen in Nagasaki", pub. Kansei12/1800), reports side-by-side on both a kaijin "mer-human" and a kaijo ("mer-woman", glossed as being a ningyo). (Note: It also carries an article on the rashima (落斯馬), or rosuma, which Minakata Kumagusu said was a Chinese transliteration of Norwegian rosmer denoting a walrus, which is illustrated here as having two horns growing from the head and bending forward.) The text for the kaijo aka ningyo reads "Above the body's midsection it is a sort of female human, and below midsection a type of fish. The ningyo bones are remarkable medicine with the effect of stemming the flow of anal blood. The Europeans call it ペイシムトル[ト] (peishimutoru[to]), and the Dutch sometimes carry it around". (Note: Japanese: "半身以上は女人に類して、半身以下は魚類也。人魚骨は、功能下血を留るに妙薬也。蛮語にペイシムトルトと云。紅毛人持わたる事あり".)。

==== Tsugaru domain ====
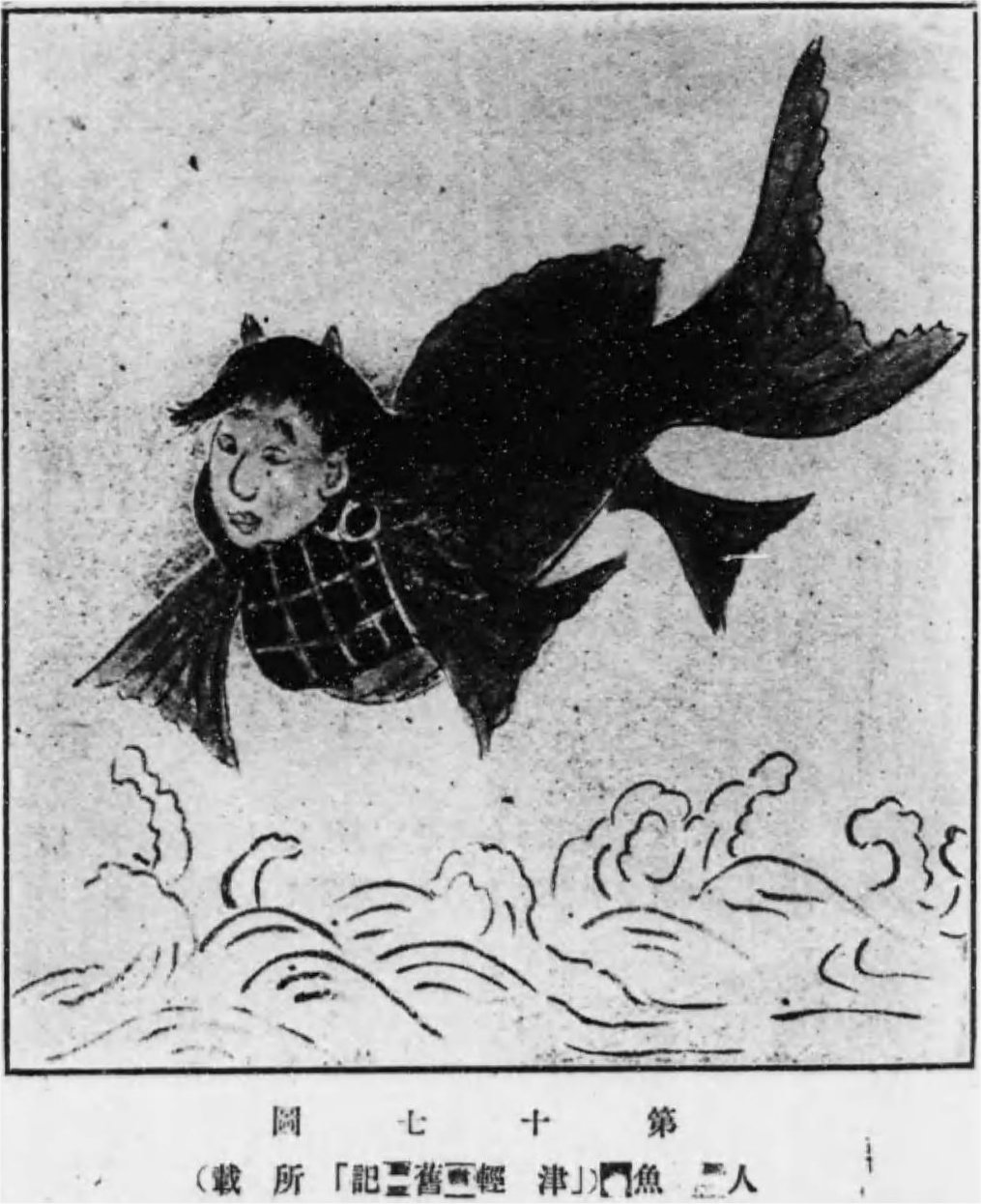
A ningyo —Attributed to Tsugaru kyūki ("Old Records of Tsugaru") by Fujisawa

The ningyo was reported captured in the Tsugaru Domain in the 17th and 18th centuries. In the latter case (given various years during the Hōreki era), ink drawings of the creature have been preserved, and is shown as wearing an apron-like kesa of Buddhist priests. Its capture was embellished into a tall tale, by way of linking it with the incident of an apprentice priest who was lost at sea a century before (explained further below).

The earlier record is that in Genroku 1/1688, a ningyo was captured at Nouchi-no-ura., (Note: Presumably a bay of the village of Nonai (though the source reads as "Nouchi"), in Higashitsugaru District. If this is the case, it must have been part of Aomori Bay.) according to the Tsugaru ittōshi (津軽一統志)

Then in Hōreki 9 (1759), (Note: Yoshioka emends to Hōreki 8 (1758). The various sources give 7th, 8th or 9th year of the era.) on the 3rd month (Note: The "rabbit third month (卯の三月, u no sangatsu)" to be precise.) at the port of Ishizaki village (Note: Ishizakisawa, part of what is now Tairadate, Aomori. It faces the Hiradate Channel.), a fish of "this shape" (i.e., as depicted in the fig. right) was reported caught, according to the Tsugaru nikki (津軽日記; 'Tsugaru diary') or Tsugaru ke henran nikki (津軽家編覧日記) (excerpted in the Tsugaru han kyūki denrui (津軽藩旧記伝類)?). (Note: Fujisawa only names the source as Tsugaru kyūki (津軽舊記（津軽旧記）), but this appears to be Tsugaru han kyūki denrui, which is a collection of excerpts from other writings.) About a hundred years before the capture, when a certain apprentice monk from Tōkō-ji (藤光寺) temple in Tsugaru was faring across the sea towards Matsumae Domain, and fell off the boat. This incident was connected to the fish catch, and when questioned the storytellers confessed they enlarged (embellished) the tall tale. A similar account with illustration is found in the Mitsuhashi nikki (三橋日記; 'Mitsuhashi diary') in the entry for Hōreki 7 (1757), later part of the 3rd month, (Note: 「Mitsuhashi nikki, held by the Hirosaki City Library.) and the creature drawn is observed to be wearing a wagesa or "ring surplice", and the text describes it as a "Light-black strange formed fish (薄黒い異形の魚)" The Hirayama nikki (平山日記; 'Hirayama diary') is yet another source, stating that in Hōreki 8, "a human-faced fish (人面魚, jinmengyo) appeared in the sea of Ishizaki village, and all manners of people went to spectate". (Note: Japanese: "石崎村海之人面魚出諸人見物ニ行".)

==== Etchū Province ningyo, aka Kairai ====
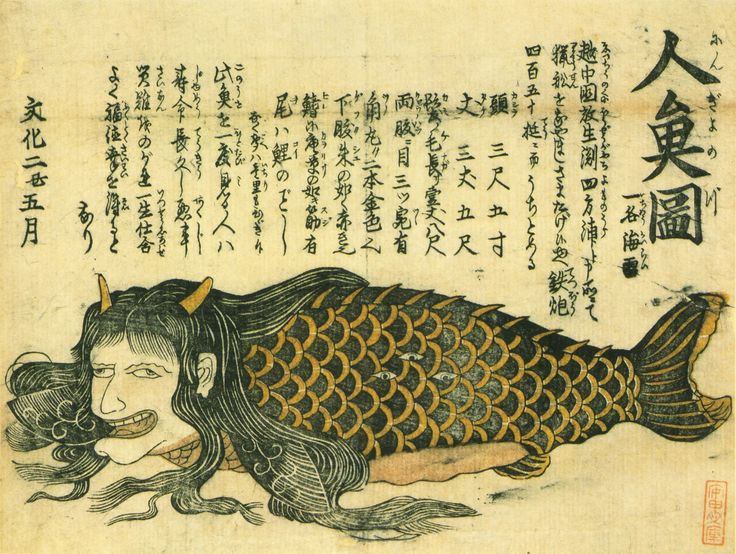
"'Ningyo no zu": A woodblock-printed flier dated 5th month of Bunka 2 (1805).

The aforementioned woodblock print from Bunka 2 (1805), entitled "Ningyo no zu. Ichimei, Kairai (人魚図。一名海雷)" publicized the appearance of a ningyo also called Kairai (海雷; "sea lightning"). It happened on the 5th month of the year, in Yokata-ura, in what is now Toyama Bay. (Note: Even though the flier itself reads "Yomo-no-ura, Hōjō-ga-fuchi, Etchū Province 越中国、放生淵四方浦", the correct reading is "Yokata-ura". Castiglioni miscopied it as Nishigataura (西方浦).)

This ningyo was a creature with head of a long-haired young woman's, a pair of golden horns, a red belly, three eyes on each side of its torso, and a carp-like tail end, according to the text of the flier. This mermaid purportedly measured 3 jō 5 shaku or 10.6 metres (35 ft).

While the printed illustration only shows one side of the ningyo, the text itself confirms it had 3 eyes on each side of the body. The feature of eyes on the torso is shared by the prediction beast kudan, also known to have appeared in Etchū Province, and the hakutaku (or baize, of Chinese origin), as scholars have pointed out.

The flier reports that the people grew frightened, and destroyed it with 450 rifles. Yet the flier also states that "A person who views this fish once will enjoy great longevity, avoid bad turns of events and disasters, and gain luck and virtue". (Note: "此魚を一度見る人、寿命長久し悪事災難をのがれ福徳を得る" (in Japanese).)

==== Male ningyo ====
There is a picture entitled "Honrable picture of male human-fish" (男人魚, onga toko ningyo) survives which was copied by the young lord of Hirosaki Domain, to be shown to his mother, wishing to impart longevity upon her. Thus this is another example of ningyo localized in the area of the Hirosaki aka Tsugaru Domain.

There is also a "Picture of ningyo that crossed to here from Holland" (阿蘭陀渡り人魚の図, Oranda watari ningyo no zu) (Note: 阿蘭陀渡里人魚の図, but 里 is read as り (ri).) printed on kawaraban newspaper, with the facial features of an old man. (Note: This newsprint was also featured in the manga Hōzuki no Reitetsu Vol. 12, p. 101, with a facsimile sketch of the print, and was offered as an example of a male ningyo. The comic cited Abe & Chiba (1996), without indication of page.) The newspaper described the creature as having "hair that was redhaired, hand like a monkey with webbings, and shaped like a snake", and purported that eating its flesh imparts longevity of 100 years, and even looking at it had the effect of warding sickness and extending lifespan.

=== Edo popular fiction ===
==== Saikaku ====
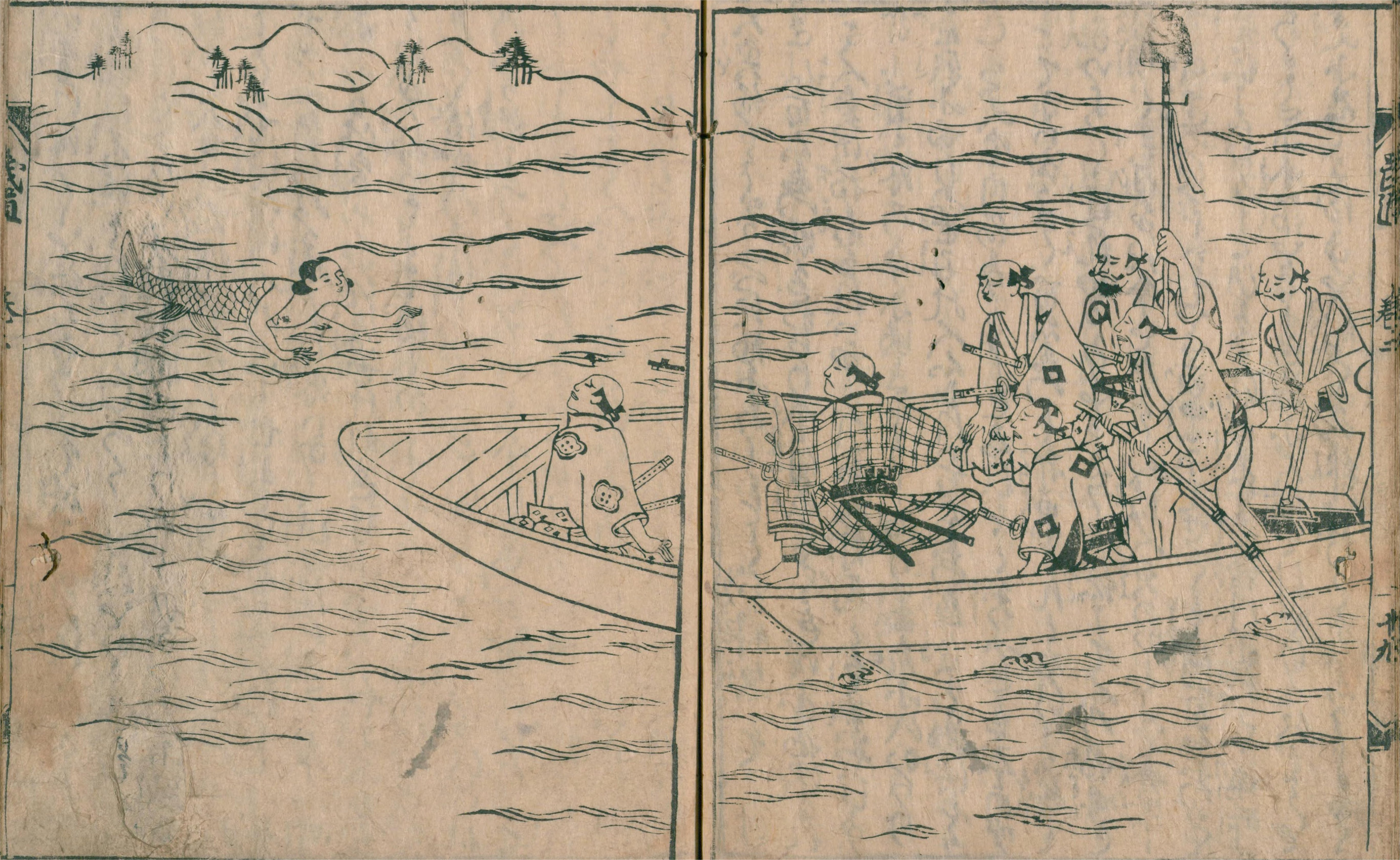
A ningyo shot at by Kinnai — Ihara Saikaku Budō denraiki (1687), illustration attributed to Yoshida Hanbei

The ningyo according to Saikaku's reckoning was first washed ashore during Emperor Go-Fukakusa's first era year (1247), (Note: The text withholds the era name as Hōji, but gives the month and day which matches the Hōji1 example cited above.) and he claims it was remembered as having "a scarlet cockscomb on its head, and a face of a beautiful woman. Four limbs like they were wrought out of jewels, golden-gleaming scales, the flesh most fragrant, and serene voice like the skylark-whistle" according to Ihara Saikaku's Budō denraiki ("Exemplary Tales of the Way of the Warrior", 1674), which features a ningyo as noted above. (Note: Saikaku (1687) Budō denraiki. 後深草院、元年三月二十日に、津軽の大浦といふ所へ、人魚はじめて流れ寄、其形ちは、かしらくれなゐの鶏冠ありて、面は美女のごとし。四足、るりをのべて、鱗に金色のひかり、身にかほりふかく、声は雲雀笛のしずかなる声せしと、世のためしに語り伝へり)

The text describes the ningyo as being equipped with four limbs but the illustration draws a mermaid without legs, and having a tail-fin instead; she also is drawn without any cockscomb-like appendage on the head. Another discrepancy is that the samurai named Kinnai had shot the ningyo with a bow (half-bow) according to the text, but the weapon has been swapped with a firearm in the illustration.

==== Hakoiri musume ====
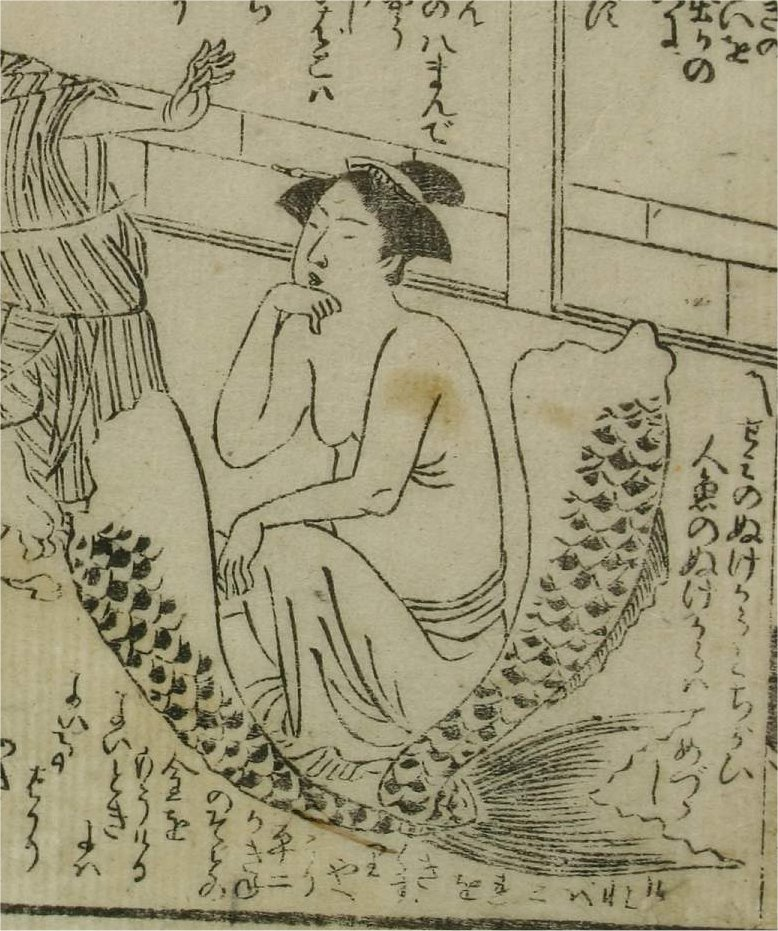
Mermaid peels out of her slough. — Santō Kyōden Hakoiri musume menya ningyō (1791)

Santō Kyōden's Hakoiri musume menya ningyō (箱入娘面屋人魚; , "Daughter in a Box: Shopfront Mermaid", 1791). (Note: The title -人魚 would be normally read "ningyo', as Castiglioni phoneticizes, but the from the cover of the work (Fujisawa (1925), p. 26, Fig. 20) one can read "にんぎゃう ningyō".) is also well known as a work during the Tokugawa era which dealt with the ningyo mermaid topic.

It is an example of work in the genre of kibyōshi or "yellow jacket", (Note: The term kibyōshi was applied to non-juvenile sophisticated works that appeared in the 1770s.) and a humorous, satirical piece, whose cast of characters include Urashima Tarō, who has an affair with a carp mistress producing a mermaid daughter in the process. (Note: As in the familiar story, Urashima resides in the Ryūgū-jō (undersea Naga Palace). But he is being kept as a male mistress (gigolo) by Oto-hime, daughter of Naga king, so he is not as dignified as to be lawfully wedded to her.) The abandoned mermaid is netted by a fisherman named Heiji. To make ends meet she engages in miuri, i.e., selling herself into prostitution, but her fish-bodied oiran repulses customers. After discovering that licking a mermaid imparts longevity, Heiji opens a mermaid-licking shoppe, gains great wealth, and decides to marry her. She grows out of her outer skin, metamorphosing into a full-fledged woman with both arms and legs. Heiji sells the mermaid's skin slough (nukegara) for profit.

==== Two archetypes ====
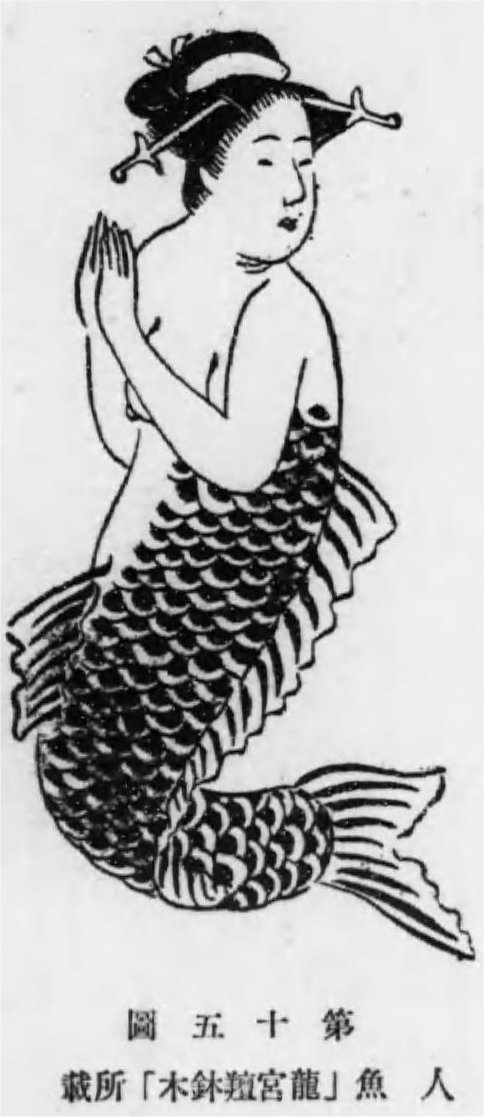
A ningyo. Tatsu no miyako namagusa hachi no ki (1793)

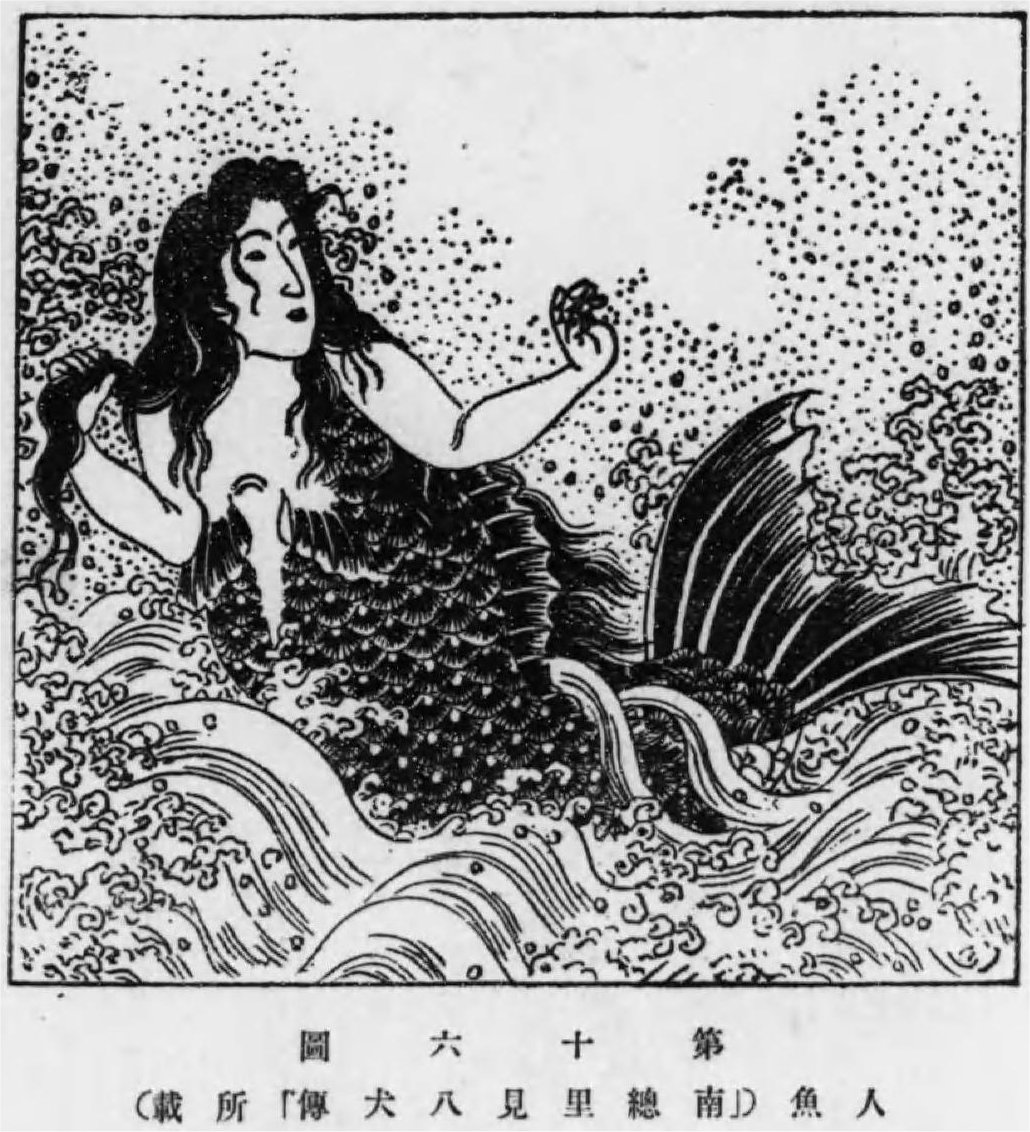
A ningyo. Nansō Satomi hakkenden (1814–1842).

More ningyo images in fiction

In the mid-Edo period, illustrations of the ningyo consisted of two broad types, as exemplified in illustrated fictional tales.

Where she is depicted as half-human with a pair of arms/hands, examples are readily given from works of fiction writers.

One example is the Tatsu no miyako namagusa hachi no ki (竜宮羶鉢木; "The Flowerpot in the Sea-Queen's Palace", 1793), co-authored by Santō Kyōden and Takizawa Bakin and illustrated by Kitao Shigemasa.

Another is the depiction of a ningyo in the famous work by Bakin, the Nansō Satomi Hakkenden (1814–42), though this work does not centrally revolve around denizens of the sea.

The other type consists of examples where she is depicted as human-headed and armless, as in the case of Kyōden's Hakoiri musume just described (cf. fig., top of page), or the Etchū Province example above.

==== Chinese lingyu and chiru ====
The dual visual representation has been attributed to the Japanese familiarity with Chinese sources that depict both types, specifically, a human-armed type of mermaid called the ryōgyo (鯪魚; pinyin: lingyu, "hill-fish") and an armless (finned) type of mermaid called the sekiju (赤鱬; pinyin: chiru, "red ru fish").

However this formulation for explaining Chinese origin does not quite succeed, since, as its proponent (Note: Fujisawa) points out, the Chinese lingyu is actually four-legged, (Note: The mythic fish língyú is compared to a four-legged marine turtle or alligator in classical Chinese texts.) (Note: Shan hai jing, illustration and caption for "Hill-fish (Lingyu) 陵魚: "The Hill-Fish has a human face, hands, feet, and a fish's body. It dwells in the sea". The identical illustration of the ling (鯪魚) opposite giant crab is reproduced by Fujisawa. A rather different four-legged fish occurs in an illustrated 1667 edition of Guo Pu's annotations Cf. zh:陵魚.) as is the renyu (人魚, "human fish") aka tiyu (䱱魚; Japanese:teigyo) (Note: Shan hai jing, illustration and caption for "Human-fish (Renyu) 人魚, translated by Strassberg, excerpt: "They resemble catfish with four legs and make a sound like a baby 以鮎而四足、聲如小兒啼". The tiyu alias is lacking in Strassberg, but is found in the corresponding Chinese paragraph quoted in by Fujisawa. The tiyu and renyu human-fish are also given as synonymous in Bencao Gangmu.) and it was the Japanese Wakan sansai zue ("Illustrated Sino-Japanese [Encyclopedia] of the Three Realms", 1712) which for some reason altered the image of the ningyo/renyu 人魚 (aka ryōgyo/lingyu 鯪魚) into a two-armed but legless mermaid. (Note: Fujisawa states: "Sansai zue gives this as two-handed/armed and legless 「三才圖會」 には之を二手無足に記してゐる".Fujisawa (1925), pp. 24–25 It is assumed shorthand for Wakan sansai zue is meant here, rather than the Sancai Tuhui (1609), since the latter seems to lack an entry for lingyu, and its entry for renyu depicts a carp-like fish with four feet. (Note: The text reads it resembles the fei 𩵥 (whereas Shan hai ing says catfish 鮎). The definition of fei is elusive; according to Japanese sources it is one of the vulgar characters for the carp order (cypriniform) ugui (big-scaled redfin).))

A different commentator also regards the pictorialization of the ningyo in Wakan sansai zue to be an "addition.. with an illustration.. much like the Western idea of a mermaid". (Note: Nathaniel Kingdon's paper, which discusses natural history scholarship in Korea by the brothers Jeong Yakjeon 丁若銓 and Jeong Yakjong.)

=== Chinese vs. Western sources ===
As to the knowledge people held about the ningyo during the Edo Period, the influence of Classical Chinese literature is palpable. Even Kyōden's Hakoiri musume reveals the writer's literacy, as the work discusses the distinction between the teigyo (Chinese: tiyu) and the geigyo (Chinese:niyu, 鯢魚).

Japanese scholars writing on the ningyo drew much from Chinese sources, for example, the Bencao Gangmu (1596), the compendium of Chinese materia medica, which was introduced into Japan in 1607, and was frequently quoted on the subject of the mermaid. (Note: Bencao Gangmu is used by Gentaku (cf. infra), and also excerpted more extensively in Wakan sansai zue (1712) and also used by Ono Ranzan's Honzō kōmoku keimō (1803).) Thus Kaibara Ekiken (1709) cited it, and distinguishes the teigyo ("ningyo" in small print) from the geigyo ("salamander").

==== Ningyo in Wakan sansai zue ====
The influential Wakan sansai zue was modeled after the Three Realms encyclopedia (Sancai Tuhui, 1609) of China, and also drew from such Chinese material on the topic of ningyo. But as already noted the image of the ningyo was not faithful to Chinese sources. The work also equates the ningyo with the ryōgyo (鯪魚) (Chinese: 鯪魚/陵魚, but this synonymy is based on the gloss in the Japanese lexicon Wamyō Ruijushō, not Chinese sources.

==== Peixe muller or heishimureru ====
The popular encyclopedia Wakan sansai zue also describes the medical use of peixe muller (in Spanish or Portuguese; Japanese transliteration: heishmure[ru], "woman fish"). The sources were Dutch or Chinese, which was the only foreign languages allowed to be studied during the isolation period of the Tokugawa shogunate. The Wakan sansai zue its claim that the woman-fish bones works as a detoxicant differs from known accounts, and stymies identification of any possible source. (Note: Wakan sansai zue states "In Holland, the ningyo bone heishimure 倍以之牟礼 is considered a detoxicant and its effect is splendid".)

Japanese scholars could also have accessed information that Europeans wrote in Chinese. Thus Ferdinand Verbiest (aka Nan Huairen) in 1672 (Note: In his work Kunyu tushuo (坤輿圖說, "Illustrated explanation of the world", Peking, 1672)) wrote in Chinese that for the siren, (Note: xī léng (西楞) being the Chinese character phoneticization used for "siren".) "The female bones work even better (to stem [the bleeding of] blood diseases)". (Note: "其骨能止血病女魚更效) This is clearly restated from naturalist Jonston (1657) earlier. (Note: Jonston (オランダ訳原文): "De beenders van dese visch hebben groote kracht om't bloed te stoppen, en an te trekken, men heest gezien datse het lopende bloed zo stildden, gelijk of de ader was gebonden: Nochtans zijn die van de Vrouwen oft Meermin veel krachtiger, en uit die dese, welke met plekken, na't swart hellende, gevlekt zijn". Jongh: "the bones of this fish are extremely powerful agents for reducing or increasing the flow of blood : and those of the Women or mermaids are stronger yet") But Gentaku (cf. § Ōtsuki Gentaku) while supplying an abriged translation from Jonston, curtailed the mention of female bones being advertised as better medicine.

A number of other Japanese scholarship on the ningyo also discussed the supposed siren-mermaid bones being trafficked by the Europeans as heishimureru (Spanish/Portuguese: peixe mulher; Galician: peixe muller, 'woman fish') (Note: The term is given as Spanish by Ōtsuki Gentaku; The Spaniard Domingo Fernández Navarrete gives "pexemulier". However Castiglioni (2021), n19 and Chaiklin (2010), n49 venture that peixe mulher is more likely Portuguese.) One identifiable source was the Flemish Jesuit Verbiest aka Nan Huairen (mid-17c.) who wrote in Chinese, cited Ono Ranzan (1803), and possibly even used earlier by Kaibara Ekiken (1709), to describe the effects of the peixe muller medicine. (Note: The heishimureru is ascribed effectiveness against geketsu (下血, rectal bleeding: melena) by both Kaibara Ekiken (1709) and Ono Ranzan (1803) Ekiken's source is unclear, but Ranzan discloses his source to be Kunyu waiji (坤輿外紀, "Illustrated explanation of the world", Peking, 1672), written by Verbiest.)

==== Ōtsuki Gentaku ====
In the interim, many other European works referring to the siren-mermaid were introduced to the Japanese literati: Johannes Jonston (Latin 1657, Dutch tr. 1660), Ambrose Paré (Œuvres, 1575; Dutch tr. 1593), and François Valentyn (1724–26, in Dutch), thanks to the efforts of Ōtsuki Gentaku's Rokumotsu shinshi (六物新志; 'New Treatise on Six Things', 1786), who gave translated digests from these works, accompanied by reproductions of siren-mermaid illustrations. And this endeavor was instrumental in forging the image/iconography of the ningyo during the era that was influenced by the European siren-mermaid.

=== Mummies or Feejee mermaids ===
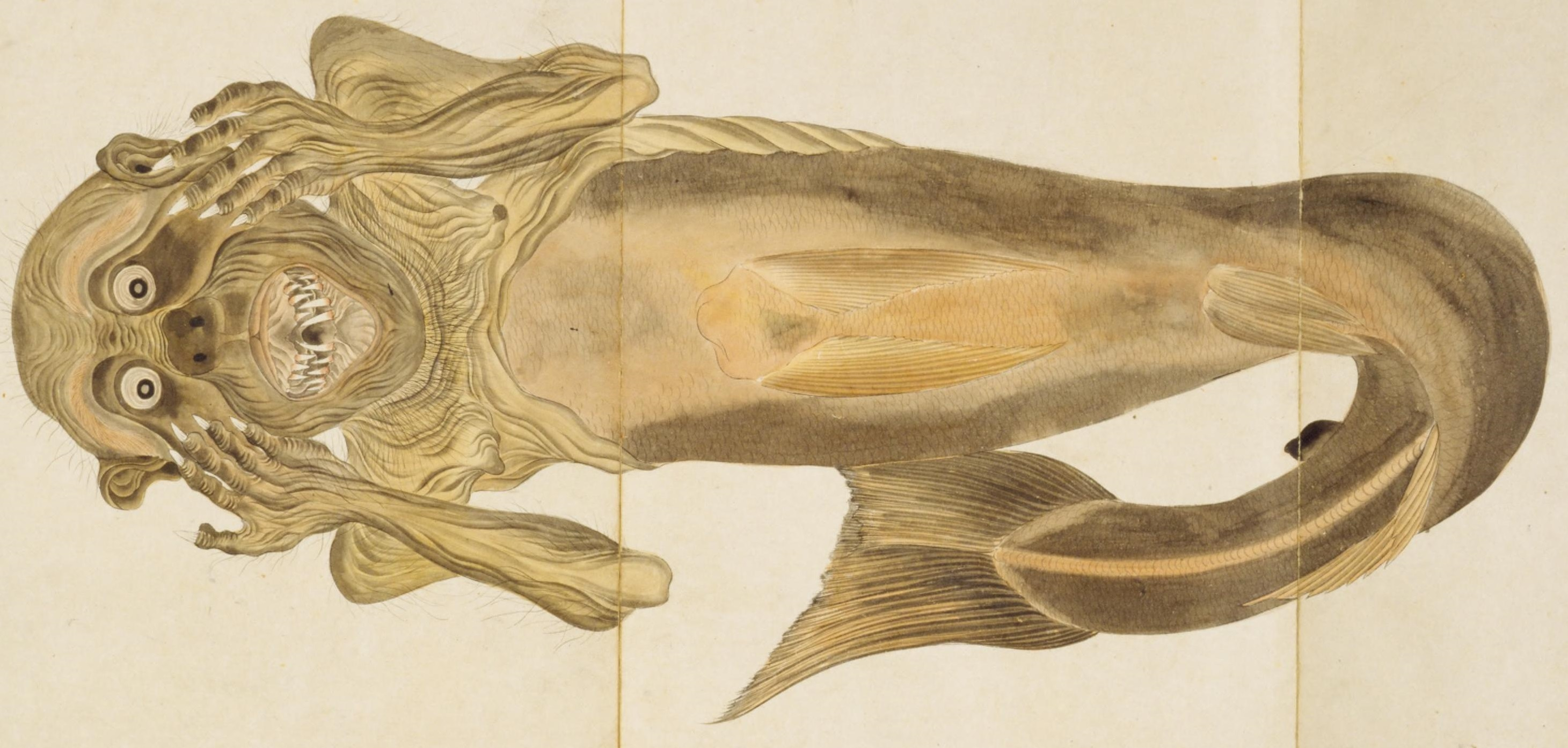
A ningyo mummy (front view), hand painted —Baien gyofu

Specimens of taxidermically crafted ningyo have been observed and illustrated during the Edo Period, including the painting in ''Baien gyofu (cf. below) and the sketch by natural historian Matsumori Taneyasu dated Ansei 3/1856.

==== Baien gyofu ====
Mōri Baien's Baien gyofu (梅園魚譜, 'Baien's catalog of fishes', Bunsei 8/1825) contains a full-color hand-painted illustrations of a ningyo in frontal and side views. This has been determined to represent a so-called "stuffed" ningyo crafted by joining the tail-end of a fish, also called a Feejee mermaid in the West.

== In popular culture ==
- Fishmen (魚人, Gyojin), often incorrectly referred to as Mermen, are a race who appear throughout the entire anime/manga series of One Piece on a regular basis. They look like humans with fish features and are obviously inspired by the ningyo. Fishman is written like ningyo but with the characters switched (人魚, Ningyo -> 魚人, Gyojin). Merfolk (人魚, Ningyo) appear in the series too. These are more peaceful of nature than the Fishmen and, like the mermaids and mermen of folklore, their upper half is that of a human while the lower half is that of a fish, though male Merfolk are somewhat uncommon.
- The manga/anime series Mermaid Saga by Rumiko Takahashi is based on the Yao Bikuni myth, in which the main characters become immortal by consuming the flesh of a mermaid.
- There is a fake "ningyo" in the National Museum of Ethnology.
- The character Serilly from the Puyo Puyo series of games is a lonely ningyo who desires to make friends, but is often paranoid that everyone who approaches her wants to eat her.
- In Okinawa, people have believed that eating ningyo would be unlucky. They also do not eat dugong.
- The character "Ponyo" in the film of the same name is a ningyo or "human-faced fish".
- The primary antagonist of the video game Siren is based on the character Yao Bikuni, and the background of the story is loosely based on the Yao Bikuni legend.
- The 2010 Super Sentai series, Tensou Sentai Goseiger featured the antagonistic cryptid-themed monster group Yuumajuu. One of their members is Jogon of the Ningyo, who has the secondary theme of silverfish.
- The CCG and roleplaying game Legend of the Five Rings has ningyo characters as members of the Mantis Clan.
- The video game Mermaid Swamp is based on the myth of Yao Bikuni and the ningyo myth.
- A host of ningyo characters feature prominently in the manga and anime series Namiuchigiwa no Muromi-san.
- In Yo-kai Watch, Ningyo appears where its English dub name is Mermaidyn. She is depicted as a mermaid who is constantly caught on the hook of Nate Adams' fishing pole much to his annoyance. Yao Bikuni also appears as Mermadonna, who is Mermaidyn's evolved form.
- Bikuni appears in the anime Konohana Kitan as a secondary character.
- The film Lu Over the Wall revolves around an idiosyncratic interpretation of ningyo in which they can manipulate water and turn humans into immortal ningyo by biting them.
- Yaobikuni is a playable character in the mobile RPG Onmyōji.
- Yaobikuni is a character in the manga series Blade of the Immortal.
- Mermaid, a short film by Osamu Tezuka released on September 21, 1964. In a fictional place where using the imagination is banned, a boy saves a fish, which surprises everyone by turning into a mermaid and playing with him. The boy is arrested for imagining this "nonsense", and is robbed of his imagination as punishment. However, he regains this ability and turns himself into a mermaid, so they happily leave forever that totalitarian society to live their eternal love alone in the deep abyss.
- In episode 15 of Vampire Princess Miyu, the action presents a ningyo and a Yao Bikuni as well, where the protagonist (a Vampire) kills the ningyo which is discovered to be a Shinma. The protagonist ignores Yao Bikuni's plea to make her live eternal happy dreams until the end of her life and instead lets her live the next 100 years to experience human suffering.
- In the PC game Return of the Obra Dinn, three Ningyos are captured and held captive by the crew of the ship, causing spider crabs (another Japanese game culture reference) and a giant kraken to attack in retaliation, resulting in the death of several crew members.
- In the PC game Sekiro: Shadows Die Twice, there are 3 Ningyos: one dead at the bottom of the fountainhead palace lake, one alive in the fountainhead palace lake and the Dragon is officially titled in the native Japanese version 'Ningyo Dragon'. There is also an incarnation of Yao Bikuni who is the True/Corrupted Monk whose official title in the native Japanese version of the game is 'Princess Yao'. The game writers directly drew the connection via demonstrating that a parasitic bug that existed in the Ningyo was the reason for the immortality, and this parasite is the cause of the True/Corrupted Monks immortality as well as a significant amount of others in the game.
- In the mobile game Fate/Grand Order, the character Sessyoin Kiara obtains a mermaid-like appearance and powers after having eaten Yao Bikuni.
- The manga/anime series This Monster Wants to Eat Me by Sai Naekawa features a mermaid as the titular character who meets a suicidal teenage girl named Hinako Yaotose. Disguising herself as a human named Shiori Oumi, she starts a friendship with Hinako after revealing her secret and promising to end Hinako's life by devouring her when her flesh is at its most delicious.
- The videogame Paranormasight: The Mermaid's Curse features ningyo extensively, with multiple characters becoming immortal after eating their flesh. This includes Sato Shiranami, the true identity of Yao Bikuni, as well as the game's protagonist, Yuza Minakuchi.

== See also ==
- Amabie
- Fiji mermaid
- Jenny Haniver
