= Matsuoka Shoan =

Japanese Confucianist and herbalist

Matsuoka Shoan 松岡 恕庵
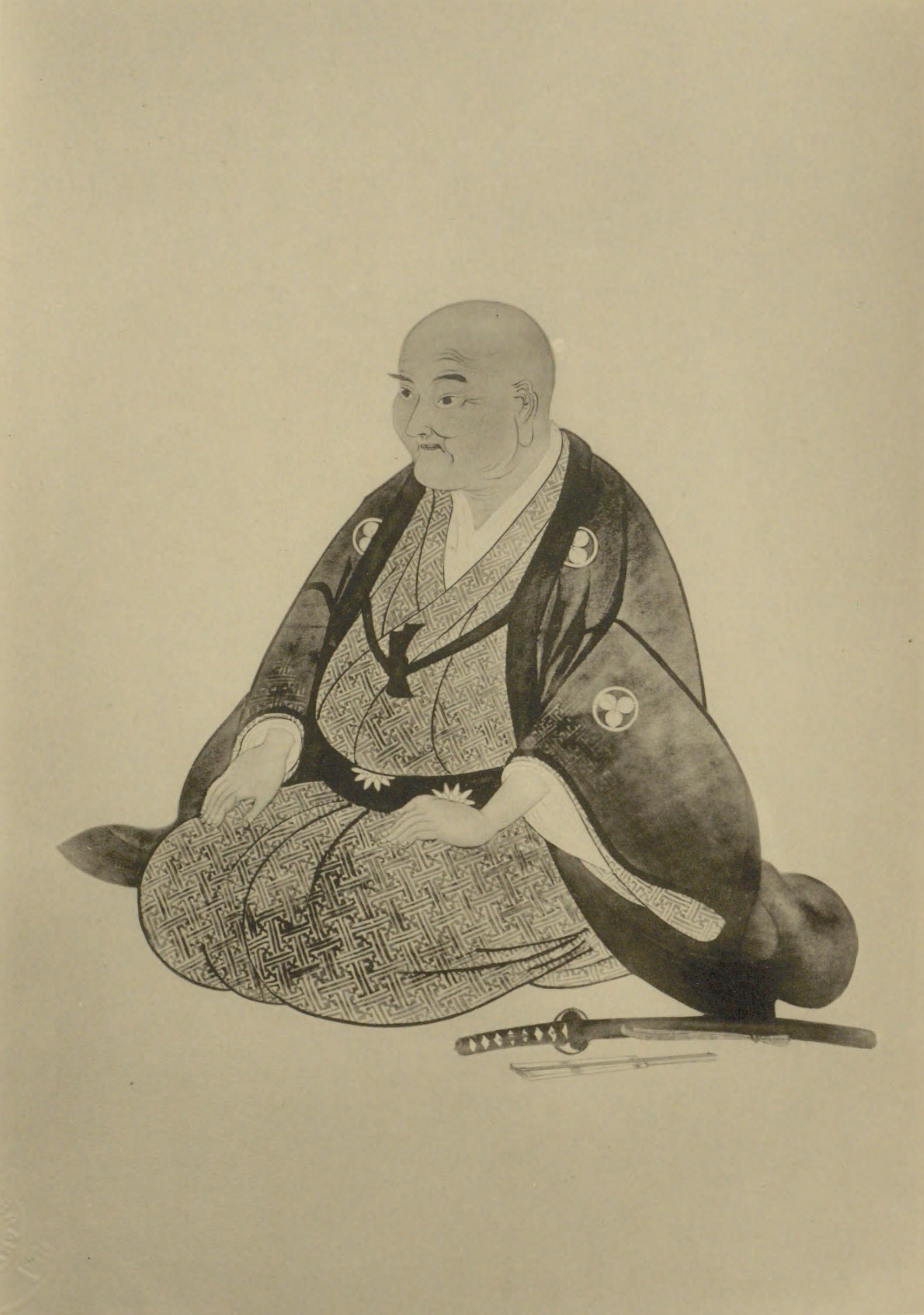
- Born: 1668; Kyoto, Japan
- Died: July 11, 1746 (aged 79 years)
- Other names: Gentatsu (玄達)

Philosophical work
- Era: Edo period
- School: Nangaku
- Main interests: Neo-Confucianism, Kampo

Matsuoka Shoan (松岡 恕庵; 1668-1746) was an Edo era Japanese Confucianist and herbalist.

== Biography ==
Matsuoka was born in Kyoto in Kanbun 8 as Matsuoka Gentatsu (玄達). As an adult, he adopted the name Matsuoka Shoan. He studied philosophy under Yamazaki Ansai and Itō Jinsai, and medicine under Wakasui Inoue.

When Tokugawa Yoshimune became the 8th Shōgun of Japan in 1716, the Shogunate set out to institute an array of economic and cultural reforms in Japan, including the development of herbal studies in the capitol at Edo. Matsuoka would be invited by the Shogunate to continue his studies at the Edo Medical Center, and join Wakaku Kaisho, a private company that conducted pharmaceutical experiments with collected herbs, and developed a commercial pharmaceutical practice for distributing necessary medication to the growing populace. Matsuoka was one of the first Japanese scholars to write a monograph (蕃藷録, "On Sweet Potatoes") dedicated to the analysis of sweet potatoes as a crop.

Matsuoka was a prolific writer and teacher during his time, opening his own school and mentored noted Edo era doctors and scholars Niwa Masahide, Minami Asai, Ono Ranzan, Tanikawa Kotosuga, and Toda Asahiyama. His research of the species, forms, and production of animals and plants lead to great strides in the understanding of herbology and influenced pharmaceutical knowledge throughout East Asia.

== Bibliography ==
• 救荒本草 - Wild Foods
• 用薬須知 - Early Chinese Medicine
• 食療正要 - Essentials of Food Medicine
• 蕃藷録 - Sweet Potatoes
• 烟草録 - Tobacco
• 広参品 - Ginsing
• 怡顔斎何品 - What is Pharmacology
- 櫻品 - Cherry Blossom
- 梅品 - Plums
- 蘭品 - Orchids
- 竹品 - Bamboo
- 菓品 - Fruit
- 菜品 - Vegetables
- 菌品 - Fungus
- 介品 - Mollusks
- 石品 - Minerals
• 用薬須知後編 - Early Chinese Medicine, Vol 2
