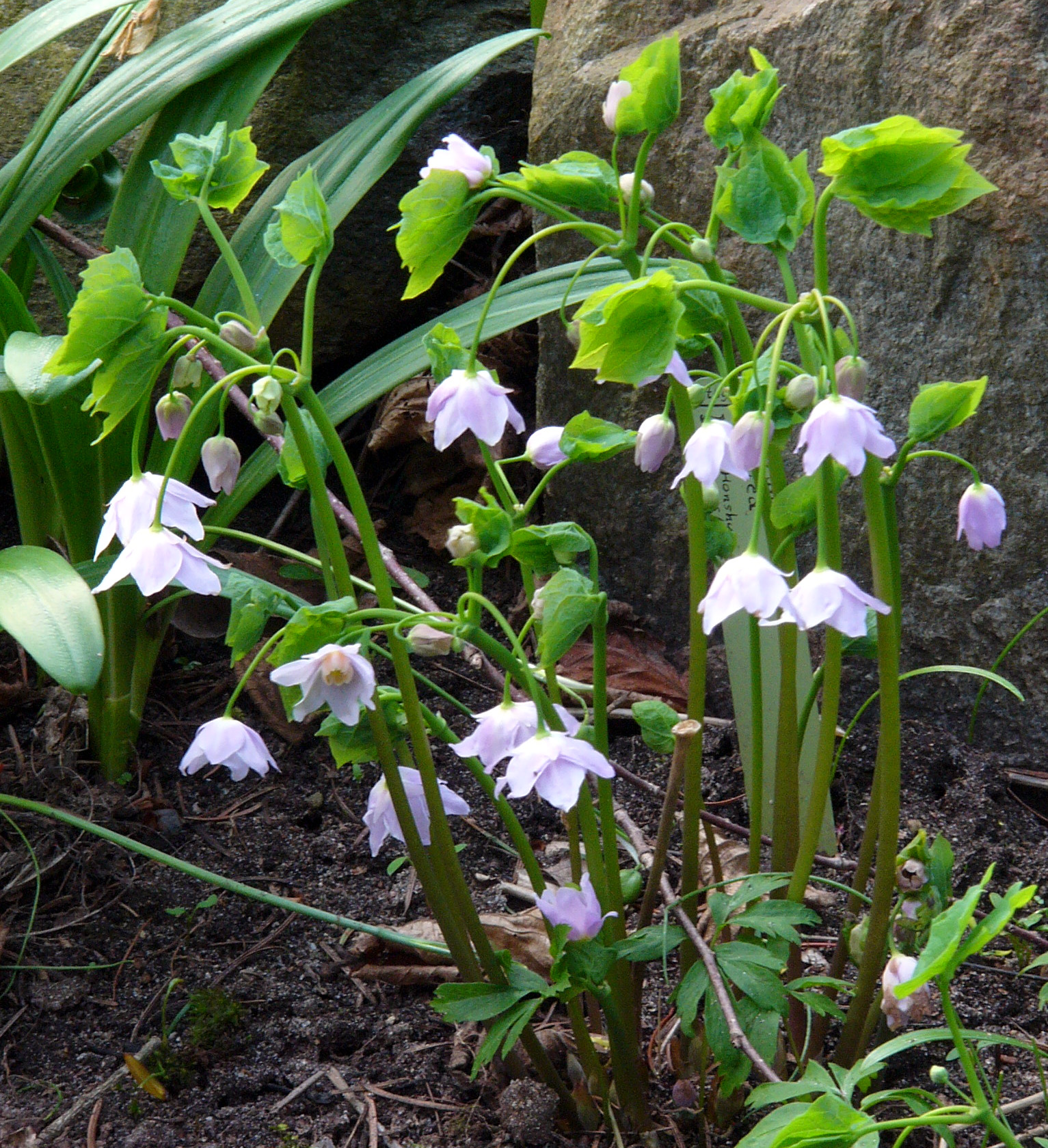

Scientific classification
- Kingdom: Plantae
- Clade: Tracheophytes
- Clade: Angiosperms
- Clade: Eudicots
- Order: Ranunculales
- Family: Berberidaceae
- Genus: Ranzania; T.Ito
- Species: R. japonica

Binomial name
- Ranzania japonica T.Ito

Synonyms
- Podophyllum japonicum T. Itô ex Maxim.

= Ranzania japonica =

Genus of flowering plants belonging to the barberry family

Ranzania (トガクシソウ, Togakushisou) is a monotypic genus of perennial herbs in the family Berberidaceae. The only species is Ranzania japonica. It is native to woodlands in the mountains of Honshu, Japan. This genus is named in honor of Ono Ranzan, who has been called "the Japanese Linnaeus". Fleshy stems of Ranzania form small colonies from an underground rhizome. Each stem bears two trifoliate compound leaves, and between the leaves is a single or more commonly a small cluster of drooping cup-shaped mauve flowers. These develop into an upright cluster of white berries. The haploid chromosome number is n=7.

== Uses ==
It is occasionally used in shade gardens in the west.

== Taxonomy ==
The taxonomy of this plant has changed a fair amount. It was once placed in family Ranzaniaceae Takht. and also combined into genus Podophyllum.

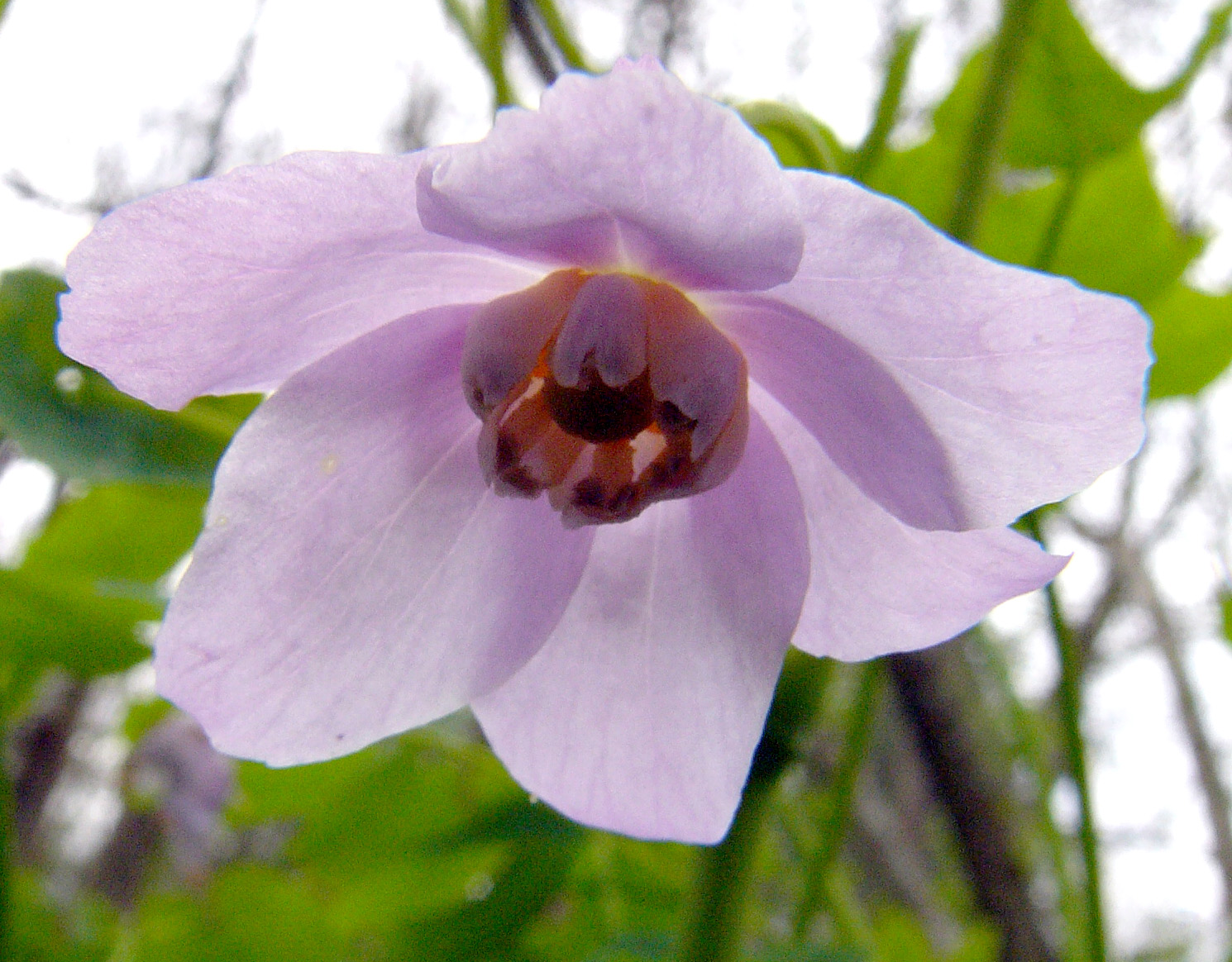
Close-up of flowers

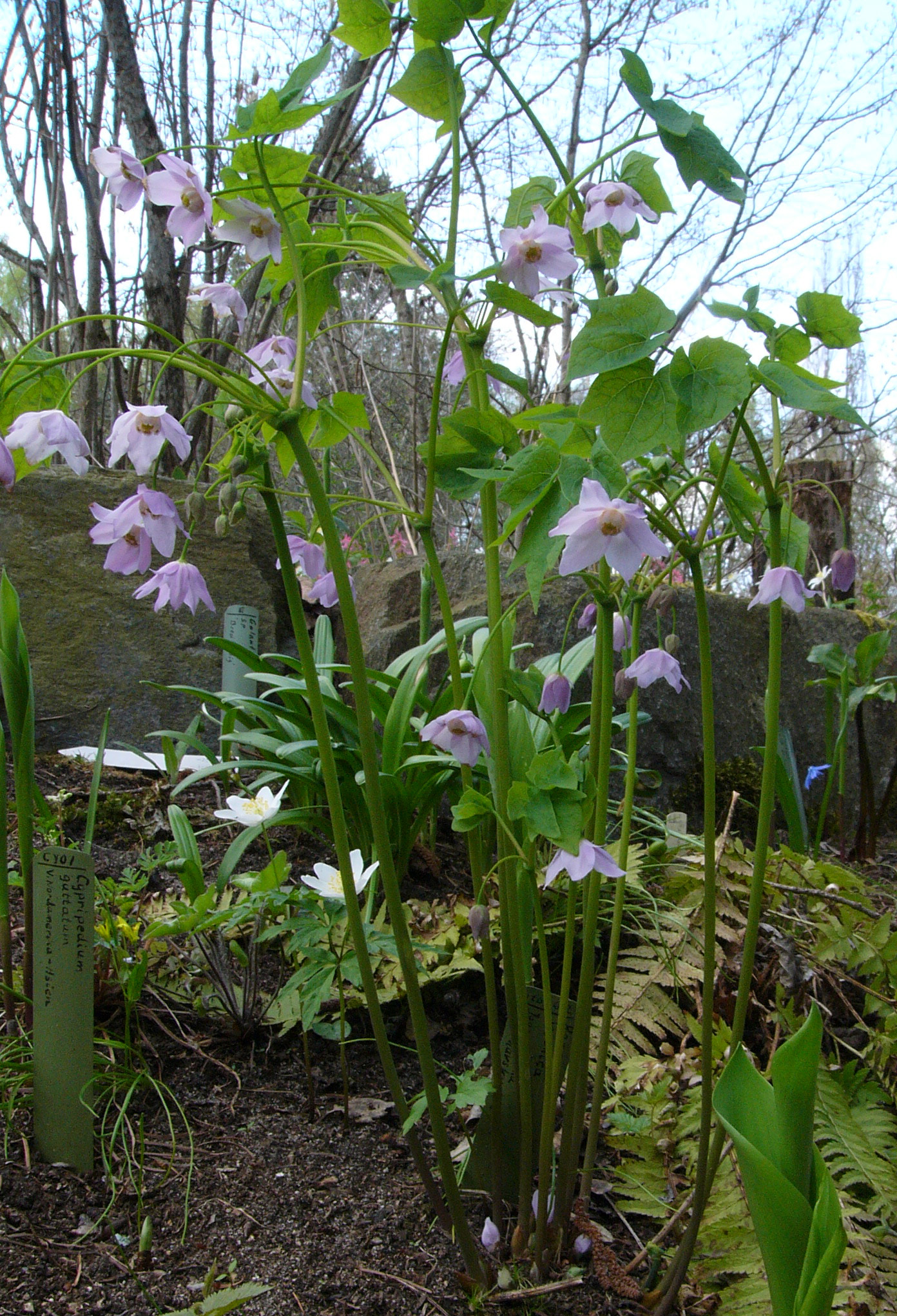
Ranzania japonica growing in a shade garden in Sweden
