= Mōri Baien =

Japanese botanist and naturalist (1798–1851)

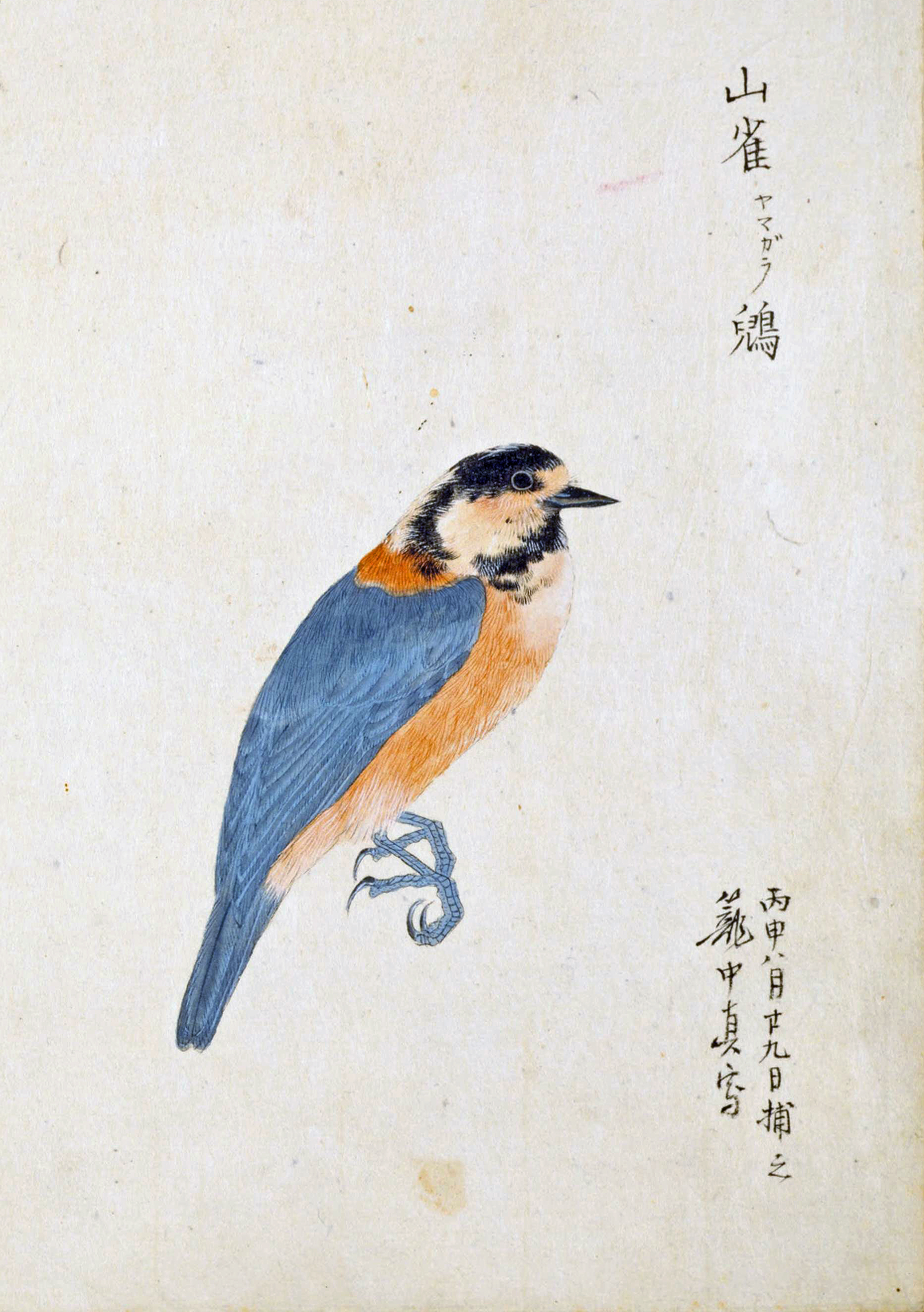
Varied tit (Sittiparus varius) from Baien Kinpu (梅園禽譜) (1839)

Mōri Baien (毛利梅園) (1798–1851) was a Japanese samurai and naturalist of the late Edo period. His given name was Motohisa (元寿). He is known for his accurately illustrated works on the flora and fauna of Japan, which include the multi-volume Baien Sōmokuka-fu (梅園草木花譜).

== See also ==
- Ono Ranzan
