= Johannes a Leydis =

15th century Dutch chronicler

Johannes a Leydis or Jan Gerbrandszoon van Leiden was a Dutch chronicler from the 15th century. A Leydis died in 1504.

== Life ==
Not much is known with certainty about Johannes a Leydis' life. In all likelihood he came from a family of poorters (a special type of citizenship) from Leiden. He entered the carmelite monastery in Haarlem before 1455. In 1476 he was named prior of the monastery, but in 1479 we find him as prior of the monastery at Woudsend in Friesland. It seems that, during the struggles between the Vetkopers and Schieringers, discipline had become lax in the monastery. A Leydis attempted to reform the monastery, but apparently encountered so much resistance to his reforms that he was forced to leave in 1480. From sources we know that A Leydis was back in the monastery in Haarlem in 1495, filling the function of subprior. A Leydis died in 1504 in Haarlem.

During the Hook and Cod wars, A Leydis supported the Hook faction. His sympathies lay in particular with the family van Brederode and the Egmond Abbey.

== Historical work ==
Johannes a Leydis is mostly known as a historian. He wrote the following works:

- Chronicon comitum Hollandiae et episcoporum Ultraiectensium, a chronicle of the counts of Holland and the bishops of Utrecht. The first edition of the work is known only from manuscripts and was written between 1467 and 1469. The second edition, begun between 1485 and 1494, was printed in 1620 in Frankfurt by Franciscus Sweertius.
- Opusculum de gestis regalium abbatum monasterii sancti Athalberti ordinis sancti Benedicti in Egmonda, a chronicle of the abbots of Egmond. Written between 1477 and 1484, commissioned by abt Nicolaus van Adrichem. Published by Antonius Matthaeus III.
- Cronica illustrium dominorum de Brederueden, a chronicle of the lords of Brederode. Written between 1483 and 1486. There is also a middle Dutch version of this chronicle. The relation between the two versions is unclear.

The work of Johannes a Leydis was well known in the first half of the 16th century, and was used as a source by early humanist historians like Cornelius Aurelius and Reinier Snoy. Later on, the tendency of A Leydis to include fantastic stories in his work was criticised, with the harshest criticism coming from Janus Dousa.

== Secondary literature and other sources ==
- Romein, J.M. (1932) Geschiedenis van de Noord-Nederlandsche geschiedschrĳving in de Middeleeuwen. Bĳdrage tot de beschavingsgeschiedenis, Tjeenk Willink (Haarlem)
- Roefs, V.J.G. (1942) De Egmondsche abtenkroniek van Iohannes a Leydis O.Carm., Alberts (Sittard). Contains a good biography on A Leydis, as well as a version of the Egmond Abbey chronicle.
- Alberts, W.J., Rutgers, C.A. (1957) Johannes a Leydis. Cronica illustrium dominorum de Brederueden (Fontes minores medii aevi 5-6), Wolters (Groningen). A version of the chronicle of the lords of Brederode
- Ebels-Hoving, B. (1985) ‘Johannes a Leydis en de eerste humanistische geschiedschrijving van Holland’, in: Bijdragen en mededelingen betreffende de geschiedenis der Nederlanden 100, 26-51
- Narrative Sources database
