= Kaibara Ekken =

Japanese Confucianist Philosopher, Pre-Linnaean botanist

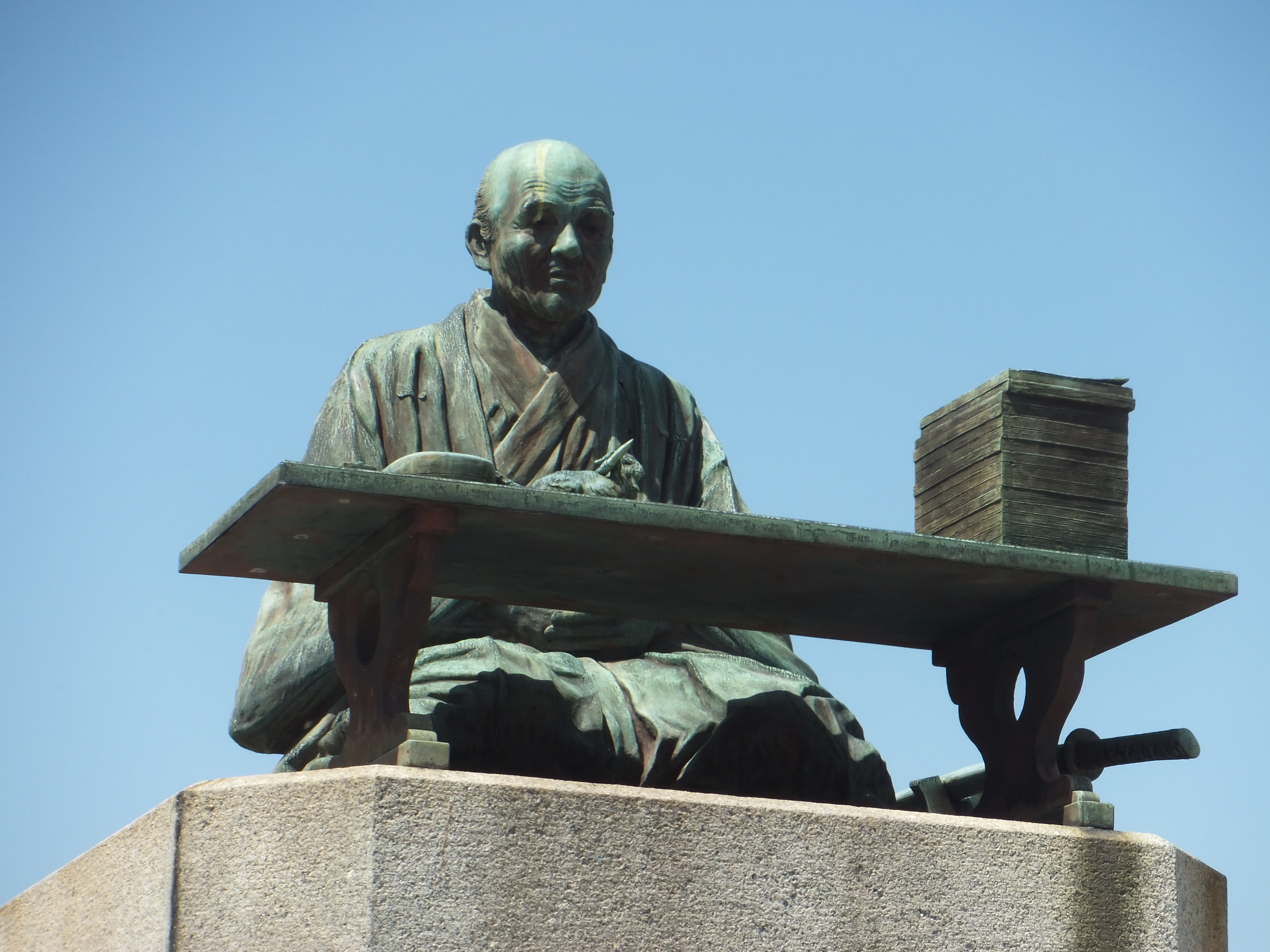
Bronze Statue of Kaibara Ekken at his gravesite (Kinryū-Temple, Fukuoka-City, Japan)

Kaibara Ekken (貝原 益軒; December 17, 1630 – October 5, 1714) or Ekiken, also known as Atsunobu (篤信), was a Japanese Neo-Confucianist philosopher and botanist.

Kaibara was born into a family of advisors to the daimyō of Fukuoka Domain in Chikuzen Province (modern-day Fukuoka Prefecture). He accompanied his father to Edo in 1648, and was sent in 1649 to Nagasaki to study Western science. At his father's urging, he continued his studies in Nagasaki as a rōnin from 1650 through 1656. He then re-entered service to Kuroda, which led to his continuing studies in Kyoto. After his father's death in 1665, he returned to Fukuoka.

Kaibara's two most significant contributions to Japanese culture were the study of nature based on a blend of Western natural science and Neo-Confucianism, and the translation of the complex writings of Neo-Confucianism into vernacular Japanese. His synthesis of Confucian ideas and Western science influence the formation of Shinto, especially State Shinto, and reflect similar concerns to the Kokugaku movement.

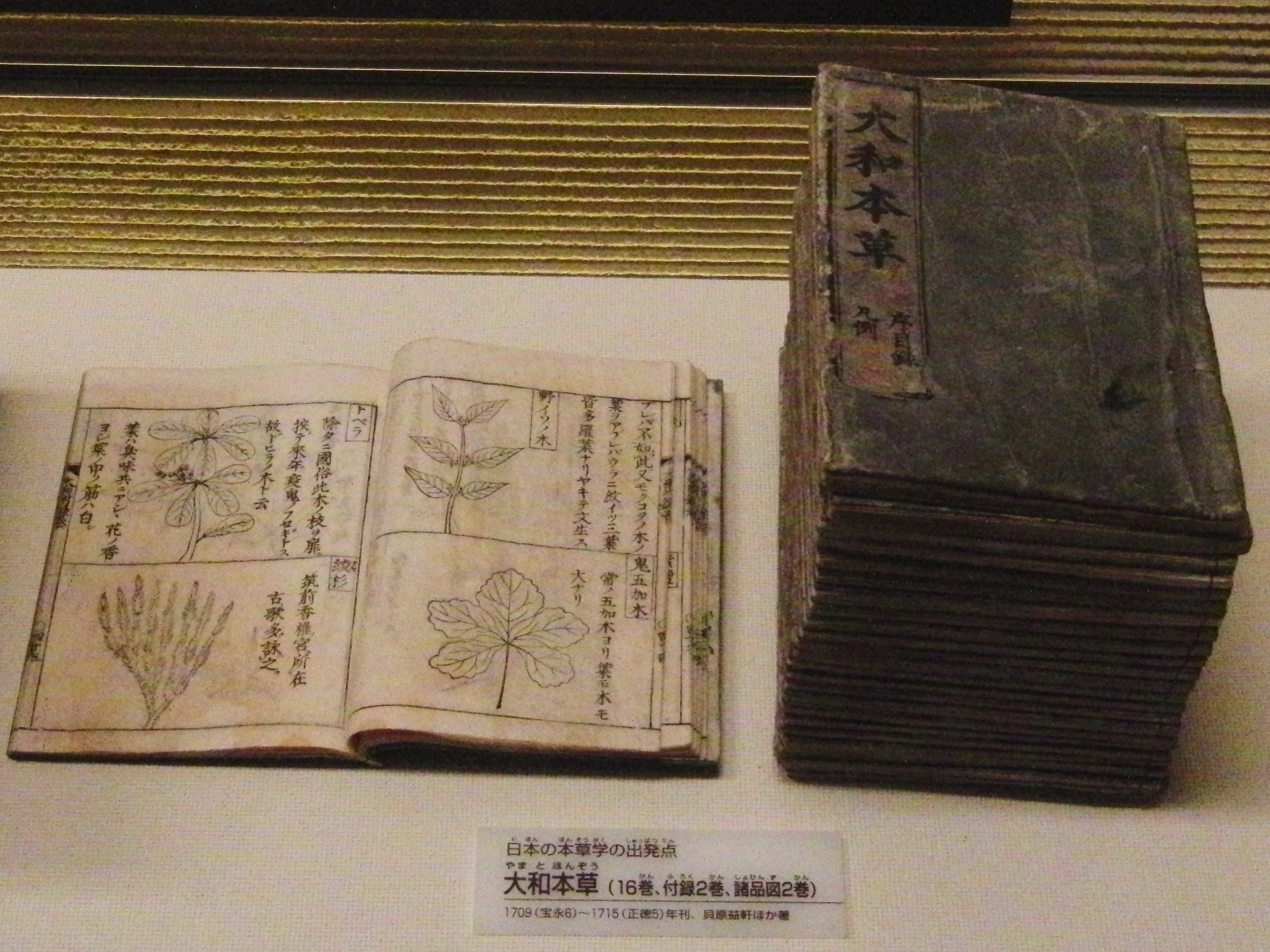
Yamato honzō. Book of botany written by Kaibara Ekken in 1709. Exhibit in the National Museum of Nature and Science, Tokyo, Japan.

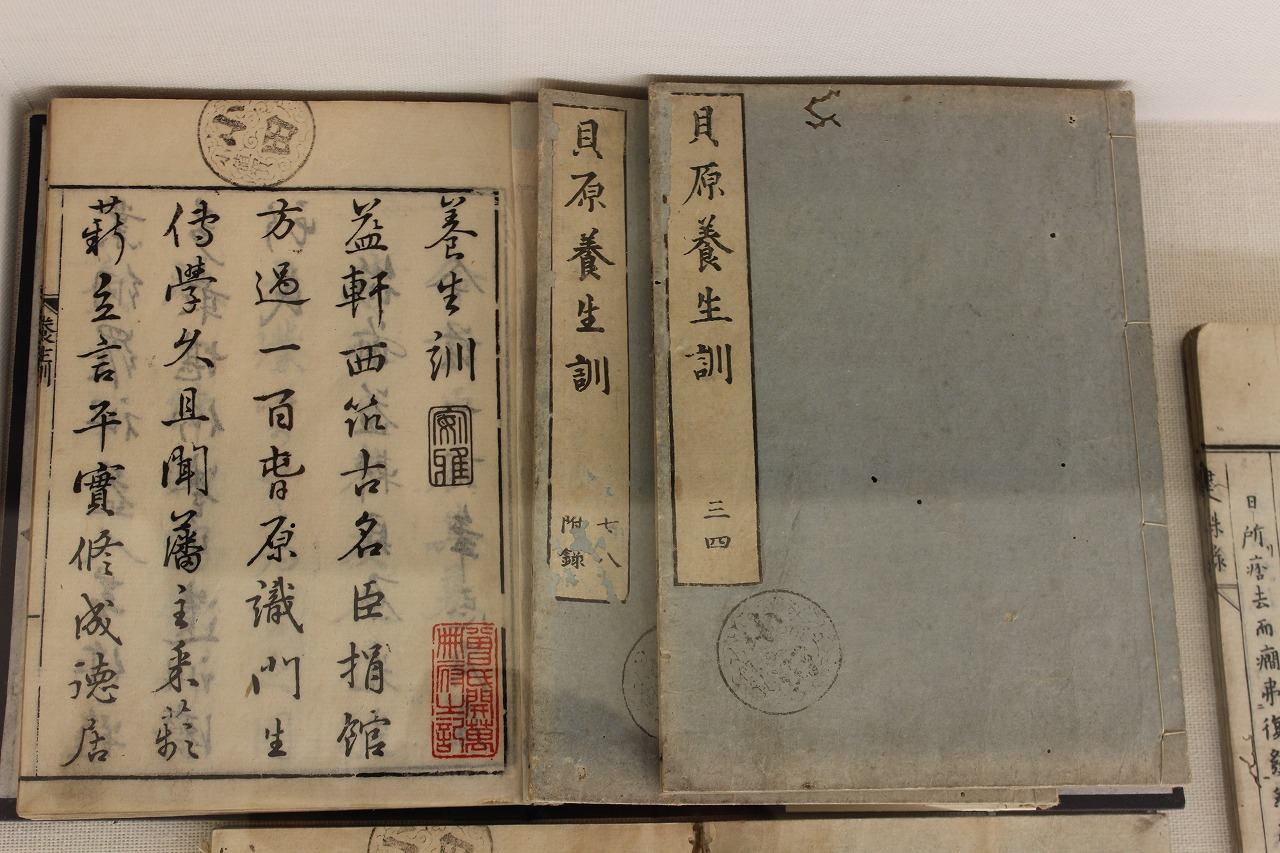
Yōjōkun. Book of healthy way written by Kaibara Ekken in 1713.

Kaibara's science was confined to Botany and Materia medica and focused on the "natural law". Kaibara became as famous in Japan as people such as Charles Darwin when it came to science. He advanced the study of botany in Japan when he wrote Yamato honzō (Medicinal herbs of Japan), which was a seminal study of Japanese plants. The 19th-century German Japanologist Philipp Franz von Siebold called him the "Aristotle of Japan".

Kaibara was known for his manuals of behavior, such as changing his Confucian ethical system based on the teachings of Zhu Xi (also known as Chu Hsi) into an easy "self-help" manuals. As an educator and philosopher, it appears that Kaibara's main goal in life was to further the process of weaving Neo-Confucianism into Japanese culture. In this context, he is best known for such books as Precepts for Children and Greater Learning for Women (Onna daigaku); but modern scholarship argues that it was actually prepared by other hands. Although the genesis of the work remains unchallenged, the oldest extant copy (1733) ends with the lines "as related by our teacher Ekiken Kaibara" and the publisher's colophon states that the text was written from lectures of our teacher Kaibara."

== Published works ==
- Dazaifu jinja engi (History of Dazaifu Shrine).
- Jingikun (Lessons of the Deities).
- Onna daigaku (Greater Learning for Women), c. 1729.
- Shinju heikō aimotorazaru ron (Treatise on the Non-Divergence of Shintō and Confucianism).
- Yamato honzō (Medicinal herbs of Japan), 1709.
- Yamato sōhon (Grasses of Japan).
- Yōjōkun (The Book of Life-nourishing Principles), 1713.
- Taigiroku (The Record of Great Doubts), posthumously published in 1714.

== See also ==
- Confucian Shinto
