= Ono Ranzan =

Japanese botanist (1729–1810)

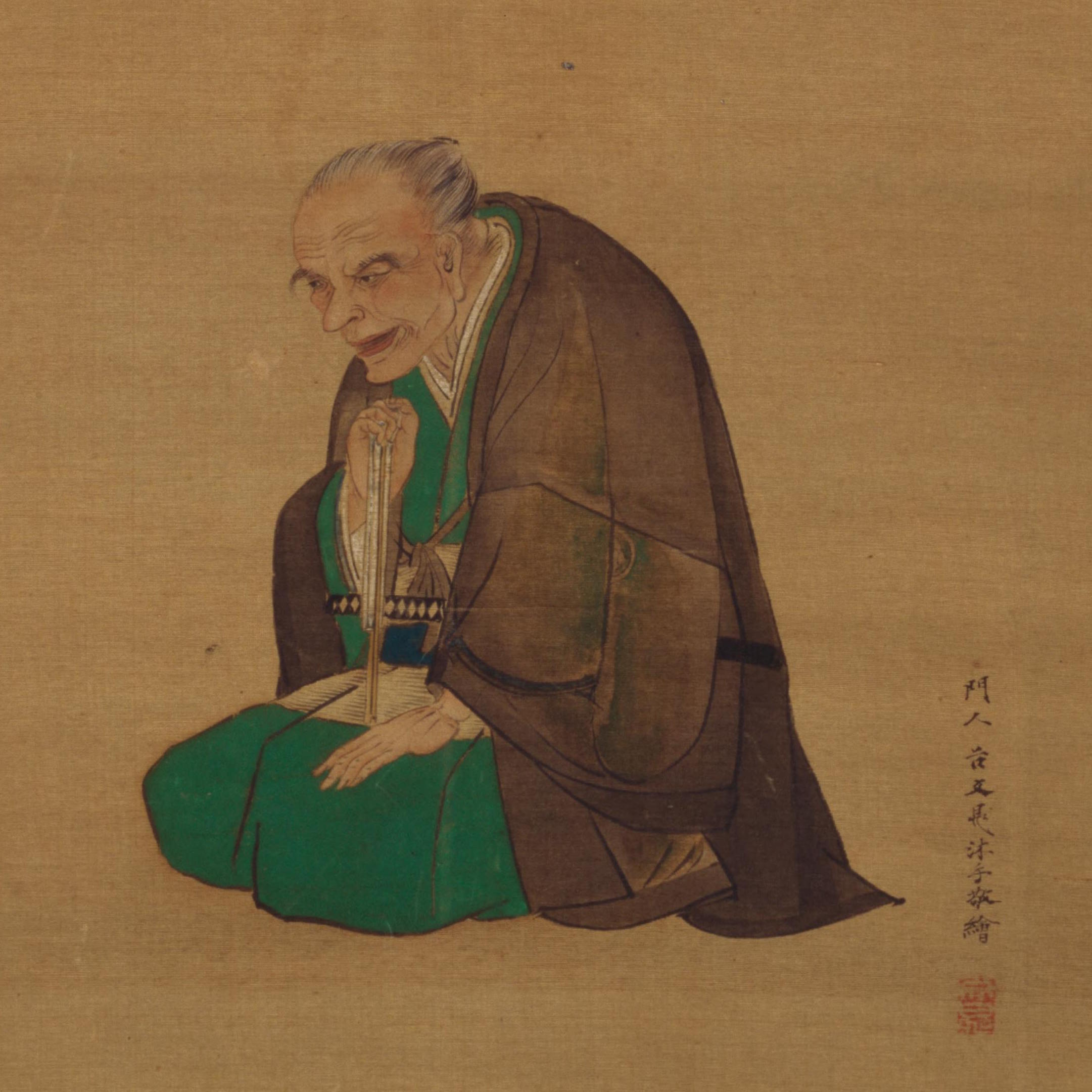
1810 portrait of Ono by Tani Bunchō

Ono Motohiro (小野職博; 1729–1810), also known as Ono Ranzan (小野蘭山), was a Japanese botanist and herbalist, known as the "Japanese Linnaeus".

Ono's real surname was Saeki (佐伯); his adult given name was Motohiro (職博). Ranzan (蘭山) became his art name and Ibun (以文) his Chinese style courtesy name.

He was born in Kyoto to a courtly family, and studied in his youth under Matsuoka Shoan. In 1754, he opened a school of botanical pharmacology (pharmacognosy) which enjoyed considerable success, with over a thousand pupils enrolling.

One student who studied under Ono at this time was Kimura Kenkadō. In 1799, he was given a post at the Seijūkan, the country's major government medical school in Edo. Here he worked extensively on a translation into Japanese of Rembert Dodoens' herbal guide, the Cruydeboeck. Ono was familiar with Western herbalism (making use of the work of Johann Wilhelm Weinmann in his translation) and had studied both traditional Chinese medicine and Western medicine as well. Some of Ono's own works on Japanese botany were translated by the French botanist Ludovic Savatier.

In the early years of the nineteenth century, Ono travelled around Japan gathering information on botanical remedies, which culminated in his most important literary work, the Honzō Kōmoku Keimō (本草綱目啓蒙; "Dictated Compendium of Materia Medica"), which was edited by his botanist grandson Ono Mototaka, and first published in 1803–1806. It was a piece on natural history espousing viewpoints independent from China's Honzō Kōmoku (the Bencao Gangmu). Despite Ono's knowledge of Western and Chinese botany, this was one of the first books in the Japanese natural sciences to advocate experimentation and research rather than reliance on the Chinese Classics. He also co-authored the floral work Kai 花彙. Ono never married, but fathered a son with one of his household servants.

After his death in 1810 he was interred at Asakusa; however, his remains were moved to Nerima in 1927 after the graveyard was damaged in the Great Kantō earthquake. The barberry species Ranzania japonica was named in his honour.

== Editions ==
- Ono, Ranzan (1844), Ono, Mototaka (ed.), Jūshū honzō kōmoku keimō (in 35 vols.) 重修本草綱目啓蒙, Hishiya Kichibē
