= Umibōzu =

Yōkai sea monster in Japanese folklore

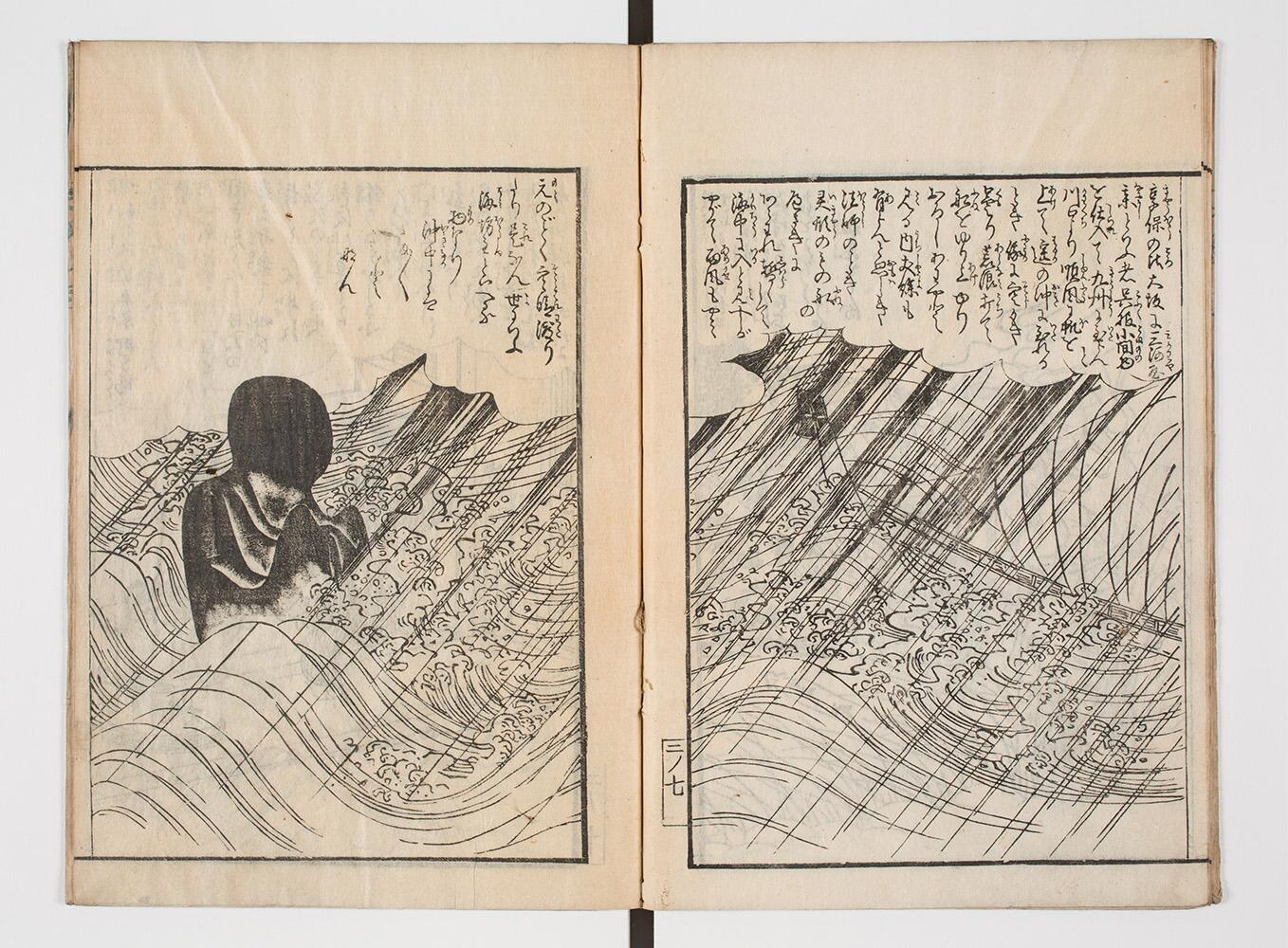
Umibōzu, from the Ehon Sayo Shigure (pub. 1801)

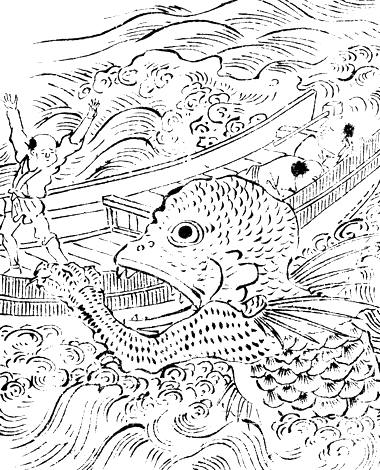
The Bakemono Chakutōchō, a kibyōshi by Kitao Masayoshi. Here appears an umibōzu with scales and a fin.

Umibōzu (海坊主; Japanese pronunciation: [ɯ.mʲi.boꜜː.(d)zɯ, ɯꜜ.mʲi.boː-], lit. 'sea monk') is a yōkai from Japanese folklore that has the form of a giant, black, human-like being.

Little is known of the origin of umibōzu but it is a mythical sea-spirit creature and as such has multiple sightings throughout Japan. Normally, umibōzu appears to sailors on calm seas which quickly turn tumultuous. It either breaks the ship on emergence or demands a ladle from the sailors and proceeds to drown them. The only safe way to escape an umibōzu is to give it a bottomless ladle and sail away while it is confused.

The monster is known by other near-synonymous names such Umihōshi (海法師) or Uminyūdō (海入道).

== Overview ==
They are often encountered by ships at night. A calm sea would suddenly surge and a giant black bōzu (bald-shaven) head surfaces, and destroy or damage ships. They are said to range from a few meters to tens of meters in length, but some are about human-size. It typically reveals only its upper body above the waist.

The umibōzu is not always solitary, and some lore claim that swarms of them arrive on ships to do mischief, such as clinging to the hull and scull as well as put out the basket fire. Their weakness is said to be smoke (tobacco fumes according to some) which causes them to flee.

The umibōzu is explained by some to be the ghost of the drowned, a belief held locally in Chiba Prefecture, though the lore from Chōshi, Chiba asserts that a certain priest named Shōgaku-bō (正覚坊) had drowned and became the umibōzu, according to Edo Period literature. (Note: Butsurui shōko , Dai-2-kan, 24.) (Cf. § Sea turtle below). An English source claims the umibōzu is more generally regarded as the spirit of the drowned priest. (Note: The English source in question (Allardice) also ascribe the umibōzu in general the tendency to assume a "praying" posture. A specific example of such occurs in the case of the turtle-like umibōzu said to make a prayer like gesture to beg mercy for its life from a fisherman.(Cf. § Sea turtle below). The source, Allardice, claims the umibōzu to be the omen to fishermen for "bad weather or an attack by pirates", though the "ill-luck" to fishermen is construed to be bad catch by a Japanese authority.)

The lore of the umibōzu is widespread and occurs all over Japan. (Note: i.e., the locale is zenkoku (全国; "entire conuntry").) Also the story of the umibōzu (or some maritime yōkai under various names) that asks for a ladle-type utensil then tries to sink the gift-giver's ship by scooping water in it, is found all over Japan. (Note: "A story commonly [found] everywhere 何處でもよくある話である".)

In a commonplace story, the umibōzu asks for a ladle-type utensil from the gullible seafarer, only to have the creature try to fill the ship with the implement and try to sink it. In the version of Ukujima island (of the Gotō Islands, Nagasaki Prefecture), the creature is called either umibōzu or funayūrei, and demands a hishaku (wooden dipper). Since it would try to use it to pour water into the fisherman's vessel, the wise strategy to survive this is to lend a ladle with the bottom punched out. This story is found all over Japan, (Note: Folklorist Tarō Nakayama's example folklore from the Bōsō (Chiba Prefecture) area holds that staying aboard a ship overnight by its seas causes the umibōzu to appear and to demand a loan of the hishaku ladle and adds "only the single example is given since the kaidan (ghostly tale) of the umibōzu is found in various places, but are essentially are all arrangements of the same material.".) though the sea creature may be told under various names. (Note: In the lore of Ise (Mie Prefecture), theumibōzu demands a shaku (「杓くれ」),) which is presumably a ladle or dipper also. In the version of Morozaki, Aichi, the funayūrei demands an aka-tori (「あかとりくれい」)、where aka refers to "bilge water" and tori means "taker, gatherer" for any kind of such tool. (Note: Similarly in Chita District, Aichi, the Kikoku-nada (鬼哭灘) is said to be appeased by casting in a bunch of shakushi ladles. (Cf. § Kikoku-nada below.).

== Nomenclature ==
Other (near-synonymous) names include Umihōshi (海法師) or Uminyūdō (海入道), where hōshi (法師) (literally "law-master") and nyūdō (入道) both refer to a monk or priest.

The umibōzu has a clean shaven head like a priest's, as aforementioned. Some English sources also generalize the umibōzu to be the spirits of drowned priests. (Note: Or priests thrown into the ocean by Japanese villagers and drowned.) (Note: According to the above-cited Japanese sources, any drowned person (regardless of profession) become umibōzu, though the victim may be a priest as in the Chōshi lore.)

Sometimes the umibōzu is conflated with the funayūrei (船幽霊; lit. "ship ghost"), and it is difficult to make a stark distinction between them. (Note: Moreover, the funayūrei is called ayakashi in such places as Yamaguchi Prefecture or Saga Prefecture.) As in the aforementioned example the same yōkai may be known as either funayūrei or umibōzu (Gotō Islands).

In the western seas the creature known as umibōzu is a human-headed sea turtle, corresponding to the heshang yu (or oshōuo in Japanese, meaning "monk-fish") from Chinese literature (cf. § Sea turtle)

In European folklore, there is also said to be sea creatures of like meaning, namely the sea monk and sea bishop.

== Legends by area ==
=== Kyūshū region ===
In the aforementioned lore around northern Gotō Archipelago, the part about the umibōzu aka funayūrei demanding the ladle is a motif that is widespread throughout Japan as aforementioned, but there are more superstitions about this yōkai according to fishermen of the area, namely, that it never tries to come aboard ship from the aft (stern) of the ship because the Funaō-sama (船王様; "Lord Ship King") faces that way, and always tries to climb from the prow. Also, if it clings onto the scull (oar), then one should keep pushing it until the edge of the oar digs in, and the umibōzu would start screaming "aitata (ouch ouch)" in pain.. (Note: Sakurada (1932), reprinted in Sakurada (1980) and Matsutani (1985), p. 183)

=== Skikoku region ===
In Uwajima, Ehime Prefecture, there are tales where they would shapeshift into a zatō (blind person) and kill human women. Also, while there are many legends of them attacking humans, in Uwajima there is the legend that those who see an umibōzu would live a long life.

=== Chūgoku region ===
In Nagato Province (now Yamaguchi Prefecture), at a part of Mukatsuku village called Kawashiri, there is a tale passed down about a fisherman long ago who had been out night-fishing and witnessed a umibōzu that came to extinguish the basket fire, so he threw the fire-lit torches at the monster.

In the Bisan Seto Sea in-between Okayama Prefecture and Kagawa Prefecture, tales are told of a type of umibōzu called the nurarihyon with a large round head: they float towards the boat, and slowly slicker (nurari) away and then unexpectedly (hyon) float approaching the boat again. They would do this several times over to taunt people. This marine creature is completely different from the old man-like yōkai called nurarihyon that bears the same name.

Around the San'in region it is said that one can encounter the umibōzu on the shore as well, while walking on the beach at night, and the slick, black mass-like creature will rub itself onto the passerby and attempt to drag the person into the sea. There are anecdotes of some survivor who got away with all his might.

From Tottori Prefecture, a piece of writing from the Edo period called Inaba kaidan-shū (因幡怪談集; "Inaba ghost stories") attests to the umibōzu. A strong man from the village next to Yonagomachi (now part of Matsue (Note: At the southwestern end, not near Yonago city at the opposite northeastern end of the prefecture.)) who boasted of being undefeated in sumo matches held at ceremonies encountered the one-eyed monster shaped like a stake measuring 2 shaku (66 centimetres (26 in)) circumference. The man captured the monster after a struggle. Most villagers who gathered could not identify it, but a 90-year old man suggested this might be the umibōzu, said to lean on to people it finds, with its body slick with goo, causing an itch all over the body if touched, or so the old man had been told by his grandfather long ago.。

=== Kinki region ===
There is also the umibōzu of unusual appearance. The creature was said to appear periodically in the bay of Kemi-ura (now Kemi in Wakayama city, Wakayama Prefecture). Finally, one was caught in the area at Miidera town, (Note: Or rather Kimiidera town, whose name takes after Kimiidera temple, which in turn derives from "Kemi".) as reported in the 26 December 1888 issue of the Miyako Shinbun of Tokyo. This umibōzu was about 7–8 shaku (2–2.5 m; 7–8 ft) tall and weighing about 60–70 kan (225–262.5 kg, 496–579 lb), and was a large ape-like creature with brown hair, orange eyes, a mouth of a crocodile, belly of a fish, tail of a lobster, and the cry of a bull.

On Awaji Island in town of Yura (now part of Sumoto, Hyōgo Prefecture), it has been told that one can be spared from an umbōzu's attack by tossing the most precious cargo into the sea. However, the prescribed rule demands one must jettison the objects from the bow end of the boat.

=== Tohoku region ===
In the Tohoku region, there is a custom of making an offering of the first catch of the season (hatsumono) to the Sea God, and if this is disregarded, the umibōzu was said to appear and destroy the boat and kidnap the boat owner.

Umibōzu are also said to change their appearance, and a tale is told on the island of Ōshima in Kesennuma, Miyagi Prefecture, about an umibōzu that shapeshifted into beautiful women and engaging in swimming contests with humans. There is also a similar tale in Iwate Prefecture, but there it is said that those who accept the challenge would be swallowed down instantly.

=== Chūbu region ===
In land-locked Nagano Prefecture there is no sea coast, but still claims to have umibōzu dwelling in its rivers. (Note: Nagano also claims to have its own version of Urashima Tarō and the sea turtle. Cf. Nezame no toko § Urashima Tarō legend.) According to legend, it lived in rivers near Kaesa in Nakano city, had giant body and a black head like the head of a giant Buddha statue. Only its upper body was said to show above water.

=== Ship ghosts and ghost ships ===
In Cape Shiriya, Higashidōri, Shimokita District, Aomori Prefecture, it is said that people eaten by sharks would become mōjabune (亡者船/亡者舟; "wandering-spirit ship"). These ghost ships can be repelled by dissolving some miso (soy bean paste) in water and letting the cold soup flow down the sea.

=== Similar creatures ===
The "umikozō" told about in the Kamo District, Shizuoka Prefecture is a boy covered with hair all the way to the sides of the eye, and it is said that they would approach fishing lines with a grin.

The folklore of the frightening mukuri kokuri or mokuri kokuri (from 蒙古高句麗 literally "Mongol and Kogureo Korea"), presumably the ghosts of the victims of the Mongol invasion is passed on in various ways, but in the area of Tanabe, Wakayama Prefecture it is told that the monster[s] appear when people visit the mountains on the lunar March 3 or if people visit the sea on the lunar May 5. (Note: Kyōdo kenkyū 郷土研究 3 (1)–(3), March–May 1913, p. 26, recapped by Minakata Kumagusu (1926).) According to one local informant, the ones that appear in the sea are a swarm of jelly-fish like things. (Note: Minakata (1926), p. 305. The main informant is a resident of Tanabe Honchō named Kusumoto Matsuzo 楠本松蔵, lantern shopkeeper, enthusiast in curiosities or antiquities, and haiku poet. He reiterated to Minakata the taboo of entering the mountains on the 3rd day of 3rd month, and ties it with properly decorating dolls, as done on this festival day called Hinamatsuri. However, the lore about the jellyfish-like swarm was recalled by Kusumoto's wife, from her childhood.) Thus this has been characterizable as an umibōzu of a sort. But locals tell it differently for the mokuri kokuri that appears on land, namely, that they are human-like creatures that stretch or shrink to different size, and are encountered in the wheat fields. And according to a variant told at Kamikohama beach in Tanabe, the terrestrial mokuri kokuri is a weasel-like small beast that puncture the butts of humans who enter wheat fields at night. This version is conjectured to be a conflation of the lores of the "earth-rat" (i.e. mole) and the kappa (Note: The kappa of lore is known to try to extracte a shirikodama (some sort of ball-like organ extractble from the buttocks).) by Minakata Kumagusu

In the Kitauwa District, Ehime Prefecture, the sea would become white at night and a "shirami", also called "shirami yūren", would come swimming, and fishers would call these idiots. However, it is said that if they hear "idiot", they'd get angry and cling on to the scull and give a bad time.

On Sado Island, the "tate-eboshi" (lit. "propped up eboshi hat") is a monster said to stand at a height of 20 m (66 ft) who would aim at ships and try to flip them over.

== In classical literature ==
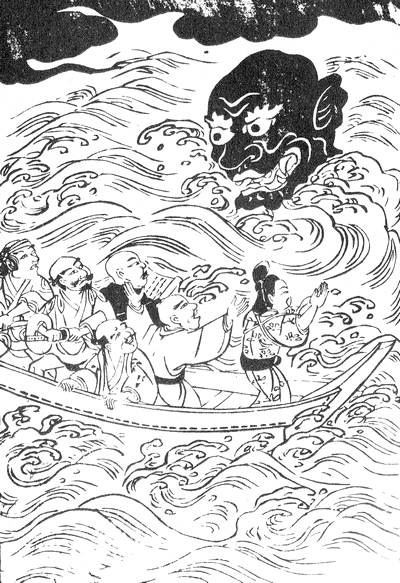
From the Kii Zōdan Shū, "In Crossing Irago, for Just One Woman, about Being Put on a Boat and Taken by a Shark" (Note: The word "shark" is missing in the original text, but the lacuna is amended by folklorist Mamoru Takada in the reprinted text which appeared in Edo kaidanshū江戸怪談集 上 ["Edo Kaidan Collections, First Part"], Iwanami Shoten, 1989.)

The Kii Zōdan Shū (published 1687) includes a narrative claiming an encounter with a 黒入道 (kuro nyūdō; "black priest, black bald thing")-type umibōzu, which purportedly took place during the Meiō era (1492–1501). Two sarugaku performers, a drummer and a flautist, needed passage to Suruga Province and boarded a ferry boat from Ise Province (Mie Prefecture) bound for Cape Irago (Aichi Prefecture). The ferryman had the policy of refusing a "lone woman" aboard, (Note: 独り女房 (hitori nyōbō; "lone woman"), or having only one female among the boat's passengers, was considered taboo at sea.) but the drummer Zenya (善彌/善弥) or Zenchin (善珍) insisted his wife be carried. When the boat encountered a big storm, the ferryman angrily blamed the presence of the lone woman for incurring the anger of the Dragon God, and told the group to cast valuables into the sea to appease the god, to no avail, (Note: The ferryman suggested funerary ashes/bones (shari) if anyone had it, as well as swords. The drummer sacrificed his drum.) Then the black bald thing appeared, which had a head five to six times the size of a human's, glittering eyes as large as Tenmoku teacups, and a horse-like (or bird-like) mouth that was 2 shaku (60 cm; 20 in) in length. The wife made her resolve and tossed herself into the ocean, and the black bald thing snatched the woman in its jaws, upon which the waves calmed and the group made it ashore, though bereft of their possessions. According to the ferryman, the black bald thing was a monster called nyūdō wani (入道鰐; lit. "priest/bald crocodile"). (Note: Kii Zōdan Shū, Book 3, 14 (excerpt); also differing block quote by Takagi (1925).) These umibōzu are said to be fallen dragon deities who would demand sacrifice.

According to the narrative found in the Honchō Goen (本朝語園; published Hōei3/1706), the samurai Shōni Yoshiyori (d. 1441) was crossing the sea to Tsushima he had an encounter with a slick, oily sea monster, and asked about it from a local fisherman, who replied that such monsters exist, (Note: The warrior, while crossing the channel encountered some creature that came aboard ship and rub its body on the hull, leaving a huge amount of fish oil aboard, then returning to the sea's depths. The fisherman who was asked about it answered there do exist creatures that behave in this way to relieve themselves from the itch in their body. (Cf. ikuchi).) additionally informing the warrior that the sea also has creatures called the umi nyūdō (海入道) (or funa nyūdō (船入道) measuring 6 to 7 shaku (182 to 212 cm; 6 to 7 ft) in height, and had neither eyes, nor nose, nor limbs. Upon seeing one, it was considered necessary to say nothing and pretend to have seen nothing, because if one says even something such as "what was that?" it would sink the boat in an instant. (Note: Kozan Koji 孤山居士. Honchō Goen 本朝語園, Book 10, 26. In the edition by Tokihisa Kurashima (1983), it seems to read 御入道(?), whereas Kōbunko redacts as 、umi nyūdō.。)

The samurai daimyo lord Yanagiwara Motomitsu's essay Kansō Jigo (閑窓自語; Kanseiera/1789–1801), which recorded the report from Kaizuka, Izumi Province (now Kaizuka, Osaka Prefecture) that an umibōzu rose out of the sea and remained ashore (near shore) for three days; meanwhile, the local inhabitants told their children not to play outside. According to eyewitnesses, it was human-like in appearance and gigantic, black as lacquerware in its entire body, but stayed half-dipped in water and was facing away, so no one saw its face.

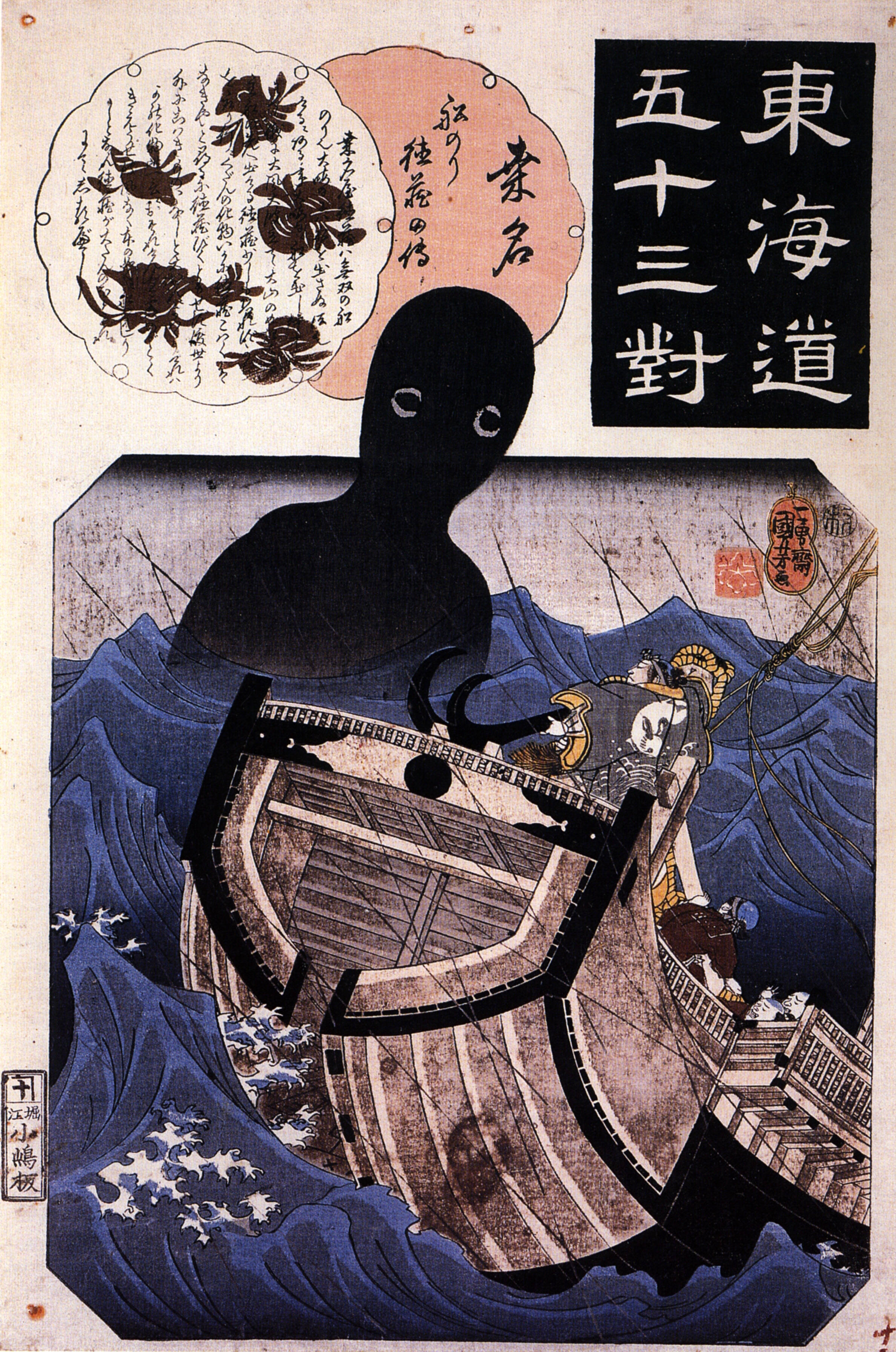
The umibōzu from the Fifty-Three Stations for the Tōkaidō, Kuwana Station: Lore of Sailor Tokuzō (「桑名： 船乗り徳蔵の伝」). Presumably the monster in Usō Kanwa and the sailor Tokuzō, by Utagawa Kuniyoshi

In the essay Usō Kanwa (雨窓閑話; pub. 1851), possibly by Matsudaira Sadanobu (d. 1829), there appears an anecdote from Kuwana (in what is now Mie Prefecture) claiming an umibōzu encounter. It was local tradition to avoid sailing at the end of the month for fear of encountering the monstrosity. But a sailor named Kuwanaya Tokuzō (桑名屋徳蔵) broke this ban and went out to sea, whereupon an umibōzu appeared that was 1 jō (3 meters) tall with eyes like mirrors painted with red pigment. The giant asked "Frightened?", to which the sailor answered, "There's nothing as frightening as trying to make it across this mundane world", at which the umibōzu disappeared. Similarly, there is a legend about a "zatō gashira" (blind man head), a blind bōzu that appears above the sea, and it would ask people, "Frightened?", and if one acts afraid and answers "I'm scared", or exclaims "Help", it would say, "You should not be going out to sea at the end of the month", and disappear.

=== Bakemono no e ===
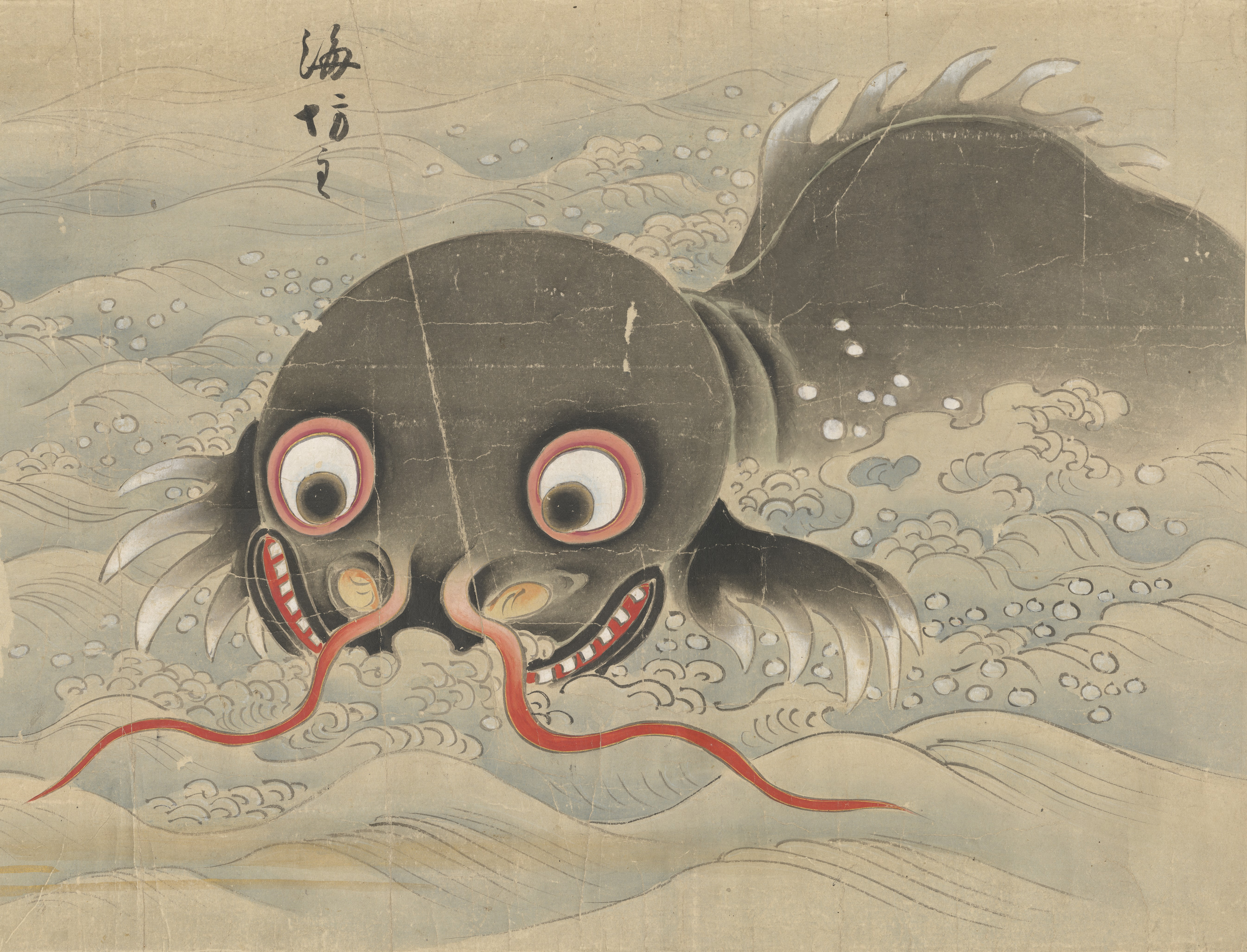
Umibōzu (海坊主) from Bakemono no e (化物之繪, c. 1700), Harry F. Bruning Collection of Japanese Books and Manuscripts, L. Tom Perry Special Collections, Harold B. Lee Library, Brigham Young University.

In the early Edo period scroll Bakemono no e, the depiction of the umibōzu is rather unique, resembling a catfish. (Note: Noboru Miyata's commentary on the umibōzu and the oshōuwo (though it does not refer to this picture scroll) extends the comment to the pan-East Asian lore of giant fish supporting the world, and the Japanese example being the giant catfish.)

=== Sea turtle ===
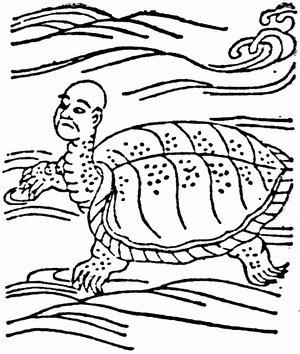
An oshō-uo (Chinese: heshàng yu, 和尚魚, lit. "monk-fish"), equated to umibōzu in Wakan Sansai Zue (detail),

Terashima Ryōan's Wakan Sansai Zue (completed 1712) has an entry for a human-faced sea-turtle, known in Chinese as the "monk-fish" (heshang yu, 和尚魚), which Ryōan claims is known as umibōzu by the Japanese who find it in the western seas. (cf. fig. right, and § Chinese tradition below).

Another work entitled Butsurui shōko (pub. 1775), as well as the later, Meiji period compilation Wakun no shiori adds that according to the lore of Chōshi Bay in Shimōsa Province (Chiba Prefecture), a priest named Shōgaku-bō (aforementioned) having drowned to death became the umibōzu. Its appearance is close to what the Japanese call "mud turtles" (Kinosternon] spp.), but the face resembles a cat, and the fore- and hind-paws do not have well-defined toes. When fishermen capture one of these, they would customarily take pity and release it.

The Wakan Sansai Zue also describes the umobōzu being released by Japanese fishermen. But encountering an umobōzu turtle was considered unlucky, (Note: Japanese: 不祥.) i.e., an omen of a bad catch. Therefore, when the turtle pressed its forearms together in front of its breast in a praying gesture, and shed tears to beg for its life, the fisherman made sure to warn the creature not to take vengeance (Note: Japanese: 雔 あだ.) on my fishing before releasing it.

In Sanuki (Kagawa Prefecture) such creature is called a Kamenyūdō (亀入道; "turtle monk").

== Chinese tradition ==
As already touched upon above (in § Sea turtle) Terashima Ryōan's Wakan Sansai Zue equates the monster known in Japan as umibōzu with the Chinese heshang yu (Note: Terashima transliterates the Chinese pronunciation as hōshan-yei? (ホウシャンイヱイ).) (lit. "monk-fish", 和尚魚, pronounced oshō-uo in Japanese), described as a red creature with a humanlike face and softshell turtle-like body of reddish color. (Note: Wakan Sansai Zue s.v. "和尚魚")

=== Sea monk ===
In the Haidao yizhi("Leisured Gazetteer of Islands" (Note: Also "Desultory Notes on the Insular Countries", "Anecdotes of the Island World", "Miscellaneous Jottings on the Archipelago", etc.) pub. 1791) by Wang Dahai, under the name of "umi oshō" or "kai oshō" (lit. "sea monk, sea priest", 海和尚, Chinese pronunciation: hai heshang), it was written to be a yōkai resembling a human but has a tear from mouth to ear, and would make a big laughter upon finding a human. Umi oshō are said to be feared because when they appear, a storm surge always follows. It is also theorized that this was actually the sea turtle hyperbolically remade into a yōkai. Note that heshangyu or "monk/priest-fish" of Chinese tradition (Japanese: oshōuo) which is human-headed and turtle (terrapin)-bodied, is equated with the umibōzu in the encyclopedia Wakan Sansai Zue.

According to the Taiwan xuzhi (臺湾續志) i.e., Xuxiu Taiwan fuzhi ("Continued & Revised Gazeteer of Taiwan Prefecture", 1764), the hai heshang sea-monk "had a red color, with head and body similar to human form, with four wings/fins, and no scales (Note: Chinese: 四翅無鱗.) so it was essentially a ningyo (man-fish, meraman), and was merely a newly coined term used around the Canton area to refer to such creatures. Whereas the hai heshang described in the Zhejiang xianzhi (浙江縣志, "Zhejian county gazetteer") is an entirely different creature.

=== Ghost-wailing sea ===
In China, there is the legend of the bald-headed sea horde called Kikokutan, or Kikoku-nada (鬼哭灘) ( Guiku tan in Chinese pronunciation, lit. "demon-crying rough sea" or "ghost-wailing sea" (Note: 鬼 is read as "oni", and ogre in Japanese, but usually signifies a ghost or dead soul in Chinese context.)). (Note: Keisuke Kuruhara likens the "Kikoku-nada" with the "Phantom Ship" and "Hand of Satan on the Sea" of the West.) The horde of about 100 "headless, (Note: Chinese: 没頭.) one-handed and one-legged, (Note: Chinese: 隻手独足.) short and bald (Note: Chinese: 短禿.) beings arrive and try to overturn the ship. They are said to dissipate once some sort of foodstuff is scattered at it. (Note: Yamazaki Yoshishige paraphrased into Japanese as "neckless(headless), one-handed, one-footed, short-statured ghost 首のなき片手片足のせいのひくき幽霊" (Seji hyakudan 世事百談, Book 3, 21, published 1843), which omits mention of baldeness. This is requoted by Inoue (1896) in Yokaigaku kōgi 妖怪学講義, and subsequently Konno (1969) follows by leaving baldness unmentioned. Mizuho Sawada (1976), an authority on Chinese fabulous material however explicitly explains it to be a "..one-handed, one-footed, short bald-demon (wandering ghost without a head of hair)片手片足の短禿鬼(頭髮のない亡者)".) Inoue Enryō considered this the counterpart of Japan's funayūrei, while Ōta Nanpo wrote it was a type of umibōzu.

The Kikoku-nada legend is also known in the Chita District, Aichi, where it has been told that if one sailed out on the lunar New Year's Eve, one was sure to encounter the eerie creature (ayakashi), but the disturbance will cease if a lot of ladles are cast into the sea.

== Recent sightings ==
In April 1971, the fishing vessels 28th Konpira Maru which sailed off from Miyagi Prefecture (Onagawa, Oshika District) allegedly had its tuna-fishing long line snapped off by a giant marine beast off of New Zealand, approximately 40 kilometres (25 mi) southeast of Cape Lyttelton, and this has been tied to the umibōzu. The creature has also been dubbed kabagon as a sort of UMA (cryptid). It had greyish wrinkled skin, with glaring eyes about 15 cm (6 in) in diameter, a flattened nose, and no mouth to be seen. Though the rest of its body was in murky waters to see clearly, there was some billowing movement under the surface suggesting a trailing tail. As they got ready to harpoon it, the monster disappeared into the sea. (Note: Konno provides the overall description but also quotes the eyewitness Tatsuo Kanazawa, (boatswain, age 30) saying "The eye size was about 15 centimeters in diameter. A big nose like a flattened [version of] a hippo's nose. Several rings of wrinkle-folds were around the round nostrils. The sea was murky and I couldn't see well [what was] underwater, but it there was some billowing, as if it was dragging its tail underwater 目の大きさは直径一五センチぐらい。カバの鼻をつぶしたような大きな鼻。丸い鼻の穴のまわりは幾重にもしわがあった。海がにごっていて水中の部分はよく見えなかったが、水中に尾をひいているようにゆらゆらしていた".)

When an officer at the Yaizu, Shizuoka branch of the Far Sea Fisheries Research Laboratory heard of this account, he supposed that it was likely that the fishermen were mistaking an organism, such as a fish or whale, for a monster. In another eyewitness account, the half of its body that appeared from the water surface was about 1.5 m (5 ft) in length, so by inferring that its whole body was several times that length, they said that they never heard of an organism like that.

These accounts were published in Mainichi Shimbun on July 17 of the same year.

== Rational explanations ==
The umibōzu sometimes appear at seas with no abnormalities (and in this case, once the umibōzu was seen, the weather would start getting stormy), so it's pointed out that these could be things that do exist but were misinterpreted. Some examples of things that could have been misinterpreted include sea organisms, cumulonimbus clouds, big waves, and other natural phenomena.

Umibōzu always appear only in the ocean, usually during peaceful waters and fair weather. These fair conditions would normally put the sailors at ease as they are literally "sailing on smooth waters" but the possible presence of a malicious spirit put many sailors on edge in these times of peaceful sailing. Upon its sudden rising from the ocean, causing waves and sometimes flipping ships or breaking them with its emergence, umibōzu is accompanied by the winds begin to blow and waves toss the ship about. The appearance of an umibōzu alone causes this dramatic shift in weather which puts any ship in immediate peril, not only from being capsized by the waves but also from being crushed by the yōkai. This could be a mixing of the funayūrei legends which suggests these yōkai appear during storms at sea.

== See also ==
- Sea draugr
- Sea monk
