= Juan Cabrera =

Juan Cabrera may refer to:

- Juan Domingo Cabrera (1952–2007), Argentine footballer
- Juan Ignacio Cabrera (born 2003), Uruguayan footballer
