= Tabo (hygiene) =

Traditional cleaning tool in southeast Asia

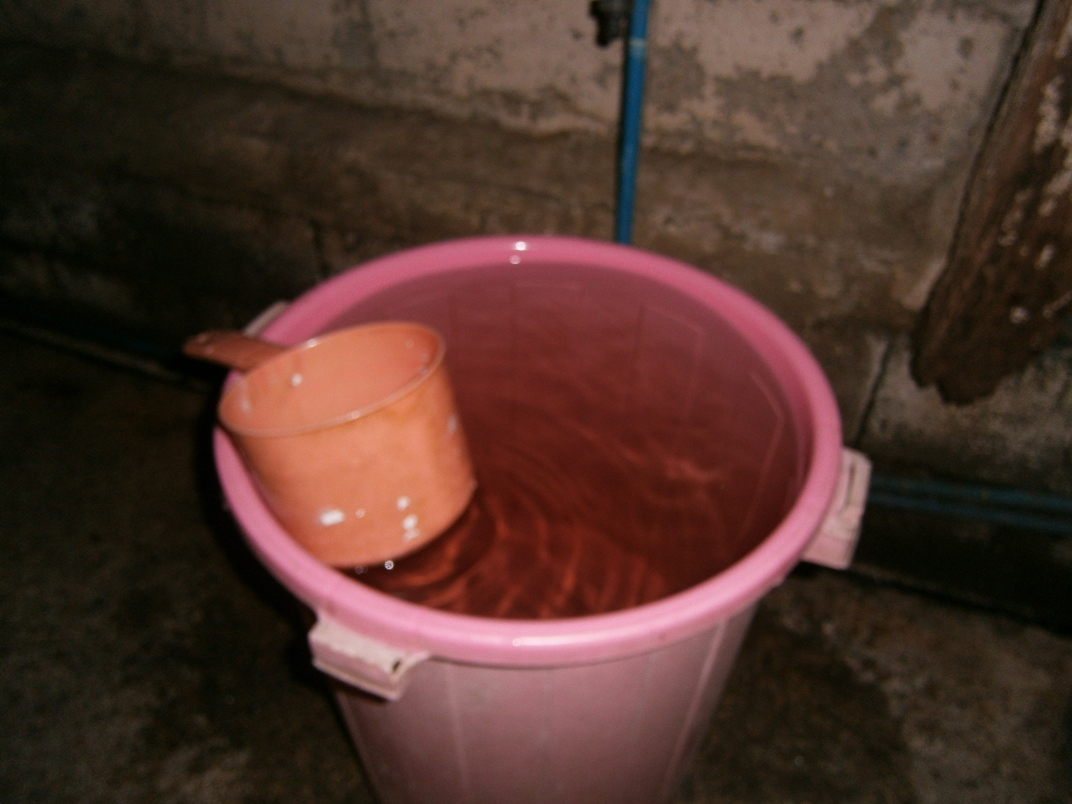
The timbâ (pail) and the tabò (dipper) are two essentials in Philippine bathrooms and bathing areas.

The tabò (Tagalog pronunciation: [ˈtaːbɔʔ]) is the traditional hygiene tool primarily for cleansing, bathing, and cleaning bathroom floors in the Philippines, Indonesia, East Timor, Malaysia, Vietnam, Thailand and Brunei. Tabò is the Filipino name, while gayung and cebok (Malay pronunciation: [tʃeˈbok]) are the equivalent terms used in Indonesia, Brunei, Malaysia, and East Timor. Its Vietnamese name is thau tắm or chậu nước. The tabò could most commonly be found in rural areas though it is also widely used in cities. The word may be related to the word cebok in Indonesia and Malaysia, which describes the act of cleansing oneself with a tabò or cebok, typically done in the bathroom (kamar mandi).

The tabò can sometimes be translated into English as a "dipper" or "pitcher", but according to anthropologist Michael Tan of the University of the Philippines-Diliman, tabò is much more than a dipper. The plastic tabò is an almost indispensable fixture in the Filipino home, with those in the diaspora bringing their own tabò or even asking relatives to send one over if they forget.

Tabò is also widely used anywhere in a household for purposes other than bathing, such as for measuring volume. 1 tabò is often equal to 1 liter, as usually the household tabò would be used to hold a 1 liter of motor oil.

A tabò has similarity in design and use to the hishaku (柄杓), a Japanese water dipper with a handle made of bamboo.

== History ==
The tabò is the Filipino version of the dipper that is also well known in other Southeast Asian countries that use their own version of a dipper. The "modern" tabò was created with the introduction of plastic, using modern materials to create the dipper instead of traditional coconut and bamboo. In the past, the tabò was also called a sartín, from the Spanish sartén; back then sources of water were sometimes few and far between, which caused the ancestors of today's Filipinos to develop the tool or device. Instead of standing up each time to be able to reach the water source and wash their hands, the sartín was passed around to save time and, essentially, water, according to historian Lito Nunag of the University of the Philippines-Diliman.

=== Early use ===
The early tabò dating back to the pre-colonial period used to be made out of coconut shell and bamboo, and it was not used as a toilet implement.

The tabò and its equivalent in many traditional homes in Southeast Asia is not so much a toilet item as an all-purpose household object. It is found at the entrance of the house, next to a terracotta water jar (palayók) so guests can wash their hands and feet before entering the house. There, the tabò speaks of courtesies, the host's as well as the guest's. In the traditional kitchen, the tabò is again found with the palayók, which keeps and cools drinking water. The tabò is strategically located there for the purposes of taking out water to drink and of washing of hands and/or dishes. The tabò reflects an obsession with cleanliness, one which seems to have declined over time as the palayók and the tabò disappeared, or, in the case of the tabò, was relegated to the toilet and limited to its present, less sanitary function.

== Usage ==
The plastic tabo is kept mainly in the bathroom and is used as a water dipper for various functions. The emphasis is on properly utilizing the tabò or else a mess will be made in the toilet. Its primary purpose is to clean. It is used to clean the toilet floor, to get water to flush the toilet, and most importantly, to get water for personal cleanliness: for washing the anus after using the toilet, for washing hands, for shampooing, or for bathing the whole body.

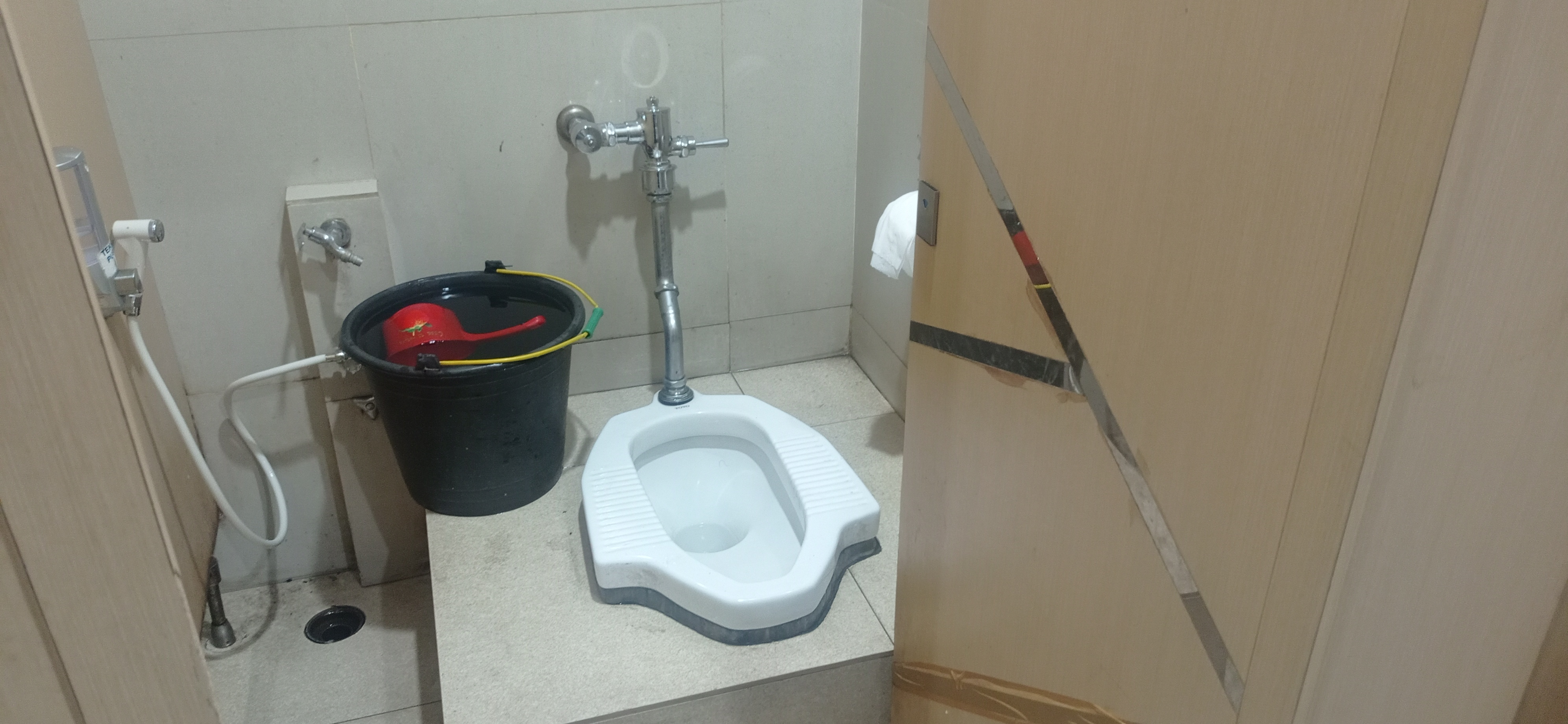
Tabo in airport public toilet

Filipinos use the tabò in addition to or instead of toilet paper to wash after using the bathroom. Not all toilets in the Philippines have an automatic flush, so instead, a timbâ (generally a plastic pail with a metal handle) and a tabò kept floating inside it is used. Upon entering the toilet, the pail should be checked if it has enough water. Filipinos thoroughly wash their hands after going to the toilet, using water and any available cleansing agent such as soap or laundry detergent.

== Culture ==
=== Language ===
Michael Tan mentioned that in the 17th century, the Jesuit Ignacio Alcina noticed how different words were used in the Visayan languages to refer to washing the feet, the hands, and the genitalia. One of Tan's readers wrote to confirm this, giving the many verbs for different types of washing, many of which probably involved the tabò.

=== Adaptation to the environment ===
The tabò is made out of two of the more ubiquitous items in the Philippine environment: coconut and bamboo.

The use of the tabò is ecological in the way it recycles coconut shells. More importantly with regards to the toilet, it allows an economical use of water, often a scarce resource in many of the homes of Filipino families. For this purpose, the traditional tabo loses in terms of effectivity in saving water to the modern plastic version. The traditional tabò was developed in a pre-toilet era. It takes less water than the plastic one, not enough for flushing the toilet. The plastic tabò takes just about the right amount of water, which can have enough force for flushing, but that also requires some degree of artistry in the way one douses the water.

=== Cultural issues ===
Non-Filipinos (apart from non-Filipino Muslims who use similar hygiene practices, or others from places in Asia and Africa where the use of water is normal) may find the practice strange.

A controversy sparked in January 2009 when a Filipino machine operator was reportedly sacked by an engineering firm in Australia allegedly for his toilet habits. A Townsville Bulletin report posted on news.com.au said that Amador Bernabe, 43 years old, who is a Filipino machine operator, was kicked out of his job by the Townsville Engineering Industries (TEI) for using water, instead of toilet paper, to clean himself during toilet visits. After an investigation was conducted, Bernabe got his job back in the firm.

== See also ==
- Istinja – a similar Muslim practice for hygiene
- Lota (vessel) – an equivalent vessel used in the Indian subcontinent and Africa
- Ladle (spoon)
