= Nutmeg (association football) =

Football and field hockey technique

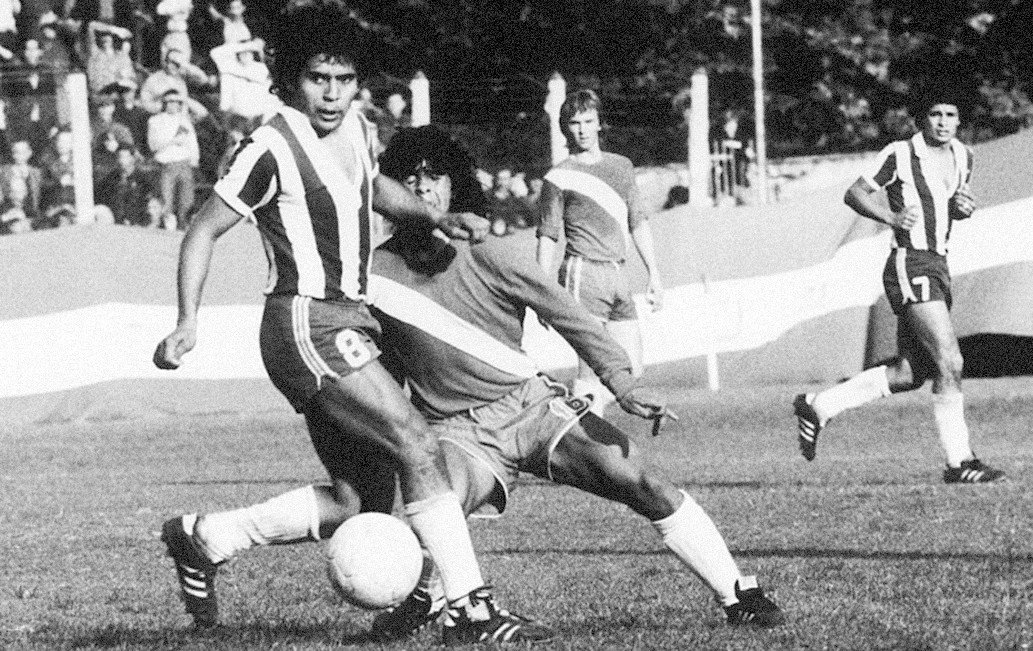
Diego Maradona's (centre) famous nutmeg against rival Juan Cabrera (left), the day he debuted in Argentine Primera División playing for Argentinos Juniors, 20 October 1976

A nutmeg, also known by dozens of national and regional variations, is a skill used mainly in association football, but also in field hockey, ice hockey, and basketball. The aim is to kick, roll, dribble, throw, or push the ball (or puck) between an opponent's legs (feet). This might be done to pass or when shooting the ball, but a nutmeg is more commonly associated with the skill of dribbling where it enables a player to get behind a defender.

== Exponents in football ==
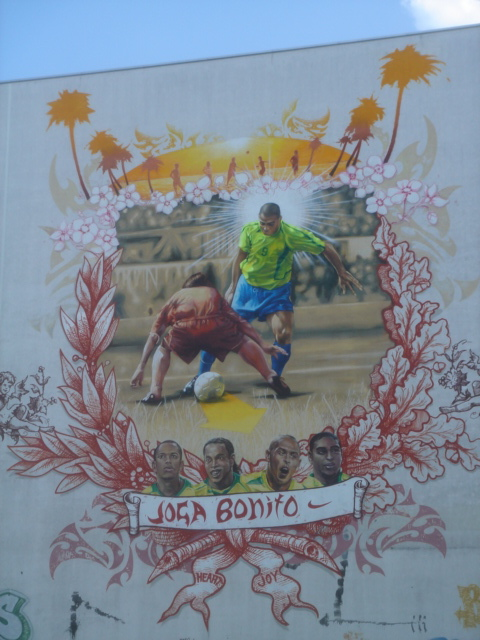
Mural of Ronaldo nutmegging an opposing player, with the legend "Joga bonito" (plays beautifully) at bottom. The work in Berlin was commissioned by Nike prior to the 2006 World Cup in Germany.

Kicking the ball through an opponent's legs in order to get the ball past them and back to the original player is a dribbling skill that is commonly used among football players. Owing to its effectiveness and being visually impressive, it is very popular among players and can be frequently seen being attempted multiple times throughout a game, whether by a single player or many different players. Some of the most notable practitioners include Riquelme, Ronaldo, Ronaldinho, Robinho, Cristiano Ronaldo, Neymar, Luis Suárez, Lionel Messi, Tobin Heath, and Eden Hazard. Suárez in particular is known for having a penchant for executing it constantly, which led to the banner and saying "Suárez can nutmeg a Mermaid" during his time at Liverpool.

=== Street football game ===
There is also a street football game, originating in the Netherlands, which is called 'Panna Knock-Out' (after panna; Surinamese Sranan Tongo for gate, and borrowed in Dutch slang for nutmeg). This game depends on the usage of this technique, in which players face off in one-on-one matches, aiming to nutmeg (panna) their opponent to eliminate them, with the last remaining player declared the winner. The game is played in so-called 'panna cages', which contain 2 small goals and an asphalt surface.

In France and other French-speaking regions, children, (mainly boys) sometimes play a game called petit pont massacreur or "petit pont-baston" ("small bridge massacre" and "small bridge fight" in French, but equivalent to nutmeg slaughter and nutmeg rumble in English or string-a-kick in Jamaica). During this game, any player that gets a nutmeg becomes the target of all other players, who are then allowed to kick the player, until he touches a predefinite object in the game area. The violence of this game got it to be highly mediatised during the 2000s, after children were hospitalized because of it. This is similar to a game played by children in the UK called "nutmeg rush".

== Etymology ==
An early use of the term is in the novel A bad lot by Brian Glanville (1977). According to Alex Leith's book Over the Moon, Brian - The Language of Football, "nuts refers to the testicles of the player through whose legs the ball has been passed and nutmeg is just a development from this". The use of the word nutmeg to mean leg, in Cockney rhyming slang, has also been put forward as an explanation.

Another theory, supported by the OED, was postulated by Peter Seddon in his book, Football Talk - The Language And Folklore Of The World's Greatest Game. The word, he suggests, arose because of a sharp practice used in nutmeg exports in the 19th century between North America and England. "Nutmegs were such a valuable commodity that unscrupulous exporters were to pull a fast one by mixing a helping of wooden replicas into the sacks being shipped to England," writes Seddon. "Being nutmegged soon came to imply stupidity on the part of the duped victim and cleverness on the part of the trickster." While such a ploy would surely not be able to be employed more than once, Seddon alleges it soon caught on in football, implying that the player whose legs the ball had been played through had been tricked, or, nutmegged.

== In other sports ==
In the National Basketball Association, Manu Ginóbili and Jamaal Tinsley employ the pass between the legs variant. Some commentators also use the term "five-hole" when this happens; the term arose in ice hockey for when the puck passes between the goalie's legs into the goal.

In cricket, England's Nat Sciver-Brunt had the "Natmeg" shot named after her, when she hit a cricket ball through her legs during a game.

In cricket, if ball goes through the legs of a fielder, in Kashmiri language it's said to be a taharat of the fielder. Taharat is the equivalent of Istinja.

== In other languages ==
Nutmeg is the British English name for this technique.

- In Spanish speaking countries like Argentina, Colombia, Chile, Costa Rica, Spain and Mexico, it is called "caño" (spout, pipe), "túnel" (tunnel), "horqueta" (pitchfork) or "cocina" (kitchen).
- In Albania it is called "kaush" (cornet) or "mes shalëve", meaning "between the thighs".
- In Algeria it is called "qerƐa" (قرعة), meaning "bottle".
- In Angola it is called "caguero" or "Iona".
- In Australia it is called a "nutmeg", “nutties” or "megs".
- In Austria it is called "Gurkerl", literally meaning "small cucumber", referring to pickled cucumbers.
- In Botswana it is called "kitchen" or "keafeta".
- In Brazil it is called a "caneta" (pen), "janelinha" (little window), "rolinho" (little roll), "ovinho" (little egg) or tabaca.
- In Brunei it is called "lasut" or "ole".
- In Bulgaria it is called "мрежичка", meaning "a small net".
- In Cameroon it is referred to as "n'zolo".
- In Cape Verde it is called "lavagem" meaning wash.
- In Catalan speaking countries like Catalonia or Andorra it is called "tunel" or "sotana", meaning "tunnel" or "cassock" in English.
- In China it is called "Chuandang" (穿裆).
- In Cyprus it is called "Παττίχα" meaning "watermelon".
- In Czech Republic it is usually called "jesle" (hay rack) or "housle" (violin).
- In Denmark, Sweden and Norway it is called "tunnel".
- In Dutch it is known by the verb "poorten" (lit. 'gating'), and in Dutch slang it is known by the Surinamese Sranan tongo word "panna" (lit. gate). This Surinamese word can also be found in other European/Latin and African countries.
- In Ecuador it is called “galleta” (Cookie).
- In Egypt and Saudi Arabia it is called "kobry" (كوبري), meaning "bridge (n)".
- In Ethiopia it is called "lochie", or "weled" in Tigrigna.
- In Finland it is called "länget" (horse collar) or "puikot" (sticks).
- In France it is called "petit pont" (little bridge).
- In Germany it is called "Tunnel" (tunnel), "Beini" or "Beinschuss" (leg shot).
- In Ghana it is called "SULIA".
- In Greece it is called "podia" (ποδιά) meaning "apron".
- In Hong Kong (Cantonese) it is called "通坑渠" (drainage cleaning).
- In Hungary it is called "kötény" (apron), "szoknya" (skirt) or "bőr" (skin)
- In Iceland it is called "klobbi" literally meaning a crotch.
- In India it is called "Galla", derived from ‘gali’ meaning narrow lane. In some parts of India it is also called "Pana" literally meaning a spanner.
  - In Malayalam it is called "nada" meaning "through the middle", e.g. "Messi avante nada eduthu" means "Messi has nutmegged him".
- In Indonesia it is called kolong meaning "pit".
- In Iran it is called "laayee" (لایی) meaning "in between", or "the one that goes between (the legs)".
- In Ireland it is called "megs".
- In Israel it is called "השחלת חוט במחט" (lit. "threading a needle") or "הברשה" (brushing).
- In Italy it is called "tunnel". In some parts of Italy it is also called "busta" (with the meaning of "bag").
- In Jamaican English it is known as "salad".
- In Japan it is called "Mata nuki" (股抜き/lit. "passing through the groin").
- In Jordan it is called "balaḥa" (بلحة), meaning "date (n)".
- In Kashmiri it is called `Taharat` which is equivalent of Istinja.
- In Kenya it is commonly known as "chobo" or "chobwe" - kupigwa chobo (nutmegged)
- In Korea it is called "Alggagi (알 까기)" (hatching an egg).
- In Lebanon it is called "Bayda" (بيضة), which means egg or testicle.
- in Libya it is called "bomshi" which is a kind of stones.
- In Lithuanian it is called "sijonas", which means skirt, or "klynas", which means space between your legs.
- In Luxembourg it is called "petit pont" (little bridge).
- In Madagascar it is called "kanalina" (channel)
- In Malawi it is called Kalulu meaning "the hare" or "the rabbit"
- In Malaysia and Singapore it is known as an "olé" or "50sen".
- In Malta it is called "cracker tat-tazza" meaning "cup cracker".
- In Mandarin it is called "穿裆" (chuāndāng), meaning "through the crotch".
- In Mauritania it is called "Yali".
- In Morocco it is called “Bayda“ (بيضة), which means egg.
- In Myanmar it is called "phaung gyar hte' htae".
- In Namibia it is called "Junkie" or "Kootjie"
- In Nepal it is also called "अन्डा पार्नु" (lay egg).
- In New Zealand, it is generally referred to as ''nutmegged'' or ''megged".
- In Nigeria It is referred to as "Toros" or "Da Pata" or "Kolo" a Yoruba word which is used to refer to a local piggy bank and ''okpuru'' in Igbo, a word which directly translates to under. In northern Nigeria, it is also called OC(Oh see).
- In Norway it is called "Tunnel". In the same meaning as in English. It can also be referred to as "luke" (hatch).
- In Pakistan it is called "Chadda" or "panna".
- In Papua New Guinea it is called "one-kina", after the coin which has a hole in the middle. It is pronounced in English.
- In Peru it is called "huacha".
- In Polish it is called "siata" (net), "kanał" (canal) or "dziurka" (hole).
- In Portugal it is usually called a "túnel" (tunnel), "cueca" (underpants), "rata" or "ova" (roe).
- In Quebec, Canada it is called "toilette" (toilet), "tasse de café" (cup of coffee) implying that someone has been served.
- In Romania it is called "urechi", meaning "ears", or "craci", meaning "legs".
- In Russia it is called "mezhdu nog" (между ног), "otverstiye" (отверстие) or "ochko" (очко), meaning "hole".
- In Senegal it is called "yalli".
- In Sierra Leone it is called "under waise" or "under cellar"
- In South Africa it is also known as a "iShibobo".And also "Spy two".
- In Sweden it is called "tunnel" (noun) and "tunnla" (verb).
- In Tanzania it is called "tobo" or more accurately "kupigwa tobo" (nutmegged).
- In Thai it is called "ลอดดาก" or "ดากไหม้".
- In Trinidad and Tobago it is called "breed".
- In Tunisia it is called "Ɛeḍma" (عظمة), meaning "egg".
- In Turkey it is called "beşik" (cradle), "beşlik" (5-pointer), "bacak arası" ("from between the legs") or (for the defender) "yumurtlamak" (lay eggs).
- In Uganda it is: "Okubiika Eggi" meaning "to lay an egg" or "okuzaala abalongo" which is giving birth to twins.
- In Ukraine it is called "p'yatdesyat kopiyok" (п'ятдесят копійок, fifty cents), which is derived from the comedic idea that if a player nutmegs you, you owe them 50 cents.
- In Uzbekistan it is called "Чотакай" (groin).
- In Vietnam it is called "xỏ háng" (lit. "pierced groin") or "xâu kim" (lit. "threading the needle").
- In Zambia it is called a "pomo or Olilo"
- In Zimbabwe it is called "deya, window or umbhoko"
- In Yemen it is called "طاقة" or "طوقي" meaning "window".

== See also ==
- Dribbling
