= Ikuchi =

Legendary sea serpent yōkai in Japanese folklore

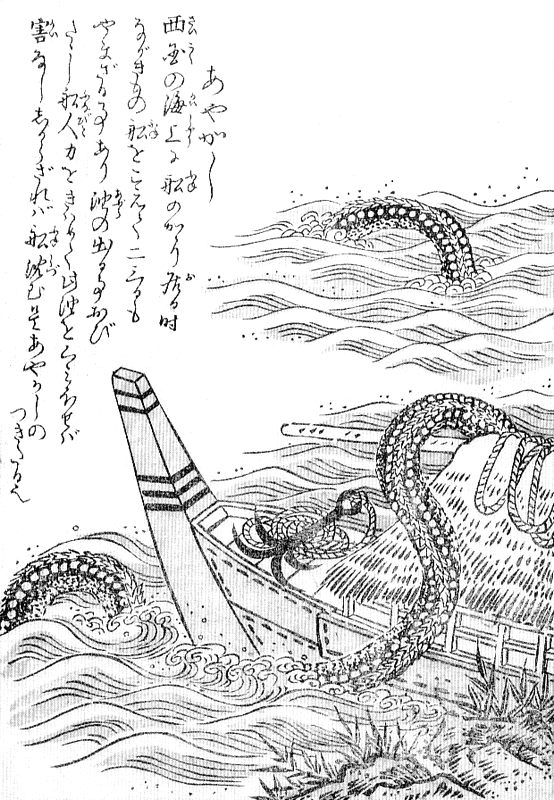
The "ayakashi", from the Konjaku Hyakki Shūi by Toriyama Sekien. The description closely resembles that of the ikuchi.

Ikuchi is a yōkai of the sea serpent type in Japanese legend.

It has been described in two anecdote collections during the Edo period, namely Tankai (譚海) (1795) by Tsumura Sōan and Mimibukuro (耳嚢) (completed 1814) by Negishi Yasumori .

== Tankai ==
According to Tankai ("Sea of Stories", 1795) by Tsumura Sōan, the ikuchi (ゐくち) is an extremely long fish dwelling in the deep waters off Hitachi Province (now Ibaraki Prefecture). It has only been spotted at night, sometimes rearing out of water and slinking over a ship, taking a long time to complete its passage, and leaving a residue of viscous oil. The sheer amount of oil needs to be dumped overboard lest the ship sink.

It does not have much thickness supposedly, but spans a total length of several hundred jō(several thousand feet) (Note: One jō is equivalent to 10 shaku and each shaku is close to an English foot in length.), requiring 1 or 2 koku (1+ or 2+ hours, perhaps little less than 3 hours) to finish hauling its whole length across the ship. (Note: The original text gives "一二刻"、which should be parsed as "1 or 2 koku" It is said to have been spotted "Always in the shade of night 常に夜陰の事にて", so the nighttime 1 koku is applicable, and this is continually variable since it is defined as 1/12 th of however long the night is, whatever season it may be. At summer solstice, the nighttime koku lasts only 1 hour 20 minutes, at which point 2 koku is 2 hours 40 minutes, short of 3 hours.) Its body oil is said to have the consistency of funori (gummy substance derived from Gloiopeltis seaweed) and slickens the ship's deck so walking back and forth becomes impossible. Thus the ship needs be scrubbed and cleansed thoroughly after a visit by the ikuchi.

== Mimibukuro ==
In "Mimibukuro" ("Ear bag", 1782–1814) by Negishi Yasumori, there occurs a description of a similarly named creature called ikuji".

This ikuji was said to appear in the western and southern seas of Japan, and it would get snagged on the bow of the ship. It had the colors similar to an eel, and was immeasurably long, perhaps several jō in length, and it would keep squirming on the bow for the length of 2, 3 days.

The phrase "ikuji naki" ("lacking courage") purportedly derives from this creature's name.

The author, Negishi, states that he heard from a certain informant that in the island of Hachijō-jima in Izu Province (Note: Original text reads Hachijō in Zushū province, but giving the Japanese shorthand abbreviations for names of former provinces is of no particular significance.) (the island is now incorporated into Tokyo Prefecture), there can be found small-sized ikuji which look like eels but have no eyes or mouth and form circular loops. Negishi thus conjectures that the (full grown) ikuji reported to dangle itself from the ship's bow, must actually be hanging like a ring on the bow and revolving around.

== Sekien's ayakashi ==
The drawing of "ayakashi" in Toriyama Sekien's Konjaku Hyakki Shūi depicts an enormously long sea creature, said to appear in the seas of Western Japan, "slithering" over a ship for two or three days, (Note: The original text merely reads "nagaki mono (長きもの; lit. the 'long thing')" does this slithering, whereas the Yoda & Alt translation interprets it as "a tendril long enough", and notes the connection to the Western lore of the Kraken, a giant cephalopod.) depositing loads of oil, forcing the crew to "furiously bail" it out, for fear it would cause their ship to sink.

The description of Sekien's ayakashi is closely similar to the ikuchi, and Japanese commentators have equated them, noting that ayakashi is merely a generic term for all sorts of strange phenomena (and monsters) of the sea.

== Analyses ==
The ikuchi has depicted by Sekien's like a sea serpent and some sources categorize ikuchi as belonging to a class of sea serpents, or creature of uncertain identity, i.e., cryptids. It has been conjectured it might be unknown giant species of sea snakes.

English translators of Sekien regard the "long thing" appearing out of the sea, not as the entire body of the sea-serpent like creature, but as a single strand of long "tendril" (tentacle) of the monster, suggesting this may be an imported lore of the kraken, a legendary giant cephalopod creature.

An additional piece of lore associated with the ayakashi is that they are formed by the souls or ghosts of humans who have drowned and want others to join them. (Note: Such a characterization applies to the ayakashi depicted in the manga Ushio & Tora, Vol. 5, Ch. 20–25.)
