= Funayūrei =

Legendary Japanese boat spirits

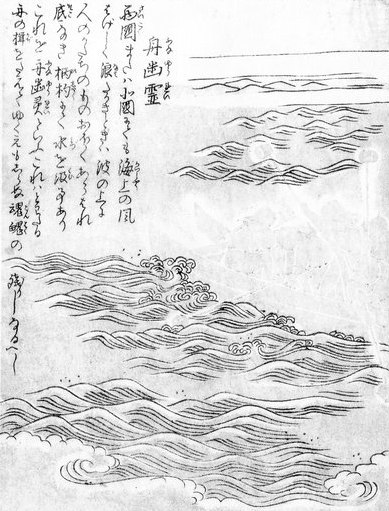
"Funayūrei" from the Konjaku Gazu Zoku Hyakki by Sekien Toriyama

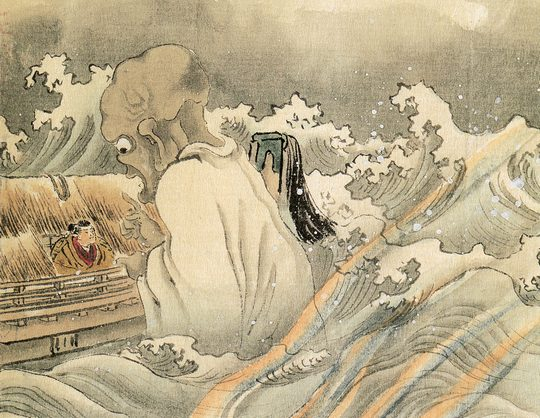
Kawanabe Kyōsai's "Boatman and Funayūrei". An example of a funayūrei rendered as an umibōzu-like yokai.

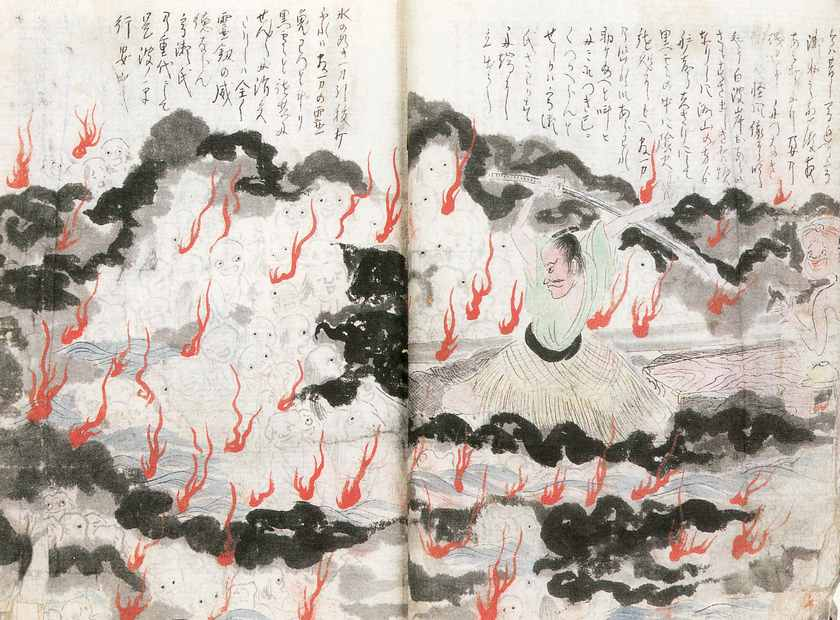
An example of a funayūrei appearing as mysterious flames. From the Tosa Bakemono Ehon.

Funayūrei (船幽霊 or 舟幽霊; literally "boat spirit") are spirits (yūrei) that have become vengeful ghosts (onryō) at sea. They have been passed down in the folklore of various areas of Japan. They frequently appear in ghost stories and miscellaneous writings from the Edo Period as well as in modern folk customs. In Yamaguchi Prefecture and Saga Prefecture, they are called Ayakashi.

== Legends ==
Funayūrei are ghosts believed to use hishaku (ladles) to fill boats with water and make them sink. They are said to be the remnants of people who have died in shipwrecks and are attempting to cause humans to join them. According to legends, there are various methods that can be used to protect from the harm they inflict, such as throwing onigiri into the sea or preparing a hishaku with its bottom missing. They're also called mōjabune (亡者船), bōko, or ayakashi depending on the region. Umibōzu, colossal giants encountered far out at sea, are sometimes considered to be a type of funayūrei rather than a type of yōkai.

Their appearance as depicted in legends varies widely depending on the area. There are stories that speak of ghosts that appear above water, of boats that are themselves ghosts (ghost ships), of ghosts that appear on human-occupied ships, or of any combination of the above. They are described as appearing like umibōzu or as an atmospheric ghost light. There are many legends of funayūrei at sea, but they have also been described as appearing in rivers, lakes, and swamps of inland areas. In Kōchi Prefecture, the kechibi, a type of onibi, is also sometimes seen as being a type of funayūrei.

They often appear in rainy days, nights on a new or full moon, stormy nights, and foggy nights. When it appears as a boat, the funayūrei itself glows with light, so that it is possible to confirm its appearance even at night. Also, on the sixteenth day of Bon, the dead would attempt to approach the side of the ship and sink it. They are also said to appear on very foggy evenings, and attempt to capsize ships by making a cliff or a boat without a pulley appear, since getting startled and attempting to avoid it would result in capsizing and getting stranded on a reef. It is said that these illusions can be made to disappear by sailing though them.

Other than attempting to sink ships, in the town of Ōtsuki, Hata District Kochi Prefecture, they are said to make the boat's compass malfunction, and in the Toyoma Prefecture, fishing boats that travel to Hokkaido get turned into a funayurei, causing the crew to hang themselves. In Ehime Prefecture, when one encounters a funayurei, trying to avoid it by changing the boat's route, will run the boat aground. Also, in the past, to avoid shipwrecks during bad weather, people would light a bonfire on land. However, a funayurei would light a fire on open sea and mislead the boatmen, and by approaching the fire, they would get eaten by the sea and drown.

There are also various legends about how to drive away funayurei depending on the area. For example, in the Miyagi Prefecture, when a funayurei appears, they would disappear if one stops the ship and stares fixedly at the funayurei for a while. Stirring up the water with a stick is also said to work. There are also theories that vary from place to place about throwing thing into the sea to avoid them. In Kōzu-shima, it would be flowers and incense, incense sticks, dango, washed rice, and water, in Kochi Prefecture, it would be ashes and 49 rice cakes, in Otsuki, Kochi, it would be summer beans, and in Nagasaki Prefecture, it would be woven mats, ashes, and burnt firewood. Also, in Kochi Prefecture, it is said to be possible to drive funayurei by saying "I am Dozaemon (わしは土左衛門だ)" and asserting to be one of the funayurei. In Ehime, one is able to disperse the funayurei by lighting a match and throwing it.

== Classics ==
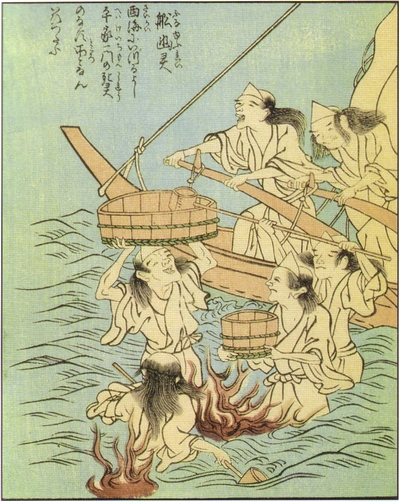
"Funayūrei" from the Ehon Hyaku Monogatari by Takehara Shunsen

In the collection of fantastic stories, the Ehon Hyaku Monogatari from the Edo period, the funayurei that appear on the western sea are departed souls from the Taira. The Taira clan fell in the Battle of Dan-no-ura, but in the open sea between Dan no Ura and Mekari in the Kanmon Straits (Hayamoto, 早鞆), a funayurei wearing armor and helmet would appear, say "give me a bucket", and cling to the boat. By lending a hishaku, it would pour water onto the boat, so when crossing this sea on a boat, one would thus prepare one with its bottom open, and thus stave off the funayurei. Once, there was a Buddhist priest who, feeling pity for the spirit, performed a rite, causing it to go away.

Genrin Yamaoka, an intellectual from the Edo period, commented on funayurei that appear as balls of fire or ghosts at sea. Referring to Zhu Xi and the Cheng-Zhu school, he brought up several examples of departed souls that died with resentment and remained even after carrying out their revenge, and concluded, "even by seeing something from 10 people, by sometimes going along with reason, you can also sometimes see it in ancient Chinese books (かやうの事つねに十人なみにあることには待らねども、たまたまはある道理にして、もろこしの書にもおりおり見え待る)". Although it is not possible to get a hold of smoke with one's hands, by accumulating it and staining one's hand, it is possible to take it into one's hands. The spirit (気, ki) is the beginning of one's nature, and when the spirit stagnates, the ones that create a form and produce a voice are called yurei. In the first place, the stagnated spirits of the ghosts desire to fall, and disappear.

== Modern examples ==
In 1954, after the Toya Maru accident, the largest marine accident to occur after the war, the ferryboats that went on commission after the accident were discovered to have a strange scar on their propeller, providing an example of where rumors started to spread about how the victims of the accident turned into funayurei and dug claws into the propellers. This funayurei appears in sea and on land, and in Nanaehama, Hokkaido, there is a rumor that at midnight, a female would appear completely wet riding in a taxi, who would disappear once one reaches the destination, and who was rumored to be the ghost of Toya Maru. Also, in Aomori Station, the staff members who slept in the night duty room would wake up at the sound of banging on the glass window, and would see the hand of the completely wet female on the other side, got startled that "Toya Maru's victims were pleading for help," and the next morning, there would be a promissory note remaining on that glass window.

Also, in 1969, in the sea in Kanagawa Prefecture, one would observe a white human figure, hear a voice saying "Please give me a hishaku," and it was said that the shipwrecked members of the university's yacht club were wanting to bail water.

== From the view of folkloristics ==
According to the folkloristician, Hideo Hanabe, funayurei appear in evenings of wind and rain and heavy fog, and also frequently when the weather suddenly worsens, and since the matter that accidents happen more easily adds a sense of reality, and since they also give a feeling of eeriness and unease, some of the strange incidents would be put into a frame of legends, so that phantoms and illusions would be spoken of as reality. The fact that they often appear during Bon makes its image overlap with that of the shōrōbune. However, at its foundation, as ones who are not deified, there is also faith in the spirits of those who have died at sea and float around and turn into funayurei, and in Bon and in New Year's Eve, and other set days, it is forbidden to fish or go to sea, or forbidden to go close to the sea, and a prohibition on breaking these taboos.

== Theories on their true identity ==
Funayurei are said to possess ships and prevent them from moving, but they have somewhat been given a scientific explanation in the modern era with description of the phenomenon of internal waves causing the nautical effect of dead water. For example, in the area of the ocean that is at the mouth of large rivers, there are areas of water with low salinity, but since water with low salinity is comparatively light, it would stagnate to sea level, but the water on both sides would not move too much, and would form a boundary. Around that boundary, if the boat has a screw propeller, however much one turns it, the energy would merely stir up the water on the boundary, and expended all on creating internal waves, resulting in the boat not moving. In polar regions, ice would melt and float into the middle of sea, creating the same result, which was also recorded by the polar explorer Nansen. In this way, there is a hypothesis that the internal waves accompanied by changes in the salt content, the water temperature, and the hydraulic pressure would obstruct the boat from advancing.

== By area ==
Inadakase
The coast of Fukushima Prefecture. They speak to people on ships, saying "lend me an inada (hishaku)". An "inada" is a hishaku that is used on boats, if one doesn't open a hole in it before giving it over, it would suddenly fill the boat with water and cause it to sink.
The man in white, the beautiful princess
Kowaura, Minamiise, Mie Prefecture. During storms, it would say "Lend me a hishaku" to boats that were too slow to flee and sink the boat. By lending a hishaku with a hole in it, it is possible to flee and return.
Murasa
Tsumamura, Oki District, Shimane Prefecture (now Okinoshima). Here, what might appear to be noctiluca in the lake is said to be a crystallization of salt, but by staring in there, the thing that spherically solidified while shining is Murasa. By making the boat go over it, the boat would suddenly sink.
Also, there are cases where at night the sea would suddenly shine with light, but this is due to being possessed by Murasa, and it is said that it is effective to attach a sword or knife to the end of a pole and stir the sea several times with it.
Yobashiri
Aishima, Abu District, Yamaguchi Prefecture (now Hagi). By coiling a white sail and making it run forward, it would also run along. By scattering ashes and making a sound, it would disperse.
Ugume
Hirado, Nagasaki Prefecture and Goshourajima, Kumamoto Prefecture, among other areas of Kyushu. It is said that when a boat is possessed, it obstructs the boat's movement, and in Hirado, a sail boat would come chasing even though there is no wind. In the western coast of Kyushu, it appears as an illusion of a boat or an island. In order to avoid this, in Hirado, it would be to throw ashes, and in Goshourajima, it would be to say "I'm putting down the anchor (錨を入れるぞ)" while throwing a stone, and then throwing the anchor. They are also said to disappear if one smokes tobacco. They are also said to appear while saying "give me an akadori (淦取り, a scoop for removing water that gathers at the bottom of a ship)", and they would sink a ship if one doesn't give them an akadori that has its bottom open.
Mayoibune
Onga District, Fukuoka Prefecture and in the same prefecture Kanezaki, Munakata. On the evening of moonlight nights around the time of Bon, they appear as sailboats at sea. It is said that atmospheric ghost lights would appear and people's voices could be heard.
Mouren Yassa (亡霊ヤッサ)
Kaijō District, Chōshi city, Chiba Prefecture (now Asahi). On days of deep fog and stormy days, it is a funayurei that would appear to fishing boats, and it is said that a spirit of someone who died in a shipwreck is attempting to increase their fellows. A voice would approach the boat saying "mouren, yassa, mouren, yassa, lend me an inaga (モウレン、ヤッサ、モウレン、ヤッサ、いなが貸せえ)", and suddenly a hand would come from the sea, saying "give me a hishaku", but since it would sink the boat if lent a hishaku, it is said that one should thus give a hishaku with its bottom open. "Mouren" means ghost, and "inaga" means a hishaku, and "yassa" are the encouraging shouts used while rowing a boat. In the works of the yokai manga cartoonist Shigeru Mizuki, it was written as Mourei Yassan (猛霊八惨), and in Sakaiminato, Tottori Prefecture, Mizuki's birthplace, a festival has been opened for calming this Mourei Yassan.
Misaki (ミサキ)
Appearing in Fukuoka Prefecture among other places, they are seen as a kind of Funayurei.
Namourei
In the legends of Kosode, Ube town, Kunohe District, Iwate Prefecture, (now Kuji), it is a yokai that appears frequently along with black boats, and they make an impossible demand "give me a paddle in times of storms (時化(shike)の時などに櫂(kai)をよこせ)", but it would do no good to reply, or lend them a paddle.

== Similar legends outside Japan ==
- According to the Keirin Manroku (桂林漫録) (written in Kansei 12), there are writings such as "the ghosts of those who have drowned become ghosts that capsize ships (覆溺(fukudeki)して死せる者の鬼(ghosts)を覆舟鬼ということ)" and "they are seen in writings about yokai overseas (海外怪妖記に見たりと)" stating that what are considered funayurei to the Japanese were also written about in China. In China, there are legends of a phenomenon called "Kikokutan no Kai" (鬼哭灘の怪), and discolored monsters would attempt to capsize ships (these are close to the umibōzu).
