= Ayakashi (yōkai) =

Group of yōkai which appear above water

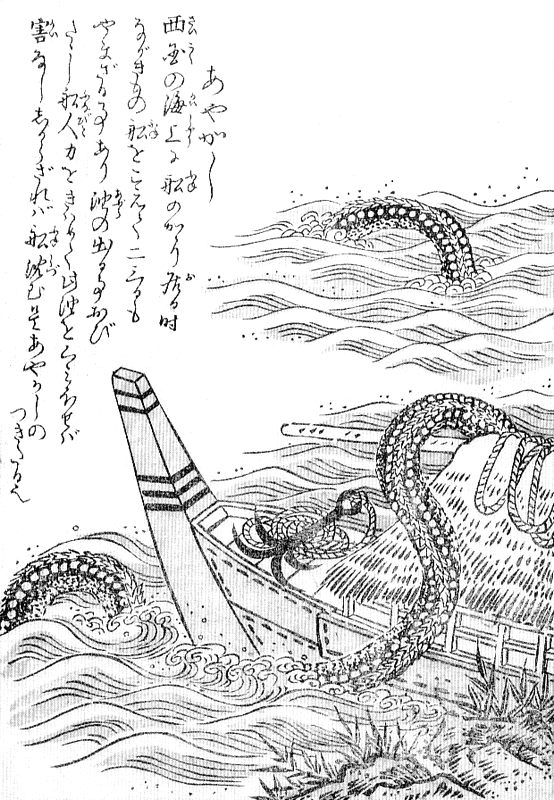
"Ayakashi" from the Konjaku Hyakki Shūi by Sekien Toriyama

Ayakashi (アヤカシ) is the collective name for yōkai that appear above the surface of a body of water.

In Nagasaki Prefecture, the atmospheric ghost lights that appear above water are called ayakashi, and so are the funayūrei in Yamaguchi Prefecture and Saga Prefecture. In western Japan, ayakashi are said to be the vengeful spirits of those who died at sea and that they are attempting to capture more people to join them. On Tsushima Island, they are also called "atmospheric ghost lights of ayakashi (ayakashi no kaika)", and appear on beaches in the evening, and are said to look like a child walking in the middle of a fire. In coastal Japan, atmospheric ghost lights appear as mountains and obstruct one's path, and are said to disappear if one does not avoid the mountain and tries to bump into it intently.

There is also the folk belief that if a live sharksucker were to get stuck to the bottom of a boat, it would not be able to move, so ayakashi is used as a synonym for this type of fish.

In the Konjaku Hyakki Shūi by Sekien Toriyama, the ayakashi are represented by a large sea snake, but this may actually be an ikuchi.

== Legend in Japan ==
In the Kaidanoi no Tsue, a collection of ghost stories from the Edo period, there was as stated above. It was in Taidōzaki, Chōsei District, Chiba Prefecture. A certain ship needed water and went up to land. A beautiful woman scooped up water from a well and returned to the boat. When this was said to the boatman, the boatman said, "There is no well in that place. A long time ago, there was someone who needed water and went up to land in the same way and went missing. That woman was the ayakashi." When the boatman hurriedly set the ship to sea, the woman chased after him and bit into the hull of the ship. Without delay, they drove it away by striking it with the oar, and were able to escape.

== See also ==
- Kitsunebi
- List of legendary creatures from Japan
- St. Elmo's fire
- Will-o'-the-wisp
