= List of Ushio & Tora chapters =

First tankōbon volume cover of Ushio & Tora, published by Shogakukan on November 17, 1990

The chapters of the Ushio & Tora manga series were written and illustrated by Kazuhiro Fujita. The series follows the adventures of a boy named Ushio Aotsuki, the son of a temple keeper, who after having reluctantly released the imprisoned powerful tiger-like monster, Tora, the two begin a journey together, fighting against supernatural beings threatening the world. It was serialized in Shogakukan's shōnen manga magazine Weekly Shōnen Sunday from January 24, 1990, to October 23, 1996. Shogakukan collected its chapters in 33 individual tankōbon volumes, released from November 17, 1990, to December 10, 1996. An additional gaiden volume was released on May 17, 1997.

Shogakukan re-published the series in a 19-volume bunkoban edition from September 15, 2004, to March 15, 2006. A 20-volume kanzenban edition was published between May 18, 2015, and December 16, 2016.

Fujita drew a two-chapter short of the series to raise funds for areas devastated by the March 2011 earthquake. These chapters were published in Weekly Shōnen Sunday on December 26, 2012, and January 9, 2013.

== Volumes ==
No.	Release date	ISBN
1	November 17, 1990	4-09-122481-4
001. "Prologue: Ushio's Fated Meeting" (序章 うしおととらであうの縁, Joshō Ushio to Tora Deau no En); Story 1: "The Stone Eater" (石喰い, Ishikui): 002. "Disappearance at the Old School House" (旧校舎に消ゆ, Kyū Kōsha ni Shōyu); 003. "The Beast Spear Revealed" (獣の槍発揮, Kemono no Yari Hakki); 004. "The Centipede Transforms" (百足変化, Mukade Henka); Story 2: "The Oni in the Painting" (絵に棲む鬼, Eni Sumu Oni): 005. "Reiko" (礼子); 006. "Masaki" (間崎); 007. "Oni" (鬼)
After being constantly annoyed by his father's stories related to that of his own lineage, middle schooler Ushio Aotsuki is ordered to clean out the basement. While there, he discovers a trap door that leads him into confronting a tiger-like monster from the very same legend that his father informed him of; for over 500 years, the monster had been sealed away by a legendary warrior who wielded the Beast Spear, and has been kept in the family's temple ever since. The monster tries to tempt Ushio into pulling it out, but is rejected and abandoned. However, when Ushio accidentally releases the evil energy emitted by the monster, he is forced to do so. This results in Ushio being transformed by the Beast Spear's own effects, giving him an appearance resembling that of the legendary warrior. Upon purifying the temple, Ushio decides to take responsibility for his actions my monitoring the monster's every move. He decides to name the monster Tora due to his appearance while agreeing to accompany him in his adventures in fighting other monsters (including that of the Stone Eater and the Oni in the Painting) as long as he never tries to kill him.
2	December 13, 1990	4-09-122482-2
008. "Roar" (咆哮, Hōkō); 009. "Portrait of Reiko" (礼子像, Reiko-zō); Story 3: "Tora Goes to Town" (とら街へゆく, Tora Machi e Yuku): 010. "Lord Gamin" (餓眠様, Gamin-sama); 011. "A Town Full of Dangers" (街の中には危険がいっぱい!, Machi no Nakaniha Kiken ga Ippai!); 012. "Tora's Civilization Allergy" (とらと 文明あれるぎい, Tora to Bunmei Arerugī); 013. "Tora Intervenes" (とら推参!, Tora Suizan!); 014. "Tora's False Charge" (とらの濡れ衣, Tora no Nureginu); Story 4: "Seal Magician Hyou" (符咒師ひょう, Fujushi Hyō): 015. "The Man Who Hunts Monsters" (化物を狩る男, Bakemono Okaru Otoko); 016. "An Adversary Appears" (刺客参上!, Shikaku Sanjō!)
3	March 18, 1991	4-09-122483-0
017. "Hyou's Past" (鏢の過去, Hyō no Kako); 018. "Troubled Ushio" (うしお、なやむ, Ushio, Nayamu); 019. "Hyou vs. Ushio" (ひょう対うしお, Hyō tai Ushio); Story 5: "Ayakashi Sea" (あやかしの海, Ayakashi no Umi): 020. "Ushio and Tora Go to Sea" (うしおととら海へ, Ushio to Tora Umi e); 021. "Ayakashi" (あやかし); 022. "Tora and Asako Eaten" (とら・麻子、食われる, Tora Asako, Kuwareru); 023. "Inside Ayakashi's Stomach" (あやかしの腹の中, Ayakashi no Haranouchi); 024. "Showdown!!" (対決!!, Taiketsu!!); 025. "To the Limits of the Soul" (魂の果て, Tamashī no Hate)
4	May 18, 1991	4-09-122484-9
Story 6: "Legend" (伝承, Denshō): 026. "My Father's Secret" (父の秘密, Chichi no Himitsu); 027. "My Father's Determination" (父の決意, Chichi no Ketsui); 028. "My Father's Decision" (父の決断, Chichi no Ketsudan); 029. "Setting Out" (旅立ち, Tabidachi); Story 7: "The Guys Are Up in the Sky" (ヤツは空にいる, Yatsu wa Sora ni Iru): 030. "Taxiing" (タキシング, Takishingu); 031. "Take Off" (テイクオフ, Teiku Ofu); 032. "Flight" (フライト, Furaito); 033. "Mayday" (メイデイ, Meidei); 034. "Approach" (アプローチ, Apurōchi); 035. "Landing" (ランディング, Randingu)
5	August 9, 1991	4-09-122485-7
Story 8: "The Houriki Heretic" (法力外道, Hōriki Gedō): 036. "Kyoura" (凶羅, Kyōra); 037. "First Attack" (初撃, Shogeki); 038. "Counterattack" (反撃, Hangeki); 039. "Rending Attack" (破撃, Hageki); Story 9: "Chaotic Wind" (風狂い, Kaze Kurui): 040. "Ushio is Asked a Favor by Youkai" (うしお、妖怪に頼みごとをされる, Ushio, Yōkai ni Tanomi-goto Osareru); 041. "Tora Meets with Misfortune, Ushio Battles a Youkai" (とらは災難にあい、うしおは妖怪と闘う, Tora wa Sainan ni Ai, Ushi Owa Yōkai to Tatakau); 042. "Tora and Ushio Pursue Juuro" (とらとうしおは十郎を追いかける, Tora to Ushio wa Jūrō O Oikakeru); 043. "Ushio Stands Still and the Wind Whirls in the Sky" (うしおっは立ちつくし、風は空に舞う, Ushio wa Tachi Tsukushi Kaze wa Sora ni Mau); Story 10: "The House with a Child" (童のいる家, Warabe no Iru Ie): 044. "Saya of Takatori" (鷹取りの小夜, Takatori no Saya)
6	September 18, 1991	4-09-122486-5
045. "The Sealed Room" (封じこめの間, Fūjikome no Ma); 046. "The Child Dance" (童舞, Domai); Story 11: "The Striking Mirror" (一撃の鏡, Ichigeki no Kagami): 047. "The Striking Mirror" (一撃の鏡, Ichigeki no Kagami); Story 12: "The Tono Youkai on the Warpath" (遠野妖怪戦道行, Tōno Yōkai-sen Michiyuki): 048. "Ushio Is Attacked by the Youkai" (うしお、妖怪どもに襲撃さる, Ushio, Yōkai-domo ni Shūgeki Saru); 049. "The Youkai Confer Together" (妖怪ども相話す, Yōkai-domo Ai Hanasu); 050. "The Youkai Hate That Woman" (妖怪ども女を憎む, Yōkai-domo Onna O Nikumu); 051. "The Youkai Pursue Ushio" (妖怪どもうしお追撃す, Yōkai-domo Ushio Tsuigekisu); 052. "The Youkai Have an Audience with Tora" (妖怪どもとらと相まみえる, Yōkai-domo Tora to Aimamieru); 053. "The Youkai's Fight Against Hakumen no Mono" (妖怪ども「白面の者」と闘うこと, Yōkai-domo 'Hakumen no Mono' to Tatakau Koto)
7	November 18, 1991	4-09-122487-3
053. "The Youkai Watch Tora and Hitotsuki's Decisive Battle" (妖怪ども、とらと一鬼の決戦をみる, Yōkai-domo, Tora to Hitotsuki no Kessen O Miru); Story 13: "You'll Be Dry There" (おまえは其処で乾いてゆけ, Omae wa Sonotokoro de Kawaite Yuke): 054. "Death Carried a Knife" (包丁を持った死, Hōchō O Motta shi); 055. "Fumiyo and Shiori" (史代と詩織, Fumiyo to Shiori); 056. "Under the Demon's Mask" (鬼面の下, Kimen no shita); 057. "To the Pyramid Tower" (三角の塔へ, Sankaku no Tō e); 058. "You'll Be Dry There" (おまえはそこでかわいてゆけ, Omae wa Soko de Kawaite Yuke); Story 14: "The Channel of Souls in Repose" (鎮魂海峡, Chinkon Kaikyō): 059. "The Channel of Souls in Repose" (鎮魂海峡, Chinkon Kaikyō); Story 15: "You Come Out of the Warped Night" (汝 歪んだ夜よりきたる, Nanji Yuganda Yoru Yori Kitaru): 060. "Man" (男, Otoko); 061. "Night" (夜, Yoru)
8	January 18, 1992	4-09-122488-1
062. "Crescent Moon" (三日月, Mikazuki); 063. "Return to the Night" (夜に還れ, Yoru ni Kaere); Story 16: "The Guardian God of the Lake" (湖の護り神, Mizuumi no Mamorishin): 064. "Kagami, Katayama, and Ayumi Suffer" (香山、片山、歩 受難, Kayama, Katayama, Ayumi Junan); 065. "The God of the Land and the Snake God" (土地神様と蛇神, Tochi Kamisama to Hebigami); 066. "Drink the God Sake" (神酒を飲む, Kami Sake Wonomu); 067. "The Spear's Seal" (槍の封印, Yari no Fūin); 068. "The Guardian God of the Lake" (湖の護り神, Mizuumi no Mamorishin); Story 17: "The Mist Comes" (霧がくる, Kiri ga Kuru): 069. "Misty Road" (霧の道, Kiri no Michi); 070. "Escape from the Mist" (霧からの脱出, Kiri Kara no Dasshutsu); 071. "In Pursuit of the Mist" (霧の追跡, Kiri no Tsuiseki)
9	March 18, 1992	4-09-122489-X
072. "Meikai Gate" (冥界の門, Meikai no Mon); 073. "The Mist's Sprint" (霧の疾走, Kiri no Shissō); 074. "Are You Standing Tall?" (まっすぐに立ってるか, Massugu ni Tatteru ka); Story 18: "Pursuit of the Hiyou – The Chosen" (婢妖追跡～伝承者, Hiyō Tsuiseki ~ Denshōsha); Part 1: "Hinowa Sekimori" (関守 日輪, Sekimori Hinowa): 075. "The Hiyou Set Loose" (婢妖放たる, Hiyō Hanataru); 076. "The Beast Spear Discovered" (獣の槍 発見さる, Kemono no Yari Hakken Saru); 077. "The Chosen of the Spear" (槍の伝承者, Yari no Denshōsha); Part 2: "Nagare Akiba" (秋葉 流, Akiba Nagare): 078. "The Chosen on the Motorcycle" (バイクに乗った伝承者, Baiku ni Notta Denshōsha); 079. "Bakemono" (妖); 080. "The Hiyou Bus" (婢妖のバス, Hiyō no Basu); 081. "The End to a Hard Run" (激走停止, Gekisō Teishi)
10	June 18, 1992	4-09-122490-3
Story 19: "Beastly Karakuri" (畜生からくり, Chikushō Karakuri): 082. "Asako and Mayuko (1)" (麻子と真由子・前編, Asako to Mayuko Zenpen); 083. "Asako and Mayuko (2)" (麻子と真由子・中編, Asako to Mayuko Chūhen); 084. "Asako and Mayuko (3)" (麻子と真由子・後編, Asako to Mayuko Kōhen); Story 20: "Pursuit of the Hiyou – The Chosen" (婢妖追跡～伝承者, Hiyō Tsuiseki ~ Denshōsha) "Satoru Moritsuna" (杜綱 悟, Moritsuna Satoru): 085. "Battle of the Chosen" (伝承者の攻撃, Denshōsha no Kōgeki); 086. "Repelling Divination" (式神の撃退, Shikigami no Gekitai); 087. "Old Wounds" (過去の疵, Kako no Kizu); 088. "Satoru Awakens" (悟めざめる, Satoru Mezameru); 089. "Ushio Inside the Body" (うしお体内へ, Ushio Tainai e); 090. "The Cry Inside the Body" (体内鳴動, Tainai Meidō)
11	July 17, 1992	4-09-123101-2
091. "Invasion of the Brain" (頭脳への侵攻, Zunō e no Shinkō); 092. "Chibakama's Resounding Laugh" (血袴の哄笑, Chibakama no Kōshō); 093. "The Blow Reflected in the Retina" (網膜に映る一撃, Mōmaku ni Utsuru Ichigeki); 094. "Only as Much as Hoped For" (望んだ数だけ, Nozonda Kazu dake); Story 21: "Change of Face" (変貌, Henbō): 095. "The Directive" (通達, Tsūtatsu); 096. "Mobilization" (行動, Kōdō); 097. "To Kamuikotan" (カムイコタンへ, Kamuikotan e); 098. "Attack of the Hiyou" (婢妖襲来, Hiyō Shūrai); 099. "Encounter" (遭遇, Sōgū)
12	September 18, 1992	4-09-123102-0
100. "Reiko/Saya" (礼子・小夜); 101. "Hinowa/Jun/Yuu" (日輪・純・勇); 102. "To the Cave, Mayuko" (洞へ～真由子, Hora e Mayuko); 103. "Mayuko/Tora" (真由子・とら); 104. "Asako" (麻子); 105. "Counterattack – Asako" (反撃～麻子, Hangeki ~ Asako); 106. "Resurrection – And Then, at Last…" (復活～そしてついに, Fukkatsu ~ Soshite Tsuini); Story 22: "The Time Reversing Demon" (時逆の妖, Tokisaka no Bakemono): 107. "Demono of the Cave" (洞の妖, Hora no Bakemono); 108. "Go Back in Time" (時さかのぼりて, Toki Saka no Borite); 109. "The 2,300-Year-Old Memory" (二千三百年の記憶, Ni Sensanbyaku Nen no Kioku)
13	December 12, 1992	4-09-123103-9
110. "Creating the Holy Blade" (神剣をつくる, Shinken o Tsukuru); 111. "The White-Faced Demon" (白面の妖, Hakumen no Bakemono); 112. "Into Utter Darkness" (暗冥へ…, Anmei E…); 113. "The Demon of the Beast Spear" (獣の槍の妖, Kemono no Yari no Bakemono); 114. "Guiding Demon" (導きの妖, Michibiki no Bakemono); 115. "Demon, Bring Us Home" (妖、帰還す, Demon, Kikansu); Story 23: "The Snow Doesn't Vanish at Dawn" (暁に雪消え果てず, Akatsuki ni Yuki Kiehatezu): 116. "The City Covered in Snow" (雪込めの街, Yuki Kome no Machi); 117. "Snow Daughter" (雪娘, Yuki Musume); 118. "Sakuma" (佐久間)
14	March 18, 1993	4-09-123104-7
119. "Frozen Tears" (涙凍りつき, Namida Kōritsuki); 120. "Tora Returns" (とら帰る, Tora Kaeru); 121. "The Snow Doesn't Vanish at Dawn" (暁に雪消え果てず, Akatsuki ni Yuki Kiehatezu); Story 24: "Ushio Casts Aside the Beast Spear" (獣の槍を手放す潮, Kemono no Yari O Tebanasu Ushio): 122. "Ushio, This is a Major Pinch!" (潮、絶対のピンチか!?, Ushio, Zettai no Pinchi ka!?); Story 25: "Countdown Railroad" (時限鉄道, Jigen Tetsudō): 123. "Advancing" (進行, Shinkō); 124. "Rushing" (突入, Totsunyū); 125. "32 Minutes to Go" (三十二分前, Sanjūni-bu Mae); 126. "18 Minutes to Go" (十八分前, Jūhabun Mae); 127. "13 Minutes to Go" (十三分前, Jūsanbun Mae); 128. "10 Minutes to Go" (十分前, Jūbun Mae)
15	May 18, 1993	4-09-123105-5
129. "6 Minutes to Go" (六分前, Robun Mae); 130. "Just Before Passing Out" (通過直前, Tsūka Chokuzen); 131. "Passing Out of the Tunnel" (トンネル通過, Tonneru Tsūka); 132. "Continuing on Track!" (線路は続くよ, Senro wa Tsuzukuyo); Story 26: "High Speed Star": 133. "The Start" (THE START～始まり～, Hajimari); 134. "Biker" (BIKER～バイカー～, Baikā); 135. "Attack" (ATTACK～攻撃～, Kōgeki); 136. "Ignition" (IGNITION～点火～, Tenka); 137. "Battle" (BATTLE～戦闘～, Sentō); 138. "Overdrive" (OVER DRIVE～オーバードライブ～, Ōbādoraibu)
16	July 17, 1993	4-09-123106-3
Story 27: "The Fourth One, Kirio" (四人目のキリオ, Yoninme no Kirio): 139. "Hakumen Quickens" (白面 胎動, Hakumen Taidō); 140. "Crisis at the Head Temple" (本山の危機, Motoyama no Kiki); 141. "Oyakume-sama" (役目様); 142. "The Battle with "Kuragi"" ("くらぎ"との闘い, "Kura gi" to no Tatakai); 143. "Shodai-sama Comes" (参ります、初代様, Mairimasu, Shodaisama); 144. "From Ushio to Kirio" (うしおからキリオ, Ushio kara Kirio); Story 28: "Incitement: Destroy the Beast Spear" (檄召～獣の槍破壊のこと, Gekimeshi Kemono no Yari Hakai no Koto): 145. "Nagatobimaru Tora" (長飛丸とら); 146. "Shikigami Use/Satoru Moritsuna, Shinjutsu/Jun" (式神使い・杜綱悟、心術・純, Shikigami Tsukai Moritsuna Satoru, Shinjutsu Jun); 147. "The Empty Corpse's Thread" (空骸の糸, Utsumukuro no Ito); 148. "The Red Cloth" (赤い織布, Akai Shokufu)
17	November 18, 1993	4-09-123107-1
149. "Theft of the Beast Spear" (獣の槍強奪, Kemono no Yari Gōdatsu); 150. "The House of the Whisperers" (囁く達者の家, Sasayaku Tassha no Ie); 151. "Nagare and Tora (1)" (流ととら 1, Nagare to Tora Ichi); 152. "Nagare and Tora (2)" (流ととら 2, Nagare to Tora Ni); 153. "Hinowa and Ushio (1)" (日輪とうしお 1, Hinowa to Ushio Ichi); 154. "Hinowa and Ushio (2)" (日輪とうしお 2, Hinowa to Ushio Ni); 155. "Inasa's Diary" (引狭の日記, Inasa no Nikki); 156. "Materia" (マテリア); 157. "Kuin vs. Tora" (九印対とら, Kyūin Tai Tora); 158. "Destruction of the Beast Spear" (獣の槍破壊, Kemono no Yari Hakai)
18	March 18, 1994	4-09-123108-X
159. "The Avatar Towako" (斗和子化身, Towako Keshin); 160. "House of Scorn" (嘲笑の家, Chōshō no Ie); 161. "The Beast Spear Rumbles" (獣の槍鳴動, Kemono no Yari Meidō); 162. "Violence" (激越, Gekietsu); 163. "Demon of Destruction, God of Destruction" (砕魔砕神, Saima Saishin); 164. "Eternal Solitude" (永却の孤独, Eigō no Kodoku); 165. "Incitement: Failure" (檄召～失敗のこと, Gekimeshi Shippai no Koto); Story 29: "Asako's Sports Day" (麻子の運動会, Asako no Undōkai): 166. "Asako's Sports Day" (麻子の運動会, Asako no Undōkai); Story 30: "Fools Gather at a Party" (愚か者は宴に集う, Orokamono wa Utage ni Tsudou): 167. "Written Invitation to a Party" (宴への招待状, Utage e no Jōtaijō); 168. "Metamorphosis" (変化す, Henkasu)
19	May 18, 1994	4-09-123109-8
169. "Battle Mayuko" (戦闘真由子, Sentō Mayuko); 170. "Tayura/Nadoka" (たゆら・などか); 171. "A Bit of Play" (戯れ事, Zaregoto); 172. "The Mud and the Hat" (泥と帽子, Doro to Bōshi); 173. "Mayuko Runs" (真由子走る, Mayuko Hashiru); 174. "Mayuko and Tora" (真由子ととら, Mayuko to Tora); Story 31: "The Day I Swung the Swing" (ブランコをこいだ日, Buranko O Koidahi): 175. "Minoru" (ミノル); 176. "Nightmare" (悪夢, Akumu); 177. "Satori" (さとり); 178. "The Day Before the Operation: The Day of" (手術前日～当日, Shujutsu Zenjitsu Tōjitsu)
20	August 15, 1994	4-09-123110-1
179. "The Day I Swung the Swing" (ブランコをこいだ日, Buranko O Koidahi); Story 32: "Ushio and Tora Start the New Year" (うしおととらの一年事始め, Ushio to Tora no Ichinen Kotohajime): 180. "Ushio and Tora Start the New Year" (うしおととらの一年事始め, Ushio to Tora no Ichinen Kotohajime); Story 33: "The Seal of the Gedou" (外堂の印, Gedō no Shirushi): 181. "Coming from Shikoku" (四国から来たる, Shikoku Kara Kitaru); 182. "The Manifestation of Gedou" (外堂発現, Gedō Hatsugen); 183. "Mino" (水乃緒, Minō); 184. "Possession" (憑依, Hyōi); 185. "Confusion" (当惑, Tōwaku); 186. "The Female Gedou" (女外堂, Onna Gedō); 187. "Mino Dances" (水乃緒乱, Mino Ranbu); 188. "True Form" (本体, Hontai)
21	September 17, 1994	4-09-123401-1
189. "School House Quake" (激震校舎, Gekishin Kōsha); 190. "Gedou Possession" (外堂憑く, Gedō Tsuku); 191. "Gedou Don't Come Home" (外堂帰りぬ, Gedō Kaerinu); Story 34: "The Western Bakemono War" (西の国・妖大戦, Nishi no Kuni Bakemono Taisen): 192. "The Osa of the West" (西の長, Osa no Naga); 193. "The Tono Bakemono" (遠野妖, Tōno Bakemono); 194. "Bakemonotachi" (妖たち); 195. "The War Begins" (戦始まる, Sen Hajimaru); 196. "Jayou and Hitotsuki" (蛇妖・一鬼, Jayō Hitotsuki); 197. "Kamaitachi, Raishin, and Kagari" (鎌鼬・雷信、かがり, Kamaitachi, Raishin, Kagari); 198. "Thunder Beast Tora" (雷獣とら, Raijū Tora)
22	December 10, 1994	4-09-123402-X
199. "Ushio and Ibuki" (うしお・威吹, Ushio Ibuki); 200. "Shinno vs. Ushio" (神野対潮, Shinno tai Ushio); 201. "The Gamble" (賭試合, Toshiai); 202. "Kamaitachi of the East/Kamaitachi of the West" (東の鎌鼬・西の鎌鼬, Azuma no Kamaitachi Nishi no Kamaitachi); 203. "The Demon Blade Sparkles" (妖怪煌めく, Yōkai Kirameku); 204. "Kagari Advances" (かがり進みて, Kagari Susumite); 205. "Dancing Slice" (瞬斬, Shunzan); 206. "Sharp Practices" (奸計, Kankei); 207. "Izuna's One Second" (イズナの1秒, Izuna no Ichibyō); 208. "Escaping the Sky Mansion" (空屋敷脱出, Sora Yashiki Dasshutsu)
23	March 18, 1995	4-09-123403-8
209. "Simultaneous Advance" (一斉行進, Issei Kōshin); 210. "The Western Bakemono Attack" (西の妖怪総攻撃, Nishi no Bakemono Sōkōgeki); 211. "Hakumen no Mono's Counterattack" (白面の者の反撃, Hakumen no Mono no Hangeki); 212. "Hakumen's Memories" (白面の記憶, Hakumen no Kioku); 213. "Scream of the Beast Spear" (獣の槍絶叫, Kemono no Yari Zekkyō); 214. "Two Powers-Mutual Destruction" (二力相爆, Niriki Sōbaku); 215. "Ending of the War" (退戦, Shisasen); 216. "The Other Side of the Storm" (嵐の彼方, Arashi no Kanata); 217. "The End of the War for a Time" (戦一時終結, Senichiji Shūketsu); Story 35: "Full Moon" (満月, Mangetsu): 218. "Full Moon" (満月, Mangetsu)
24	May 18, 1995	4-09-123404-6
Story 36: "Kagari and Tora Run an Errand" (かがりととらおつかいに, Kagari to Tora Otsukaini): 219. "Kagari and Tora Run an Errand" (かがりととらおつかいに, Kagari to Tora Otsukaini); Story 37: Tatari Breaker: 220. "Kidnapping" (KIDNAPPING～誘拐～, Yūkai); 221. "The H.A.M.M.R. Organization" (H･A･M･M･R～ハマー機関～, Hamā Kikan); 222. "Thunder Metamorphose" (THUNDER METAMORPHOSE～雷妖～, Raiyō); 223. "Examination" (EXAMINATION～調査～, Chōsa); 224. "Baldanders" (BALDANDERS～バルトアンデルス～, Barutoanderusu); 225. "Emergency" (EMERGENCY～緊急事態～, Kinkyūjitai); 226. "Critical Condition" (CRITICAL CONDITION～危険状態～, Kiken Jōtai); 227. "Death Floor" (DEATH FLOOR～死の階～, Shi no Kai)
25	September 18, 1995	4-09-123405-4
228. "The Kirlian Machine Operators" (THE KIRLIAN MACHINE OPERATERS [sic]～キルリアン機操作者～, Kirurianki Sōsasha); 229. "Clash and Destroy" (CLASH AND DESTROY～衝突・破壊～, Shōtotsu Hakai); 230. "Tatari Breaker" (TATARI BREAKER～祟り打ち砕く者, Tatari Uchikudaku); Story 38: "The Sky Reflected in His Eyes" (「あの眸は空を映していた, Ano Hitomi wa Sora O Utsushite Ita): 231. "White Feather" (白羽, Shiraha); 232. "Dog" (犬, Inu); 233. "Tarou" (太郎, Tarō); 234. "Shippeitarou" (しっぺい太郎, Shippeitarō); Story 39: "Gouki" (業鬼, Gōki): 235. "Gouki (1) (業鬼 前編, Gōki Zenpen); 236. "Gouki (2) (業鬼 後編, Gōki Kōhen); Story 40: "Journalist's Soliloquy" (記録者の独白, Kirokusha no Dokuhaku): 237. "Journalist's Soliloquy" (記録者の独白, Kirokusha no Dokuhaku)
26	November 18, 1995	4-09-123406-2
Story 41: "Resurrection of the Beast Horde" (獣群復活, Jūgun Fukkatsu): 238. "Resurrection" (復活, Fukkatsu); 239. "The Gathering Process" (集合過程, Shūgō Katei); 240. "Arrival" (出現, Shutsugen); 241. "Azafuse" (字伏); 242. "Guren" (紅煉); 243. "Grudge" (怨, On); 244. "The Jet Black Horde" (漆黒の群れ, Shikkoku no Mure); Story 42: "Night of the Crescent Moon" (三日月の夜, Mikazuki no Yoru): 245. "Night of the Crescent Moon" (三日月の夜, Mikazuki no Yoru); Story 43: "Before the Wind Blows" (風が吹く前, Kazega Fuku Mae): 246. "Ordinary Scenery" (日常風景, Nichijō Fūkei); 247. "The Wind" (風, Kaze)
27	January 18, 1996	4-09-123407-0
248. "The Wind Blows" (風が吹く, Kazega Fuku); Story 44: "A Season Turning to Stone" (季節石化, Kisetsu Sekka): 249. "The Main Temple" (総本山, Sōhonzan); 250. "Headwind" (逆風, Gyakufū); 251. "Abduction • Pursuit" (拉致・追跡, Rachi Tsuiseki); 252. "The Cause" (原因, Gen'in); 253. "Mayuko Discovered" (真由子発現, Mayuko hatsugen); 254. "To the Divine Forge" (灼熱の炉へ, Shakunetsu no Ro e); 255. "Things I Couldn't Hold on to" (つかめなかったもの, Tsukamenakatta Mono); 256. "Within the Blaze" (炎の中, Honō no Naka); 257. "Black Blaze" (黒炎, Kokuen)
28	March 18, 1996	4-09-123408-9
258. "A One Demon Battle" (単妖戦闘, Tanyō Sentō); 259. "The Crushing Demon Pair" (撃砕双妖, Gekisai Sōyō); Story 45: "Emerging from Rain, Disappearing in Rain" (雨に現れ、雨に消え, Ame ni Araware, Ame ni Kie): 260. "Passing, Disappearing…" (去り、消え…, Sari, Kie…); 261. "Passing, Appearing…" (去り、現る…, Sari, Genru…); 262. "Appearing, Passing…" (現れ、去る…, Araware, Saru…); 263. "Appearing and Appearing Again…" (現れ、そして現れ…, Araware, soshite Araware…); 264. "Progressing Through Rain…" (雨に進み…, Ame ni Susumi…); 265. "To Have and Lose…" (手に入れ、失い…, Te ni Ire, Ushinai…); 266. "Appearing and Destroying…" (現れ、壊し…, Araware, Kowashi…)
29	May 18, 1996	4-09-123409-7
267. "Appearing, Disappearing…" (現われ、消す…, Araware, Kesu…); Story 46: "A Journey Not Homeward" (不帰の旅, Fuki no Tabi): 268. "A Journey Not Homeward" (不帰の旅, Fuki no Tabi); Story 47: "To the Sea of Chaos" (混沌の海へ, Konton no Umi e): 269. "To Okinawa" (沖縄へ, Okinawa e); 270. "Nagare, Obstructing" (流、妨害, Nagare, Bōgai); 271. "The Letter from H.A.M.M.R." (ハマーからの手紙, Hamā Kara no Tegami); 272. "Asako, To Okinawa" (麻子、沖縄へ, Asako, Okinawa e); 273. "To the Sea" (海へ, Umi e); 274. "Nagare vs. Tora (1)" (流対とら 1, Nagare tai Tora Ichi); 275. "Nagare vs. Tora (2)" (流対とら 2, Nagare tai Tora Ni); 276. "Nagare vs. Tora (3)" (流対とら 3, Nagare tai Tora San)
30	August 10, 1996	4-09-123410-0
277. "The Wind That Blows to the Sea" (海に吹く風, Umi ni Fukukaze); Story 48: "Sea of Thunder" (雷鳴の海, Raimei no Umi): 278. "To the Abyss" (深淵にて, Shinen Nite); 279. "Mother" (母, Haha); 280. "The Submerged Stone Pillar" (崩れる岩柱, Kuzureru Iwa Hashira); 281. "The Time of Resurrection" (復活の時, Fukkatsu no Toki); 282. "The Thundering Roar of Its Rise" (轟音の幕開け, Gōon no Makuake); 283. "Fear, on the News" (恐怖、報道さる, Kyōfu, Hōdō Saru); 284. "Breaking Point" (虐, Giyaku); 285. "Break Out" (決裂の時, Ketsuretsu no Toki); 286. "Sea of Hate" (憎しみの海, Nikushimi no Umi)
31	September 18, 1996	4-09-125121-8
287. "4 Minutes 27 Seconds" (四分二十七秒, Yonbunijū Nanabyō); Story 49: "The Beast Spear's Destruction" (獣の槍破壊, Kemono no Yari Hakai): 288. "The Beast Spear's Destruction" (獣の槍破壊, Kemono no Yari Hakai); Story 50: "Tora" (とら): 289. "He Who Returned" (帰還する者Kikan Suru Mono); 290. "Perspective (1)" (遠景1, Enkei Ichi); 291. "Perspective (2)" (遠景2, Enkei Ni); 292. "Perspective (3)" (遠景2, Enkei San); 293. "The Birth of Hakumen" (白面の者誕生, Hakumen no Mono Tanjō); 294. "Vicissitudes Begin" (流転が始まる, Rutenga Hajimaru); Story 51: "Stopping the Descent, Rising Up" (降下停止、浮上, Kōka Teishi, Fujō): 295. "Stopping the Descent" (降下停止, Kōka Teishi)
32	November 18, 1996	4-09-125122-6
296. "Bakemono of Destruction" (破壊妖, Hakaiyō); 297. "Hope" (希望, Kibō); 298. "Memory Recovery" (記憶奪回, Kioku Dakkai); 299. "Stopping the Descent, Rising Up" (降下停止、浮上, Kōka Teishi, Fujō); Story 52: "Rumbling Heavens Opening the Gate" (鳴動天、開門す, Meidōten, Kaimonsu): 300. "The Meikai Gate Again" (冥界の門ふたたび, Meikai no Mon Futatabi); 301. "Opening the Gate" (開門, Kaimon); 302. "The Beast Spear Resurrected" (獣の槍 復活, Kemono no Yari Fukkatsu); Story 53: "To the Promised Night" (約束の夜へ, Yakusoku no Yoru e): 303. "To the Promised Night (1)" (約束の夜へ 前編, Yakusoku no Yoru e Zenpen); 304. "To the Promised Night (2)" (約束の夜へ 後編, Yakusoku no Yoru e Kōhen)
33	December 10, 1996	4-09-125123-4
Story 54: "To the Promised Night" (太陽に 命 とどくまで, Taiyō ni Inochi to Doku Made): 305. "Girl, Not Alighting in Silence" (娘 静かに舞い降りぬ, Musume Shizuka ni Maiorinu); 306. "The Strongest Curse" (最強の悪態, Saikyō no Akutai); 307. "400 Meters" (400メートル, 400 Mētoru); 308. "The Meaning of the Journey" (旅の意味, Tabi no Imi); 309. "The Sun" (太陽, Taiyō); Final Story: "Ushio and Tora" (うしおととら, Ushio to Tora): 310. "The Final Play" (最終局面, Saishū Kyokumen); 311. "Hakumen no Mono" (白面の者); 312. "The Fate of Ushio and Tora" (うしおととらの縁, Ushio to Tora no En)
Gaiden	May 17, 1997	4-09-125124-2
001. "The Tale of the Ayakashi Konjaku" (妖今昔物語, Ayakashi Konjaku); 002. "Tale in the Shadow of Plum Trees: Seal Magician Hyou" (桃影抄～符咒師・ひょう, Momo Kageshō Fujushi Hyō); 003. "Rain Falling on a Village" (星に降る雨, Hoshi ni Furuame); 004. "Thunder Dance" (雷の舞, Kaminari no Mai); 005. "Present" (プレゼント, Purezento); 006. "Day Breaking on an Endless Night" (永夜黎明, Eiya Reimei)
