= Istinja =

Islamic term for cleaning oneself with water after excretion

Istinja is the Islamic term for the action of using water to clean oneself after urinating and/or defecating.

Istinja is sunnah. It means removing whatever has been passed from the genitals or the rectum with water. Toilet paper and other clean implements like stones can be used in addition to water to aid in purifying the area. Istijmar is the equivalent action just using stones, toilet paper, or anything else that is pure without the water. Using any of these is fine but it is obligatory to use one of these.

The aim of this is to remove the impurity and maintain hygiene in accordance with Islamic law and principles.

Water is standard for toilet hygiene within Muslim homes and countries where a series of vessels that carry water, such as the tabo in Maritime Southeast Asia, the buta in West Africa, or lota in the Indian subcontinent and internationally the shattaf are used instead of or in addition to toilet paper.

== Ritual purity ==
The istinja is part of Islamic hygienical jurisprudence and general ritual purity of body and soul in Islam.

The Quran says: "...wherein are men who love to purify themselves. Allah loveth the purifiers."^{[Quran 9:108]}

== See also ==
- Tahir
