= Juan Domingo Cabrera =

Argentine footballer (1952–2007)

Personal information
- Date of birth: 16 June 1952
- Place of birth: Salta, Argentina
- Date of death: 3 September 2007 (aged 55)
- Place of death: Argentina
- Position: Midfielder

Juan Domingo Patricio Cabrera (18 June 1952 — 3 September 2007) was an Argentine professional footballer who played as a midfielder.

On 20 October 1976, while playing for Talleres de Córdoba against Argentinos Juniors in the Argentine Primera División, Cabrera faced 15-year-old Diego Maradona who was making his professional debut. A few minutes into the game, Maradona kicked the ball through Cabrera's legs. Thirty years later, Cabrera remembered: "I was on the right side of the field and went to press him, but he didn't give me a chance. He made the nutmeg and when I turned around, he was far away from me".
