= Ladle (spoon) =

Kitchen utensil

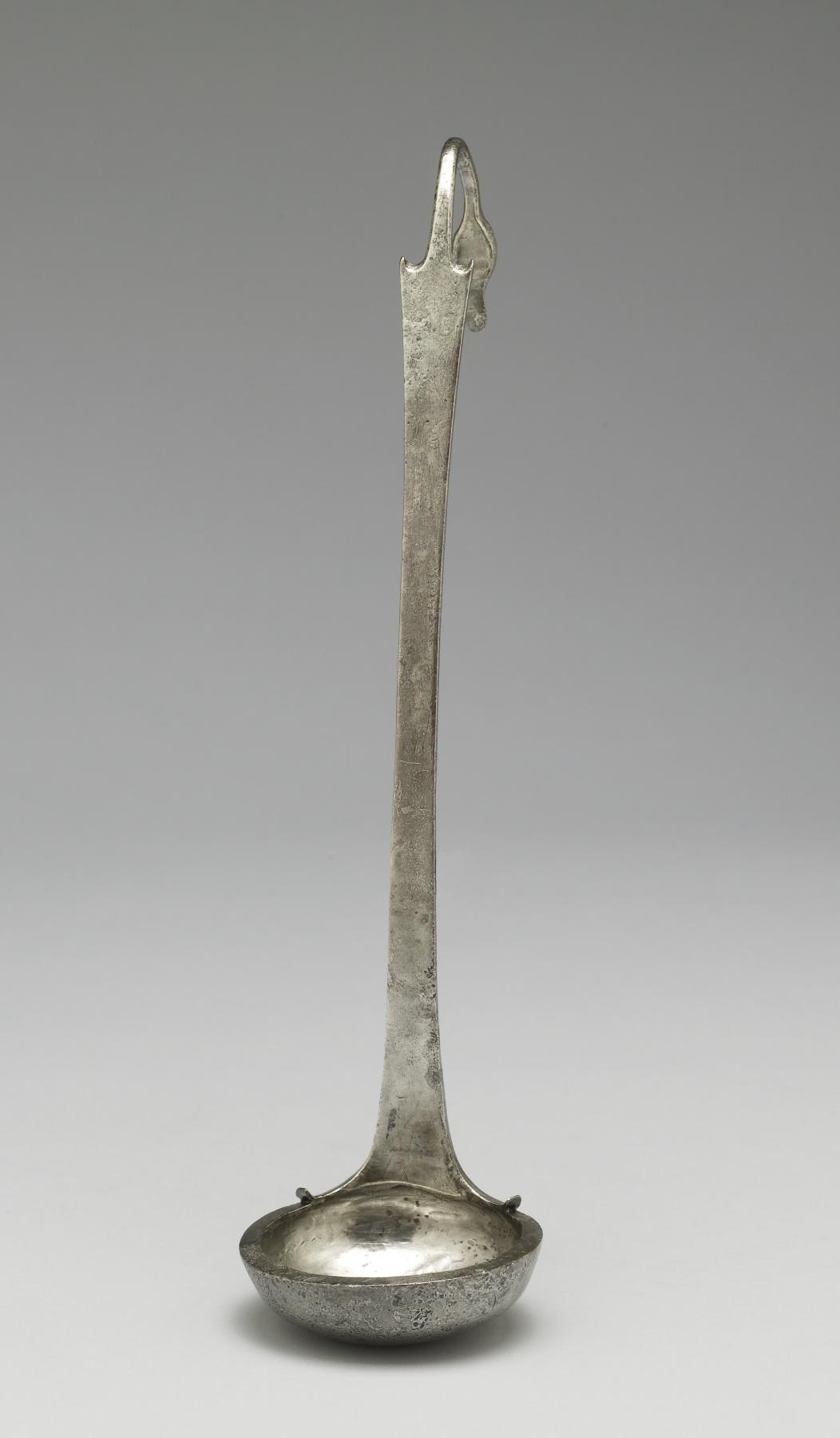
Greek ladle, c. 4th century BC, from the Walters Art Museum

A ladle is a large, deep spoon, often used in the preparation and serving of soup, stew, or other foods.

Although designs vary, a typical ladle has a long handle terminating in a deep bowl, frequently with the bowl oriented at an angle to the handle to facilitate lifting liquid out of a pot or other vessel and conveying it to a bowl. Some ladles have a lip on the side of the ladle's bowl to allow for a finer stream when pouring the liquid; however, this can create difficulty for left-handed users as it is easier to pour towards oneself. Thus, many of these ladles feature such lips on both sides.

In modern times, ladles are usually made of the same stainless steel alloys as other kitchen utensils; however, they can be made of aluminium, silver, plastics, melamine resin, wood, bamboo, or other materials. Ladles are made in a variety of sizes depending upon use; for example, the smaller sizes of less than 5 inches (130 mm) in length are used for sauces or condiments, while extra large sizes of more than 15 inches (380 mm) in length are used for soup or punch.

Ladles are also a part of religious rituals in many cultures. In a Japanese temple, a wooden ladle known as hishaku is used in performing chozu, a ritual required before entering the temple, signifying self-purification.
