= Hishaku =

Tool for scooping water

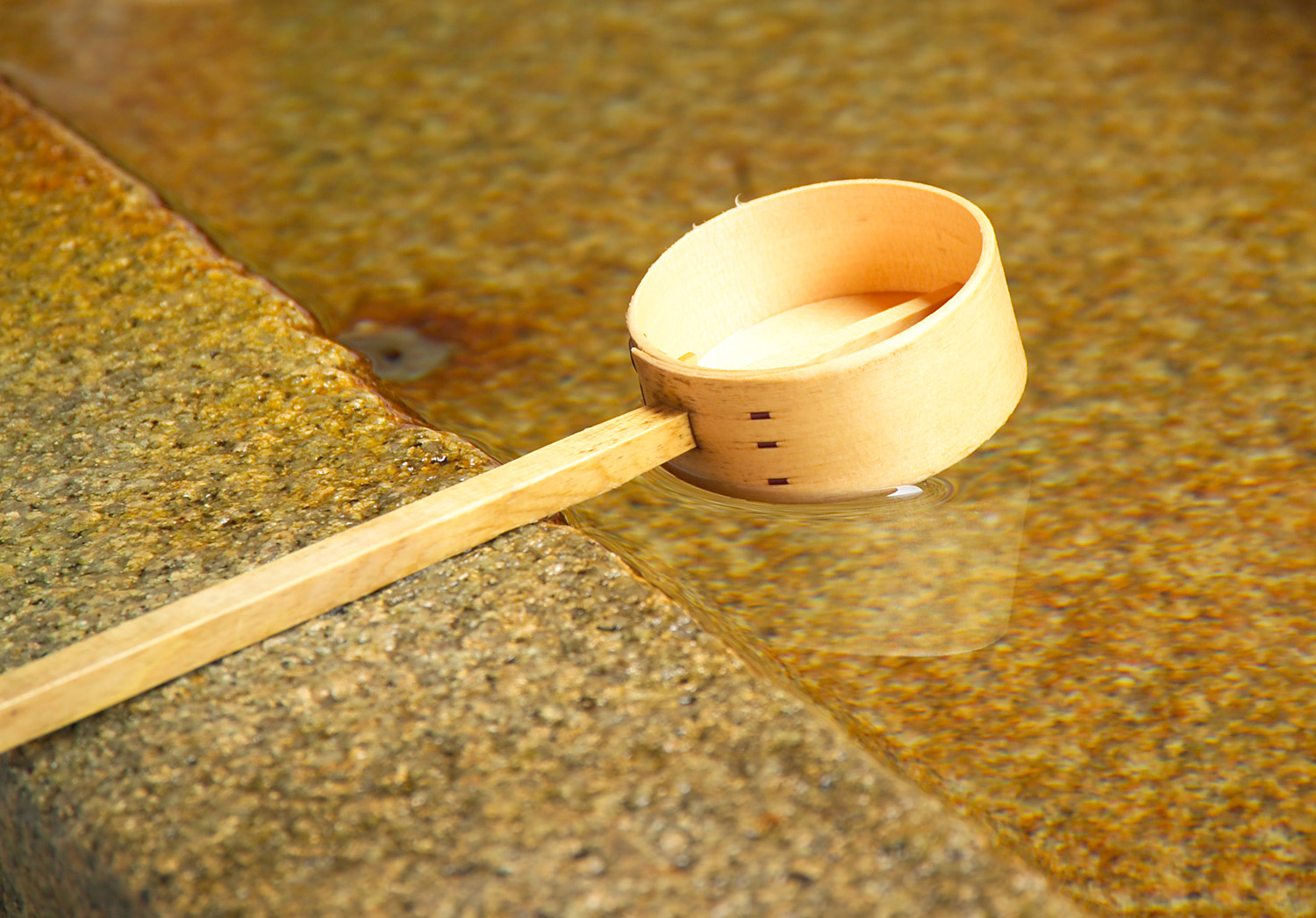
Hishaku (Itsukushima Shrine)

A hishaku (柄杓) is a tool for scooping water or soup native to Japan. It has a vessel shape with a handle.

== Overview ==
Hishaku are generally made of curved objects with handles. In ancient times, they were made of gourd.

Originally, the name "hishaku" was derived from "hisako," which refers to the bottle gourd used since ancient times for scooping water, which became "hisaku," then "hishaku," and then the kanji were chosen by folk etymology. It is also written with the single kanji 斗.

At chōzuya (place for washing hands and rinsing mouths to purify body and soul), hishaku are made of wood or bambuseaes, but there are many different sizes and materials depending on the use and purpose, and some are made of metal or plastic.

The hishaku used for tea ceremony is different in size and length from the general hishaku.

== In culture ==
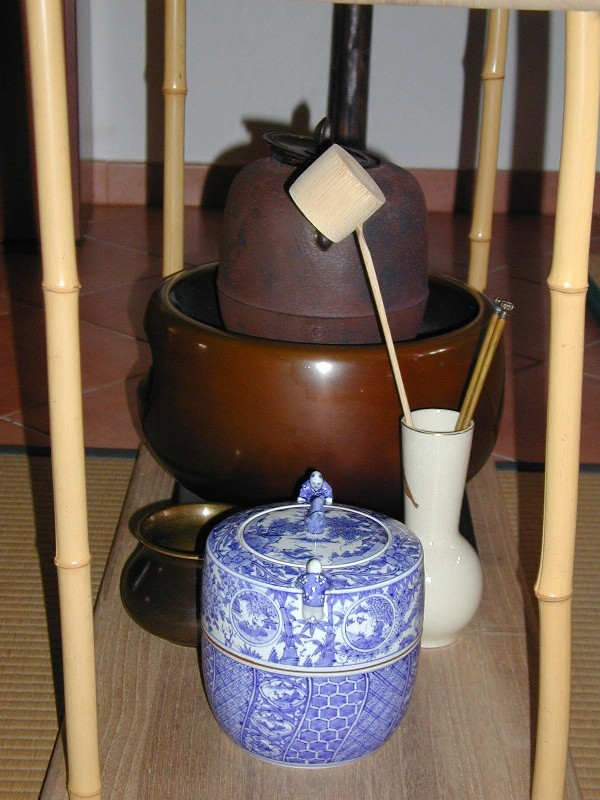
A hishaku found in Japanese tea utensils

- When a Funayūrei appears, it is said that one be saved by handing it a hishaku with a loose bottom.
- A hishaku with a loose bottom is also used for praying for easy childbirth. It is said to mean that the baby will be born as easily as the water drains away.
- Izumo-taisha uses a hishaku made of raw gourd cut into a semicircle with a hemp handle for the offering of sacred water at the Tsume-peeling Festival. This is said to be related to the spiritual power of gourd and hemp.

== See also ==
- Shinto shrine
- Chōzuya
- Tabo (hygiene)
