= Soak =

Soak may refer to:

- Steeping
- Bathing
- Soakage (source of water), a source of water in Australian deserts
- Soak dike, ditch or drain
- Soak testing, a method of system testing in computing and electronics
- Soak (singer), Northern Irish singer-songwriter
- Soak (album), 2013 album by Foetus
- SOAK, a Burning Man regional event in Portland, Oregon, USA

== See also ==
- Soak City (disambiguation)
- Soaked (disambiguation)
- Soaking (disambiguation)
- Soke (disambiguation)
- Souq, a marketplace consisting of multiple small stalls or shops
