= Soaking =

Soaking may refer to:

- Steeping
- Bathing
- Soaking (sexual practice)
- A preparatory operation for tanning in the production of leather
- A discontinued practice to put out a runner in baseball by hitting the runner with a ball thrown by a fielder (see Origins of baseball)

== See also ==
- Soak (disambiguation)
- Soaked (disambiguation)
