= Soke =

Soke may refer to:

- Soke (legal), an early Western jurisdictional concept
- Soke (dance) or eke, a Tongan stick dance, originating from Wallis and Futuna
- Sōke (宗家), a Japanese title meaning "head of the family," and is usually used to denote the headmaster of a school of Japanese martial arts
- Soke of Peterborough, an administrative region of England until 1965
- Söke, a town in the Aydın province of Turkey
- Soké, Canadian music producer

== See also ==
- Soak (disambiguation)
- Souq, an enclosed marketplace
