= Soaked (disambiguation) =

"Soaked" is a 2018 song by Benee.

"Soaked" may also refer to:

- "Soaked", a song by Adam Lambert from the album For Your Entertainment, 2009
- "Soaked", a song by Pinback from the album Summer in Abaddon, 2004
- Soaked!, an expansion pack for the video game RollerCoaster Tycoon 3, 2004

== See also ==
- Soak (disambiguation)
- Soaking (disambiguation)
