= Bathing =

Washing of the body with a liquid

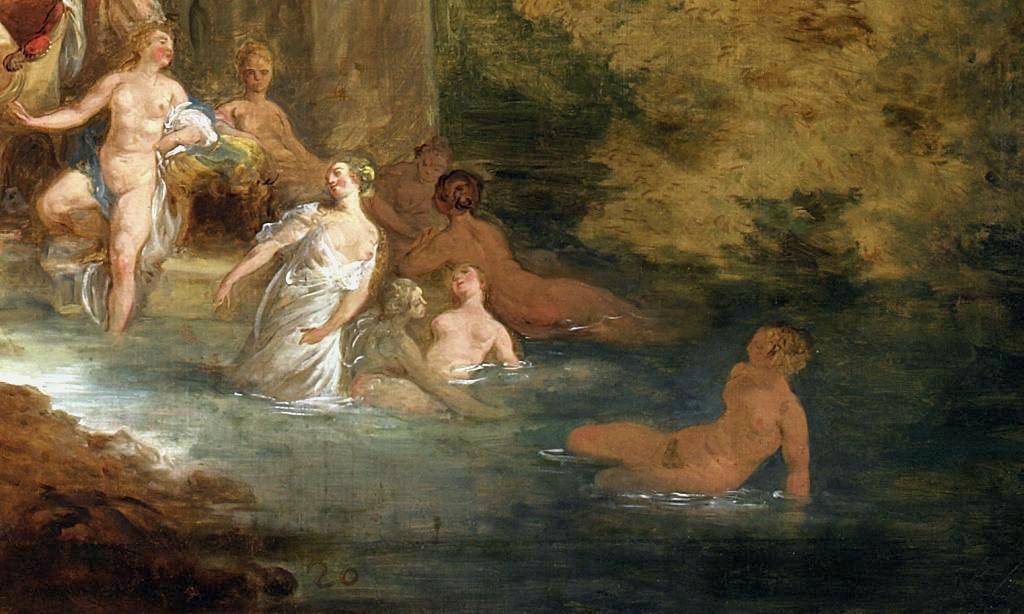
Detail of Jean-Pierre Norblin de La Gourdaine's Bath in the Park (1785)

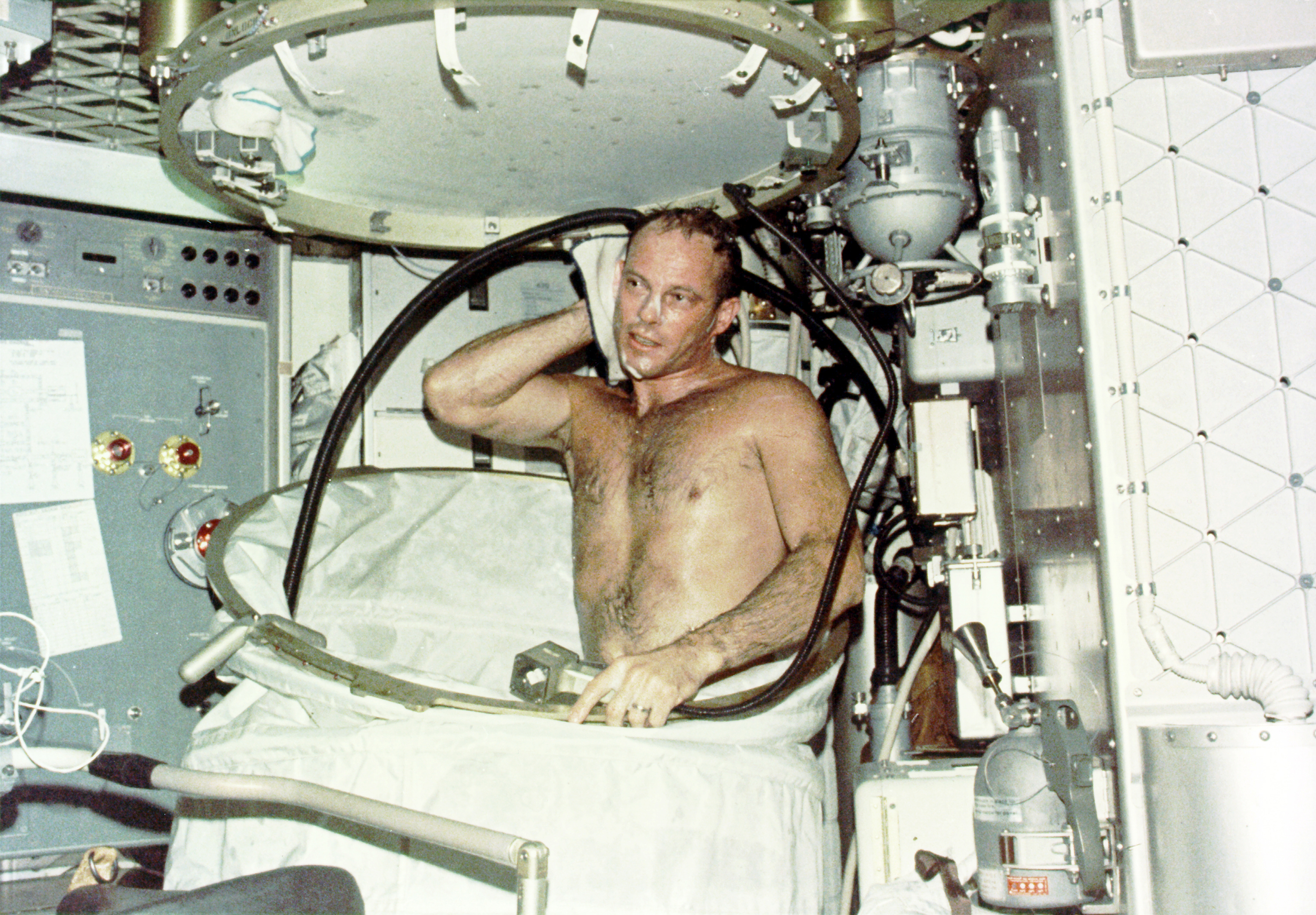
Astronaut Jack R. Lousma taking a shower in space, 1973

Bathing is the immersion of the body, wholly or partially, usually in water, but often in another medium such as hot air. It is most commonly practised as part of personal cleansing, and less frequently for relaxation or as a leisure activity. Cleansing the body may be solely a component of personal hygiene, but is also a spiritual part of some religious rituals. Bathing is also sometimes used medically or therapeutically, as in hydrotherapy, ice baths, or the mud bath.

People bathe in water at temperatures ranging from very cold to very hot, or in appropriately heated air, according to custom or purpose.

Where indoor heated water is available, people bathe more or less daily, at comfortable temperatures, in a private bathtub or shower. Communal bathing, such as that in hammams, sauna, banya, Victorian Turkish baths, and sentō, fulfils the same purpose, in addition to its often having a social function.

Ritual religious bathing is sometimes referred to as immersion. This can be required after sexual intercourse or menstruation (Islam and Judaism), or as baptism (Christianity).

By analogy, the term "bathing" is also applied to relaxing activities in which the participant "bathes" in the rays of the sun (sunbathing) or in outdoor bodies of water, such as in sea bathing or wild swimming.

Although there is sometimes overlap, as in sea bathing, most bathing is usually treated as distinct from more active recreations like swimming.

== History ==
=== Ancient world ===
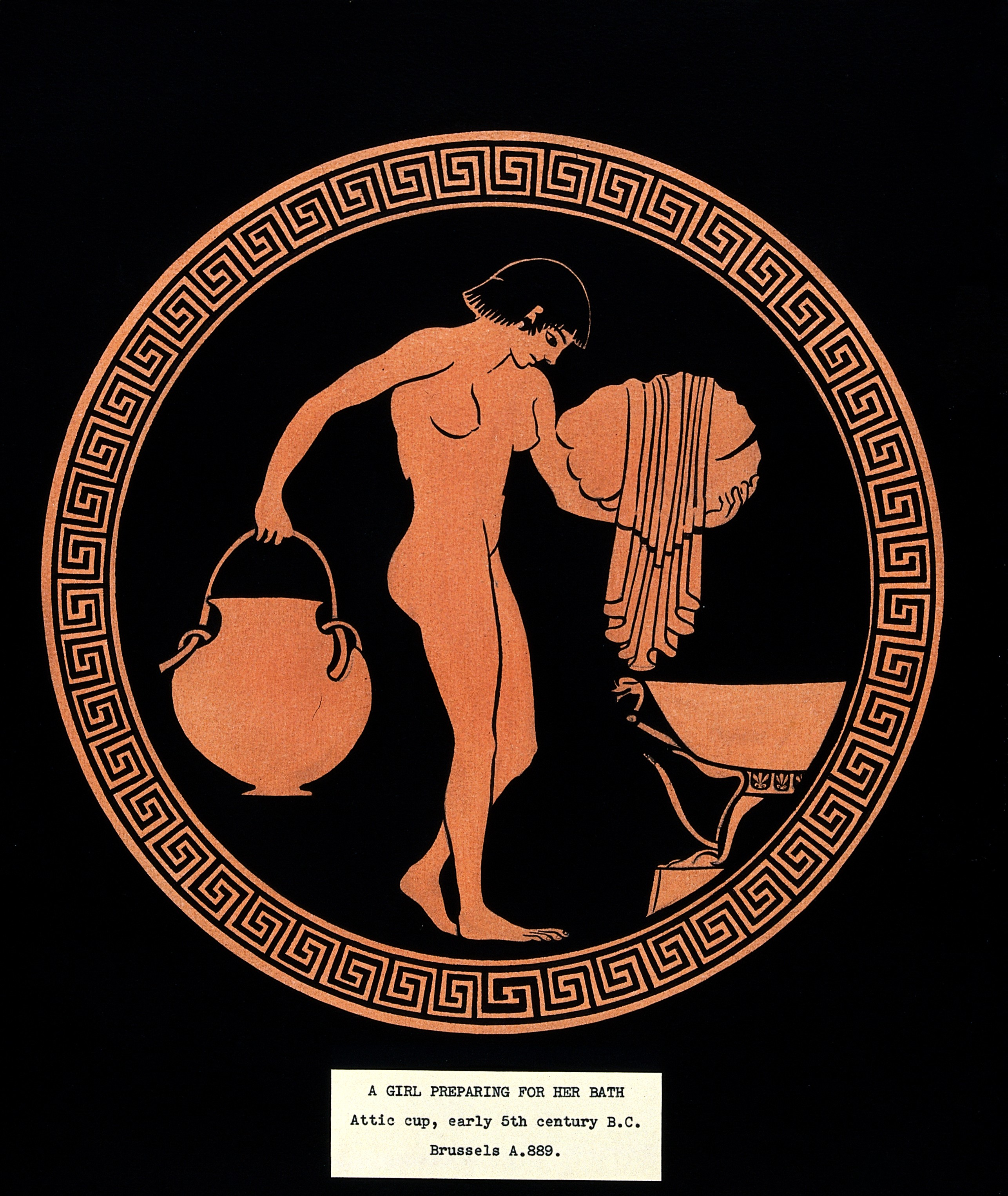
A woman preparing to bathe

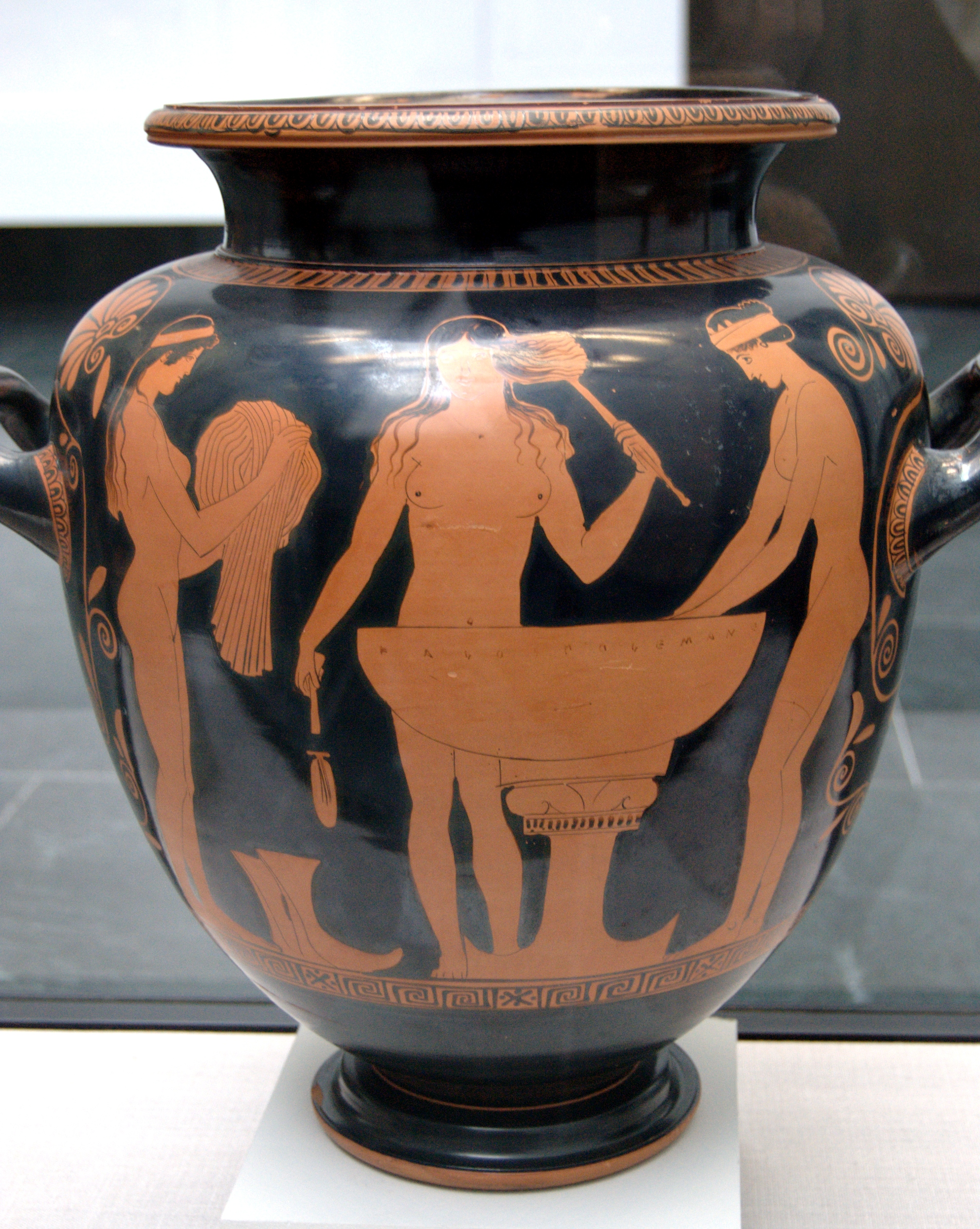
Three young women bathing. Side B from an ancient Greek Attic red-figure stamnos

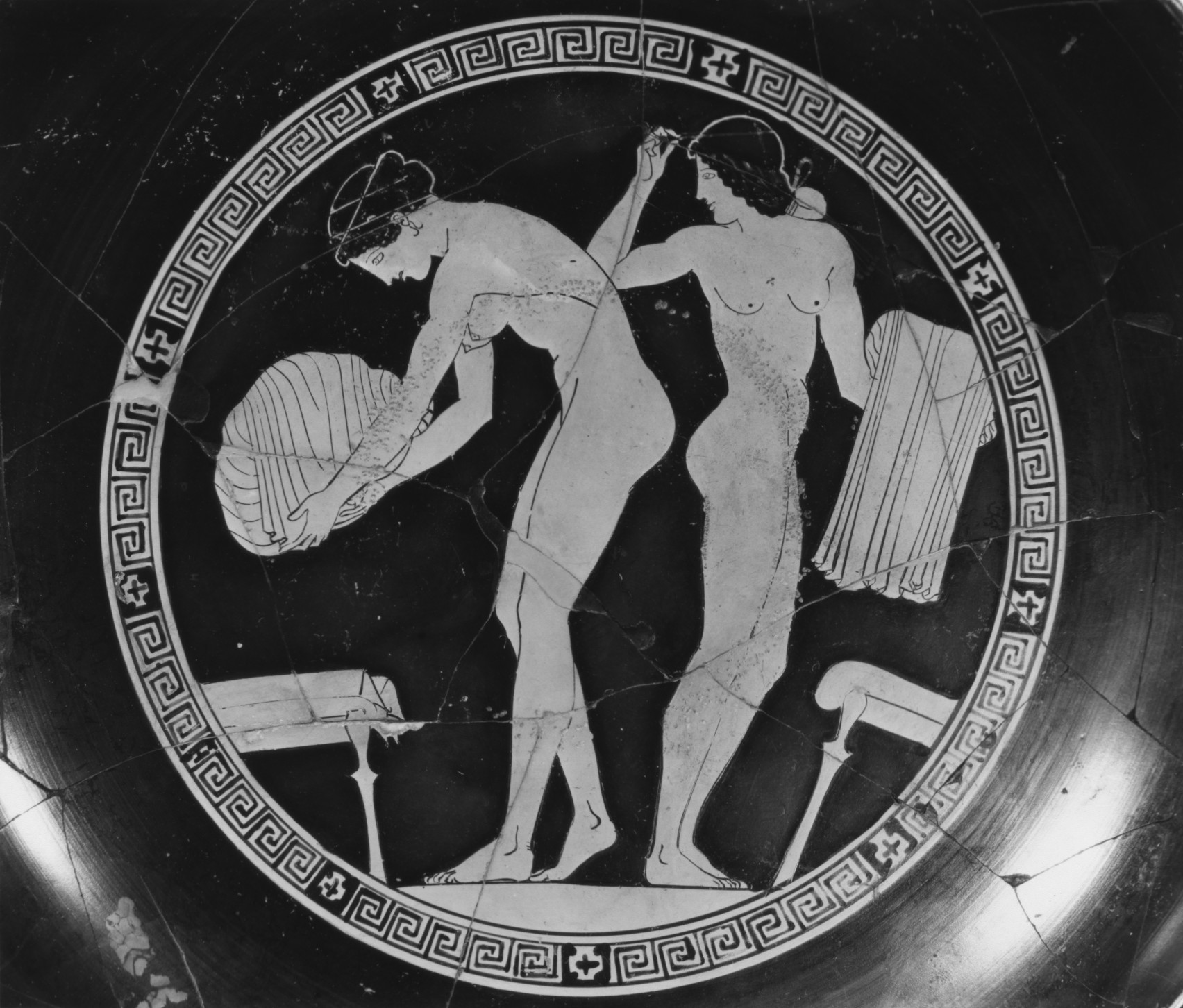
Two women after a bath

Bathing in ancient China may be traced back to the Shang dynasty, 3000 years ago (1600–1046 BCE). Archaeological findings from the Yinxu ruins show a cauldron to boil water, smaller cauldrons to draw out the water to be poured into a basin, skin scrapers to remove dirt and dead skin. Three 2000-year-old baths with exquisite tiles and a sewage system can be seen in Xi'an. Bathing grew in importance in the Han dynasty (202 BC – AD 220) where officials were allowed to take a day's leave for bathing at home every five days, and bathing became the reason for a bank holiday for the first time.

An accountable daily ritual of bathing can be traced to the ancient Indians. They used elaborate practices for personal hygiene with three daily baths and washing. These are recorded in the works called grihya sutras which date back to 500 BCE and are in practice today in some communities. In Hinduism, “Prataha Kaal” (the onset of day) or “Brahma Muhoortham” begins with the 4 am “snanam” or bath, and was considered extremely auspicious in ancient times.

Ancient Greece utilized small bathtubs, wash basins, and foot baths for personal cleanliness. The earliest findings of baths date from the mid-2nd millennium BC in the palace complex at Knossos, Crete, and the luxurious alabaster bathtubs excavated in Akrotiri, Santorini. A word for bathtub, asaminthos (ἀσάμινθος), occurs eleven times in Homer. As a legitimate Mycenaean word (a-sa-mi-to) for a kind of vessel that could be found in any Mycenaean palace, this Linear B term derives from an Aegean suffix -inth- being appended to an Akkadian loan word with the root namsû ('washbowl', 'washing tub'). This luxurious item of the Mycenaean palace culture, therefore, was clearly borrowed from the Near East. Later Greeks established public baths and showers within gymnasiums for relaxation and personal hygiene. The word gymnasium (γυμνάσιον) comes from the Greek word gymnos (γυμνός), meaning "naked".

Ancient Rome developed a network of aqueducts to supply water to all large towns and population centers and had indoor plumbing, with pipes that terminated in homes and at public wells and fountains. The Roman public baths were called thermae. The thermae were not simply baths, but important public works that provided facilities for many kinds of physical exercise and ablutions, with cold, warm, and hot baths, rooms for instruction and debate, and usually one Greek and one Latin library. They also represented an important moment of socialization and exchange between the members of the community. They were provided for the public by a benefactor, usually the Emperor. Other empires of the time did not show such an affinity for public works, but this Roman practice spread their culture to places where there may have been more resistance to foreign mores. Unusually for the time, the thermae were not class-stratified, being available to all for no charge or a small fee. With the fall of the Roman Empire, the aqueduct system fell into disrepair and disuse. But even before that, during the Christianization of the Empire, changing ideas about public morals led the baths into disfavor.

=== Medieval Japan ===
Before the 7th century, the Japanese were likely to have bathed in the many springs in the open, as there is no evidence of closed rooms. In the 6th to 8th centuries (in the Asuka and Nara periods) the Japanese absorbed the religion of Buddhism from China, which had a strong impact on the culture of the entire country. Buddhist temples traditionally included a bathhouse (yuya) for the monks. Due to the principle of purity espoused by Buddhism these baths were eventually opened to the public. Only the wealthy had private baths.

Onna yu (women's bath) (c. 1780–1790), by Torii Kiyonaga

The first public bathhouse was mentioned in 1266. In Edo (modern Tokyo), the first sentō was established in 1591. The early steam baths were called iwaburo (岩風呂 "rock pools") or kamaburo (釜風呂 "furnace baths"). These were built into natural caves or stone vaults. In iwaburo along the coast, the rocks were heated by burning wood, then sea water was poured over the rocks, producing steam. The entrances to these "bath houses" were very small, possibly to slow the escape of the heat and steam. There were no windows, so it was very dark inside and the user constantly coughed or cleared their throats in order to signal to new entrants which seats were already occupied. The darkness could be also used to cover sexual contact. Because there was no gender distinction, these baths came into disrepute. They were finally abolished in 1870 on hygienic and moral grounds. According to author John Gallagher, bathing "was segregated in the 1870s as a concession to outraged Western tourists".

At the beginning of the Edo period (1603–1868) there were two different types of baths. In Edo, hot-water baths ('湯屋 yuya) were common, while in Osaka, steam baths (蒸風呂 mushiburo) were common. At that time shared bathrooms for men and women were the rule. These bathhouses were very popular, especially for men. "Bathing girls" (湯女 yuna) were employed to scrub the guests' backs and wash their hair, etc. In 1841, the employment of yuna was generally prohibited, as well as mixed bathing. The segregation of the sexes, however, was often ignored by operators of bathhouses, or areas for men and women were separated only by a symbolic line. Today, sento baths have separate rooms for men and women.

=== Mesoamerica ===
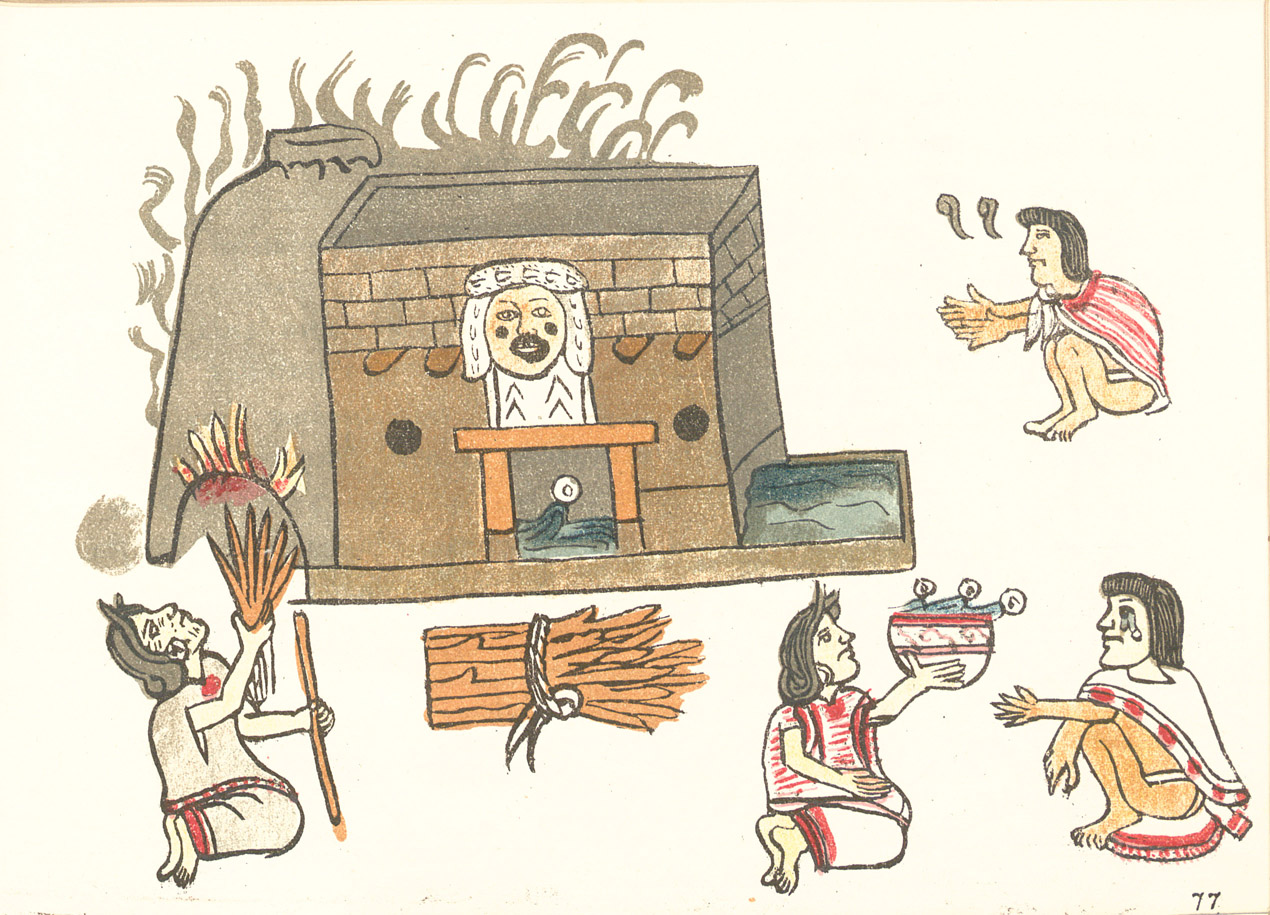
Codex Magliabechiano from the Loubat collection, 1904

Spanish chronicles describe the bathing habits of the peoples of Mesoamerica during and after the conquest. Bernal Díaz del Castillo describes Moctezuma (the Mexica, or Aztec, king at the arrival of Cortés) in his Historia verdadera de la conquista de la Nueva España as being "...Very neat and cleanly, bathing every day each afternoon...". Bathing was not restricted to the elite, but was practised by all people; the chronicler Tomás López Medel wrote after a journey to Central America that "Bathing and the custom of washing oneself is so quotidian (common) amongst the Indians, both of cold and hot lands, as is eating, and this is done in fountains and rivers and other water to which they have access, without anything other than pure water..."

The Mesoamerican bath, known as temazcal in Spanish, from the Nahuatl word temazcalli, a compound of temaz ("steam") and calli ("house"), consists of a room, often in the form of a small dome, with an exterior firebox known as texictle (teʃict͜ɬe) that heats a small portion of the room's wall made of volcanic rocks; after this wall has been heated, water is poured on it to produce steam, an action known as tlasas. As the steam accumulates in the upper part of the room a person in charge uses a bough to direct the steam to the bathers who are lying on the ground, with which he later gives them a massage, then the bathers scrub themselves with a small flat river stone and finally the person in charge introduces buckets with water with soap and grass used to rinse. This bath had also ritual importance, and was vinculated to the goddess Toci; it is also therapeutic when medicinal herbs are used in the water for the tlasas. It is still used in Mexico.

=== Medieval and early-modern Europe ===
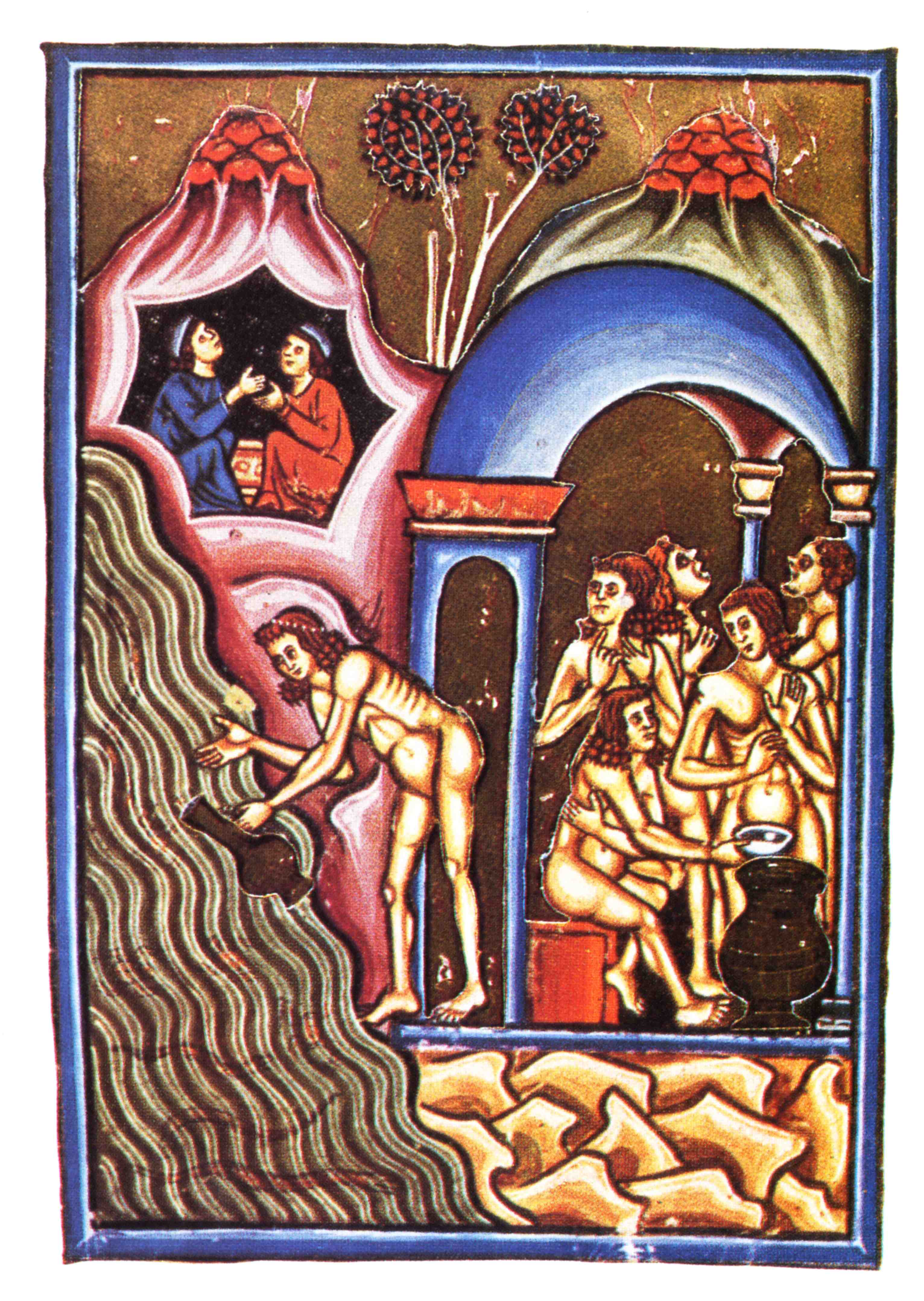
A sweat bath: illumination from Peter of Eboli, De Balneis Puteolanis ("The Baths of Pozzuoli"), written in the early 13th century

Christianity has always placed a strong emphasis on hygiene. Despite the denunciation of the mixed bathing style of Roman pools by early Christian clergy, as well as the pagan custom of women bathing naked in front of men, this did not stop the Church from urging its followers to go to public baths for bathing, which contributed to hygiene and good health according to the Church Fathers, Clement of Alexandria and Tertullian. The Church also built public bathing facilities that were separate for both sexes near monasteries and pilgrimage sites; also, the popes situated baths within church basilicas and monasteries since the early Middle Ages. Pope Gregory the Great urged his followers on the value of bathing as a bodily need.

Great bathhouses were built in Byzantine centers such as Constantinople and Antioch, and the popes allocated to the Romans bathing through diaconia, or private Lateran baths, or even a myriad of monastic bath houses functioning in the eighth and ninth centuries. The Popes maintained baths in their residences which were described by scholar Paolo Squatriti as "luxurious baths", and bath houses including hot baths were incorporated into Christian Church buildings or those of monasteries, which were known as "charity baths" because they served both the clerics and needy poor people. Public bathing was common in larger towns and cities such as Paris, Regensburg and Naples. The Catholic religious orders of the Augustinians and Benedictines had rules for ritual purification, and inspired by Benedict of Nursia encouraged the practice of therapeutic bathing; Benedictine monks played a role in the development and promotion of spas. Protestantism also played a prominent role in the development of the British spas.

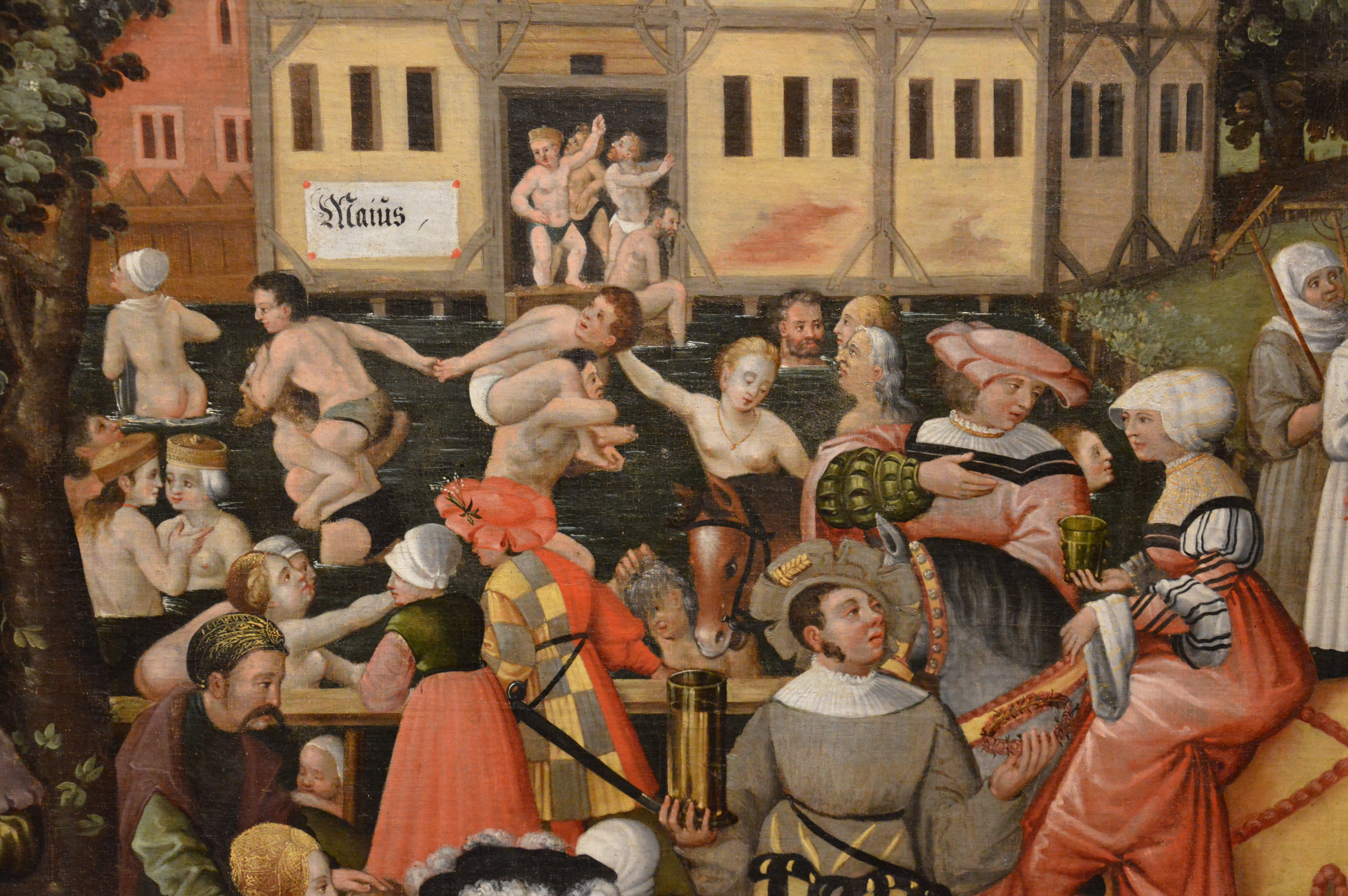
Public bathing in Augsburg, by Jörg Breu the Elder, c. 1531

In the Middle Ages, bathing commonly took place in public bathhouses. Public baths were also havens for prostitution, which created some opposition to them. Rich people bathed at home, most likely in their bedroom, as "bath" rooms were not common. Bathing was done in large, wooden tubs with a linen cloth laid in it to protect the bather from splinters. Additionally, during the Renaissance and Protestant Reformation, the quality and condition of the clothing (as opposed to the actual cleanliness of the body itself) were thought to reflect the soul of an individual. Clean clothing also reflected one's social status; clothes made the man or woman.

Due to Black Death plague, introduced from Asia to Europe, public baths were closed to avoid contagion. In the sixteenth century, the popularity of public bathhouses in Europe sharply declined, perhaps due to the new plague of syphilis which made sexual promiscuity more risky, or stronger religious prohibitions on nudity surrounding the Protestant Reformation. Some Europeans came to believe the false idea that bathing or steaming would open pores to disease.

=== Modern era ===
==== Therapeutic bathing ====
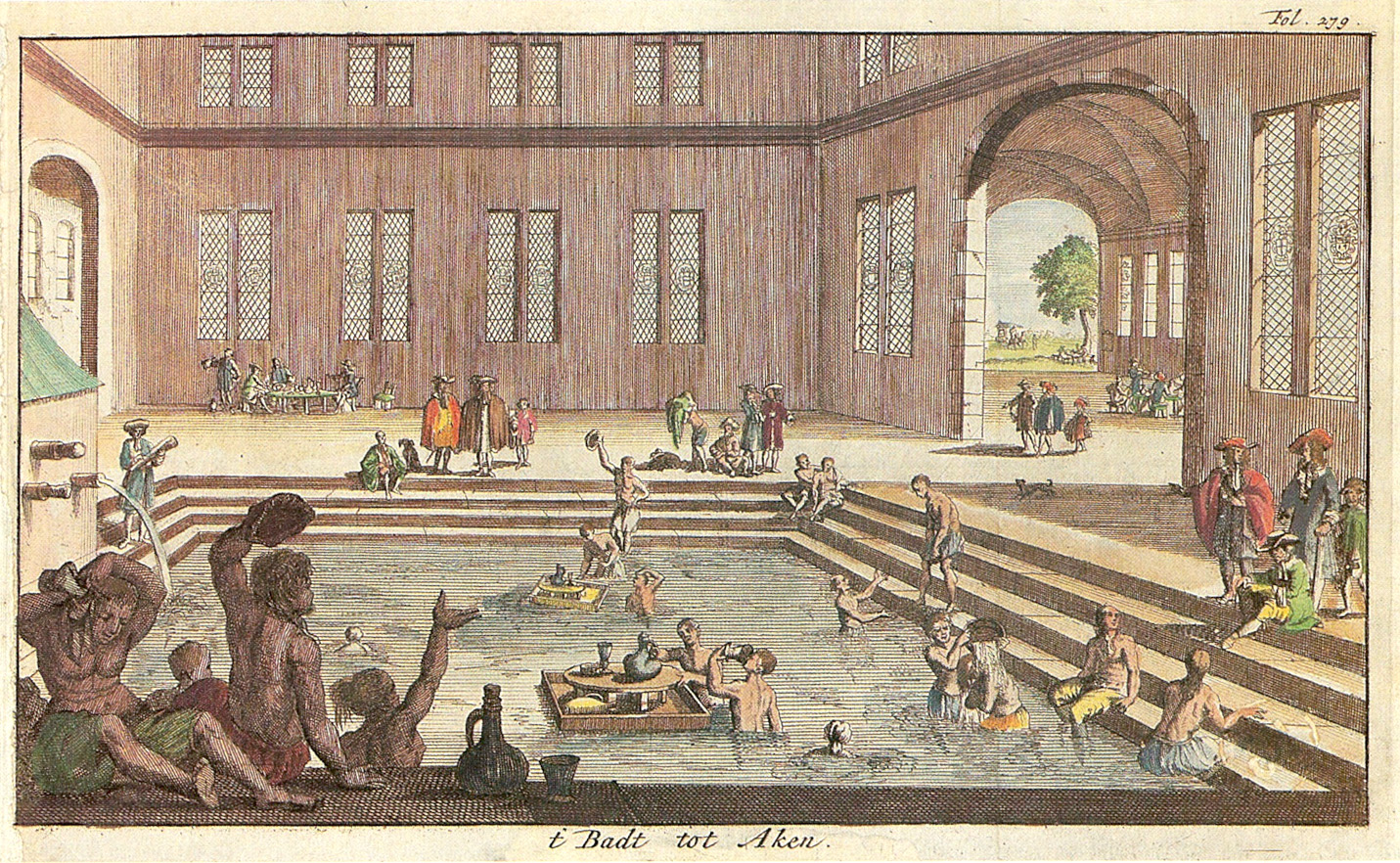
Hot springs at Aachen, Germany, 1682

Hydropathic applications according to Claridge's Hydropathy book.

Public opinion about bathing began to shift in the middle and late 18th century, when writers argued that frequent bathing might lead to better health. Two English works on the medical uses of water were published in the 18th century that inaugurated the new fashion for therapeutic bathing. One of these was by Sir John Floyer, a physician of Lichfield, who, struck by the remedial use of certain springs by the neighbouring peasantry, investigated the history of cold bathing and published a book on the subject in 1702. The book ran through six editions within a few years and the translation of this book into German was largely drawn upon by Dr J. S. Hahn of Silesia as the basis for his book called On the Healing Virtues of Cold Water, Inwardly and Outwardly Applied, as Proved by Experience, published in 1738.

The other work was a 1797 publication by Dr James Currie of Liverpool on the use of hot and cold water in the treatment of fever and other illness, with a fourth edition published not long before his death in 1805. It was also translated into German by Michaelis (1801) and Hegewisch (1807). It was highly popular and first placed the subject on a scientific basis. Hahn's writings had meanwhile created much enthusiasm among his countrymen, societies having been everywhere formed to promote the medicinal and dietetic use of water; in 1804 Professor E.F.C. Oertel of Anspach republished them and quickened the popular movement by the unqualified commendation of water drinking as a remedy for all diseases.

A popular revival followed the application of hydrotherapy around 1829, by Vincenz Priessnitz, a peasant farmer in Gräfenberg, then part of the Austrian Empire. This revival was continued by a Bavarian priest, Sebastian Kneipp (1821–1897), "an able and enthusiastic follower" of Priessnitz, "whose work he took up where Priessnitz left it", after he read a treatise on the cold water cure. In Wörishofen (south Germany), Kneipp developed the systematic and controlled application of hydrotherapy for the support of medical treatment that was delivered only by doctors at that time. Kneipp's own book My Water Cure was published in 1886 with many subsequent editions, and translated into many languages.

Captain R. T. Claridge was responsible for introducing and promoting hydropathy in Britain, first in London in 1842, then with lecture tours in Ireland and Scotland in 1843. His 10-week tour in Ireland included Limerick, Cork, Wexford, Dublin and Belfast, over June, July and August 1843, with two subsequent lectures in Glasgow.

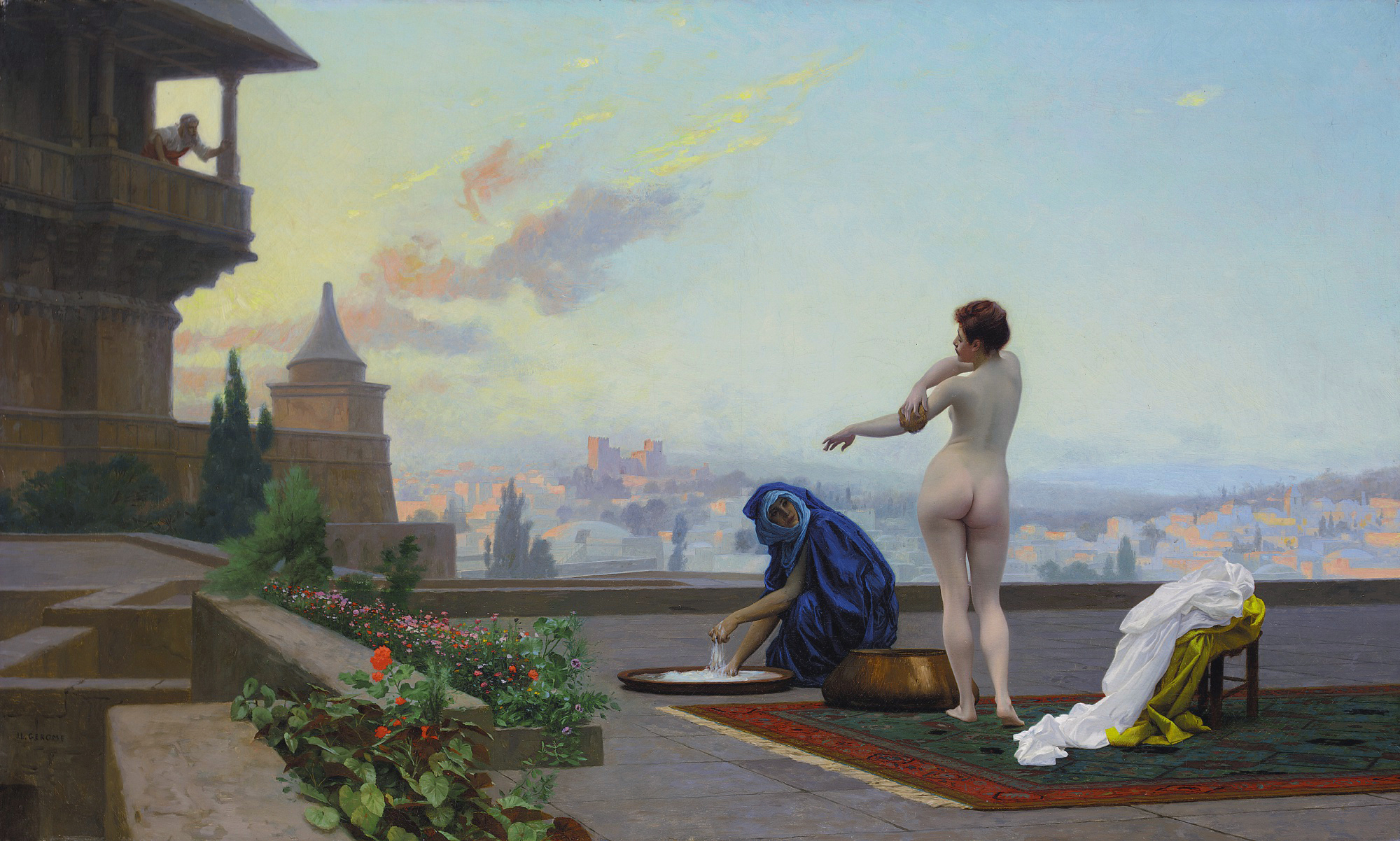
Painting by Jean-Léon Gérôme of Bathsheba bathing while being watched by King David

The acceptance of germ theory in the late 1800s provided scientific reasons for frequent bathing.

==== Public baths and wash-houses ====
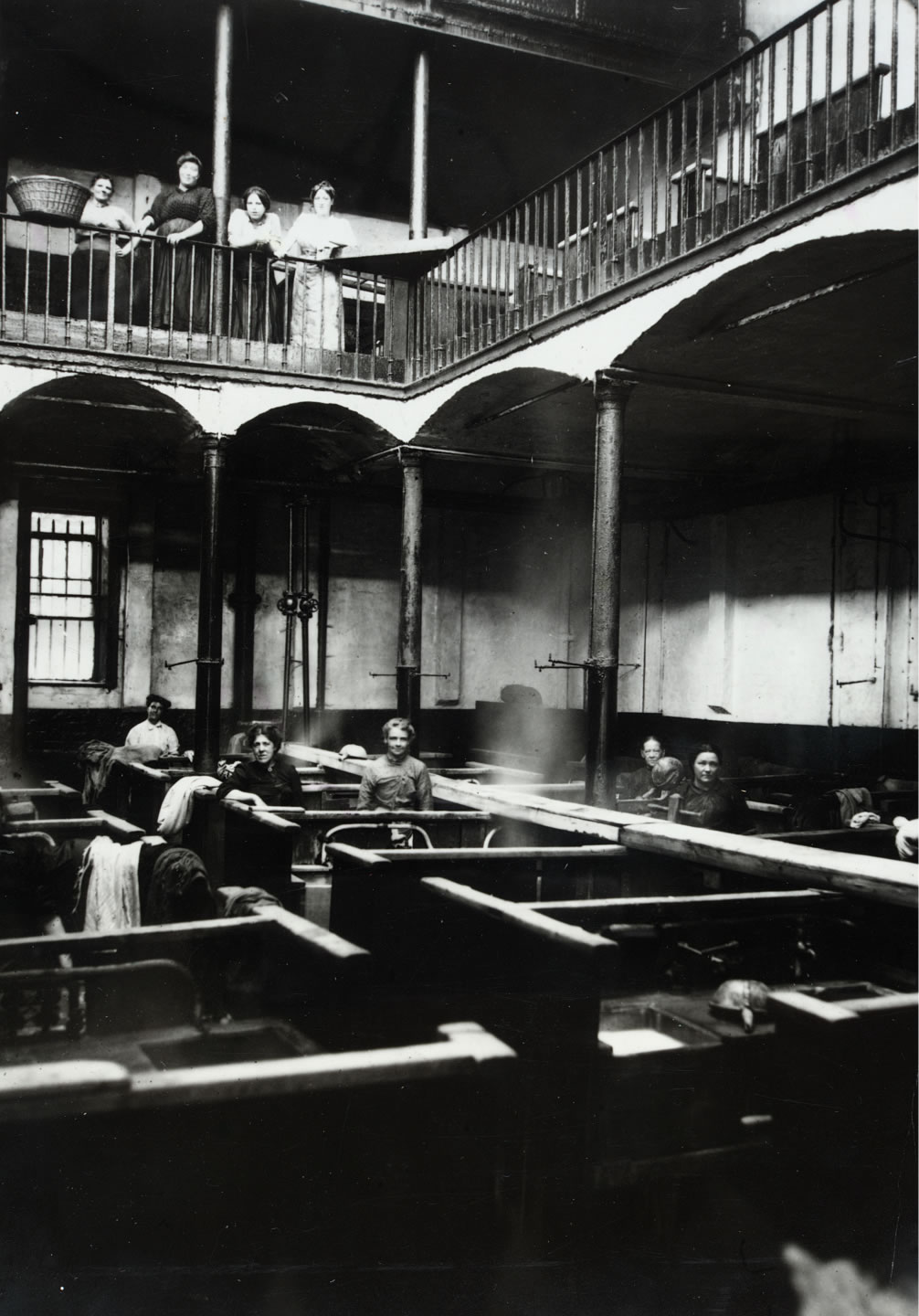
Interior of Liverpool wash house, the first public wash house in England

Large public baths such as those found in the ancient world and the Ottoman Empire were revived during the 19th century. The first modern public baths were opened in Liverpool in 1829. The first known warm fresh-water public wash house was opened in May 1842.

The popularity of wash-houses was spurred by the newspaper interest in Kitty Wilkinson, an Irish immigrant "wife of a labourer" who became known as the Saint of the Slums. In 1832, during a cholera epidemic, Wilkinson took the initiative to offer the use of her house and yard to neighbours to wash their clothes, at a charge of a penny per week, and showed them how to use a chloride of lime (bleach) to get them clean. She was supported by the District Provident Society and William Rathbone. In 1842, Wilkinson was appointed baths superintendent.

In Birmingham, around ten private baths were available in the 1830s. Whilst the dimensions of the baths were small, they provided a range of services. A major proprietor of bath houses in Birmingham was a Mr. Monro who had had premises in Lady Well and Snow Hill. Private baths were advertised as having healing qualities and being able to cure people of diabetes, gout and all skin diseases, amongst others. On 19 November 1844, it was decided that the working class members of society should have the opportunity to access baths, in an attempt to address the health problems of the public. On 22 April and 23 April 1845, two lectures were delivered in the town hall urging the provision of public baths in Birmingham and other towns and cities.

After a period of campaigning by many committees, the Public Baths and Wash-houses Act received royal assent on 26 August 1846. The act empowered local authorities across the country to incur expenditure in constructing public swimming baths out of its own funds.

The first London public baths was opened at Goulston Square, Whitechapel, in 1847 with the Prince consort laying the foundation stone.

==== Soap promoted for personal cleanliness ====
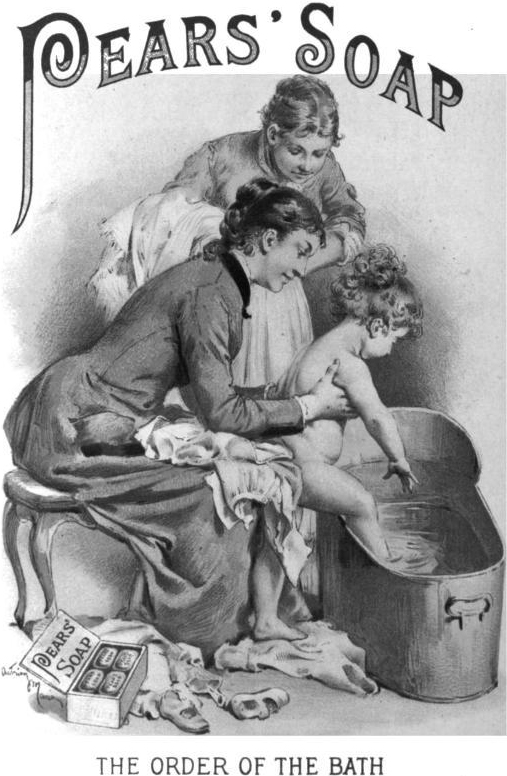
"The order of the bath" Pears soap advertisement in 1889, a reference to the Order of the Bath. Soap reached a mass market as the middle class adopted a greater interest in cleanliness.

By the mid-19th century, the English urbanised middle classes had formed an ideology of cleanliness that ranked alongside typical Victorian concepts, such as Christianity, respectability and social progress. The cleanliness of the individual became associated with his or her moral and social standing within the community and domestic life became increasingly regulated by concerns regarding the presentation of domestic sobriety and cleanliness.

The industry of soapmaking began on a small scale in the 1780s, with the establishment of a soap manufactory at Tipton by James Keir and the marketing of high-quality, transparent soap in 1789 by Andrew Pears of London. In 1807, Pears found a way of removing the impurities and refining the base soap before adding the delicate perfume of garden flowers, founding Pears soap. It was in the mid-19th century, though, that the large-scale consumption of soap by the middle classes, anxious to prove their social standing, drove forward the mass production and marketing of soap.

William Gossage produced low-priced, good-quality soap from the 1850s. William Hesketh Lever and his brother, James, bought a small soap works in Warrington in 1886 and founded what is still one of the largest soap businesses, formerly called Lever Brothers and now called Unilever. These soap businesses were among the first to employ large-scale advertising campaigns. In 1882, English actress and socialite Lillie Langtry became the poster-girl for Pears soap, and thus the first celebrity to endorse a commercial product.

Before the late 19th century, water to individual places of residence was rare. Many countries in Europe developed a water collection and distribution network. London water supply infrastructure developed through major 19th-century treatment works built in response to cholera threats, to modern large-scale reservoirs. By the end of the century, private baths with running hot water were increasingly common in affluent homes in America and Britain.

At the beginning of the 20th century, a weekly Saturday night bath had become common custom for most of the population. A half day's work on Saturday for factory workers allowed them some leisure to prepare for the Sunday day of rest. The half day off allowed time for the considerable labor of drawing, carrying, and heating water, filling the bath and then afterward emptying it. To economize, bath water was shared by all family members. Indoor plumbing became more common in the 20th century and commercial advertising campaigns pushing new bath products began to influence public ideas about cleanliness, promoting the idea of a daily shower or bath.

In the 21st century, challenges to the need for soap to effect such everyday cleanliness and whether soap is needed to avoid body odor appeared in media.

=== Hot-air baths ===
==== Hammam ====
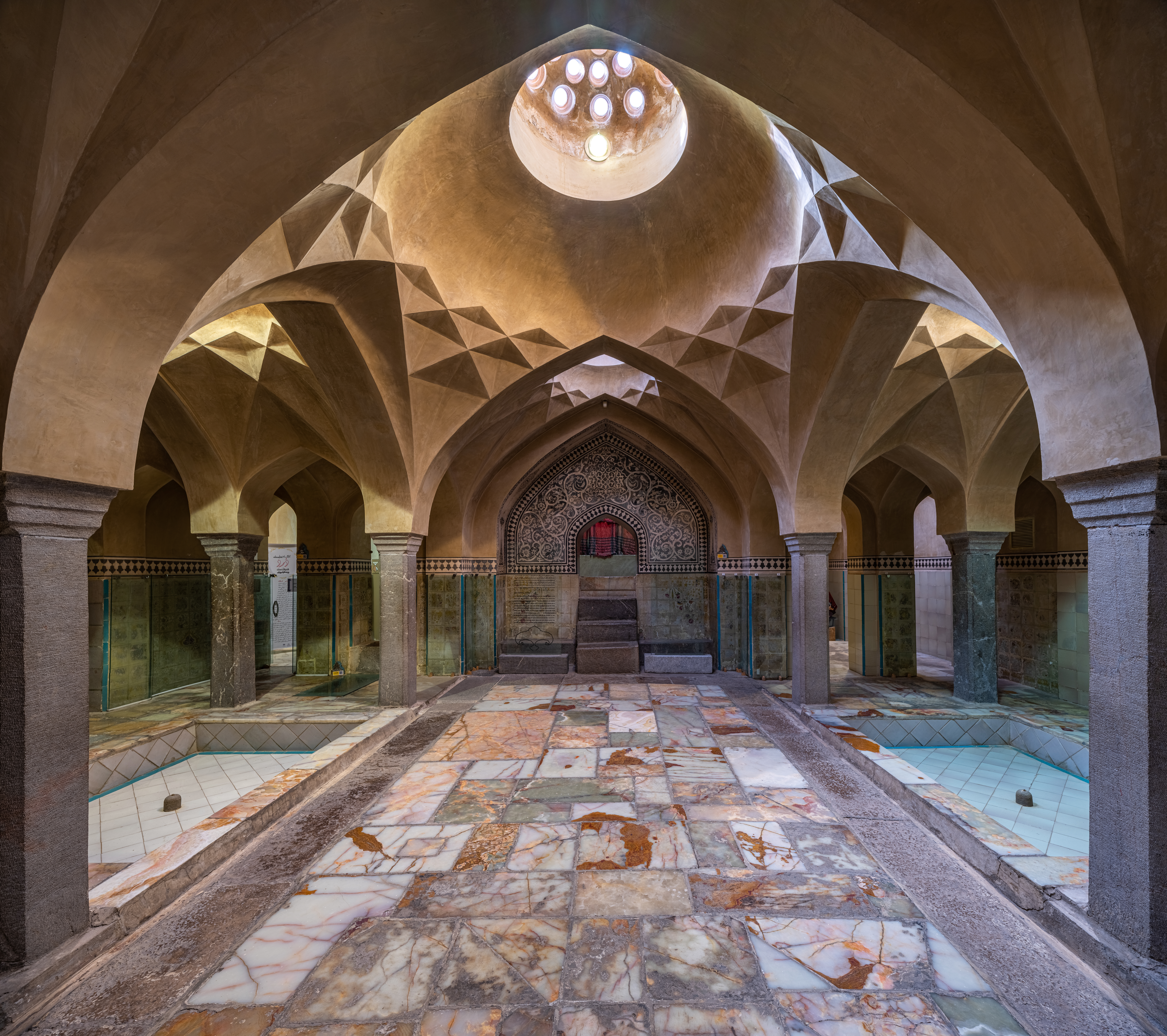
Ali Gholi Agha hammam, Isfahan, Iran

A hammam (Note: Arabic: حمّام, romanized: ḥammām, Turkish: hamam) is a type of steam bath or a place of public bathing associated with the Islamic world. It is a prominent feature in the culture of the Muslim world and was inherited from the model of the Roman thermae. Muslim bathhouses or hammams were historically found across the Middle East, North Africa, al-Andalus (Islamic Spain and Portugal), Central Asia, the Indian subcontinent, and in Southeastern Europe under Ottoman rule.

In Islamic cultures the significance of the hammam was both religious and civic: it provided for the needs of ritual ablutions but also provided for general hygiene in an era before private plumbing and served other social functions such as offering a gendered meeting place for men and for women. Archeological remains attest to the existence of bathhouses in the Islamic world as early as the Umayyad period (7th–8th centuries) and their importance has persisted up to modern times. Their architecture evolved from the layout of Roman and Greek bathhouses and featured a regular sequence of rooms: an undressing room, a cold room, a warm room, and a hot room. Heat was produced by furnaces which provided hot water and steam, while smoke and hot air was channeled through conduits under the floor.

In a modern hammam visitors undress themselves, while retaining some sort of modesty garment or loincloth, and proceed into progressively hotter rooms, inducing perspiration. They are then usually washed by male or female staff (matching the gender of the visitor) with the use of soap and vigorous rubbing, before ending by washing themselves in warm water. Unlike in Roman or Greek baths, bathers usually wash themselves with running water instead of immersing themselves in standing water since this is a requirement of Islam, though immersion in a pool used to be customary in the hammams of some regions such as Iran. While hammams everywhere generally operate in fairly similar ways, there are some regional differences both in usage and architecture.

==== Victorian Turkish baths ====
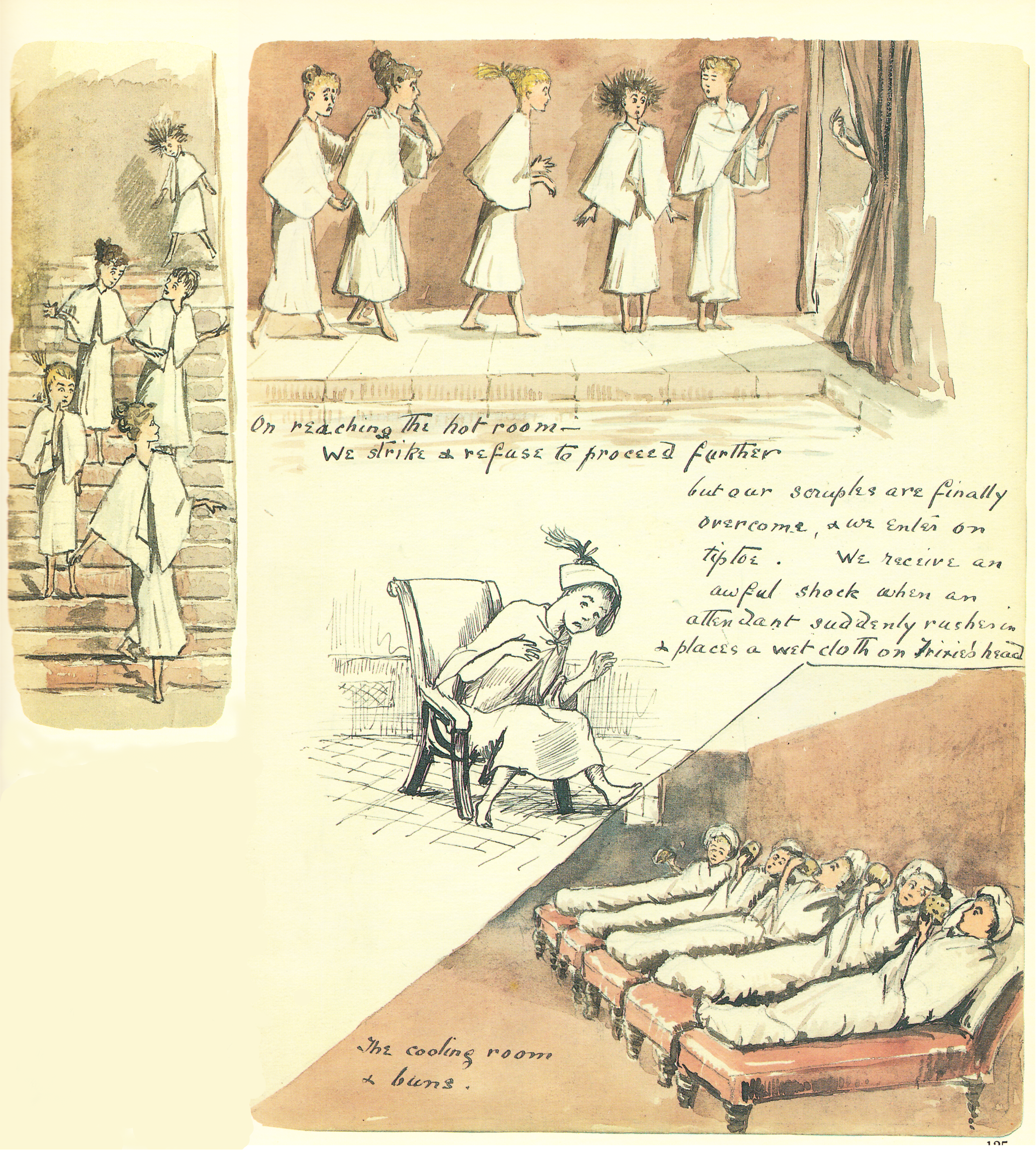
Maud and friends visit a London Turkish bath, 1892

Victorian Turkish baths (inspired by the traditional Islamic bathhouse—the hammam—itself an adaptation of the ancient Roman baths) were introduced to Britain by David Urquhart, diplomat and sometime Member of Parliament for Stafford. He wanted, for political and personal reasons, to popularize Turkish culture in Britain. In 1850 he wrote The Pillars of Hercules, a book about his travels in 1848 through Spain and Morocco. He described the vaporous hot-air baths (little-changed since Roman times) which he visited, both there and in the Ottoman Empire. In 1856 Dr Richard Barter read Urquhart's book and worked with him to construct such a bath, intending to use it at his hydropathic establishment at St Ann(e)'s Hill, near Blarney, County Cork, Ireland. Barter realised that the human body could tolerate the more therapeutically effective higher temperatures in hot air which was dry rather than steamy. After a number of unsuccessful attempts, he opened the first modern bath of this type in 1856. He called it the "Improved" Turkish or Irish bath, now better known as the Victorian Turkish bath.

The following year, the first public bath of its type to be built in mainland Britain since Roman times was opened in Manchester, and the others followed in quick succession. In July 1860, Roger Evans, a member of one of Urquhart's Foreign Affairs Committees, opened London's first such bath at 5 Bell Street, near Marble Arch. During the following 150 years, over 700 Victorian or Victorian-style Turkish baths opened in the British Isles, including those built by municipal authorities as part of swimming pool complexes. It was claimed by Durham Dunlop (and many others) that hot-air bathing was a more effective body-cleanser than water, while Richard Metcalfe meticulously calculated that it would be more cost-effective for local authorities to provide hot-air baths in place of slipper baths.

Victorian Turkish baths soon opened around the British Empire, Dr. John Le Gay Brereton opening the first in Sydney, Australia in 1859, Canada had one by 1869, and the first in New Zealand opened in 1874. Urquhart's influence was also felt outside the Empire when in 1861, Dr Charles H. Shepard opened the first in the United States at 63 Columbia Street, Brooklyn Heights, New York, most probably on 3 October 1863.

== Purpose ==
One purpose of bathing is for personal hygiene. It is a means of achieving cleanliness by washing away dead skin cells, dirt, and soil and as a preventative measure to reduce the incidence and spread of disease. It also may reduce body odors, however, some people note that may not be so necessary as commonly thought.

Bathing creates a feeling of well-being and the physical appearance of cleanliness.

Bathing may also be practised for religious ritual or therapeutic purposes or as a recreational activity. Bathing may be used to cool or to warm the body of an individual.

Therapeutic use of bathing includes hydrotherapy, healing, rehabilitation from injury or addiction, and relaxation.

The use of a bath in religious ritual or ceremonial rites include immersion during baptism in Christianity and to achieve a state of ritual cleanliness in a mikvah in Judaism. It is referred to as Ghusl in Arabic to attain ceremonial purity (Taahir) in Islam. All major religions place an emphasis on ceremonial purity, and bathing is one of the primary means of attaining outward purity. In Hindu households, any acts of defilement are countered by undergoing a bath and Hindus also immerse in Sarovar as part of religious rites. In the Sikh religion, there is a place at Golden Temple where the leprosy of Rajni's husband was cured by immersion into the holy sacred pool, and many pilgrims bathe in the sacred pool believing it will cure their illness as well.

== Types of baths ==
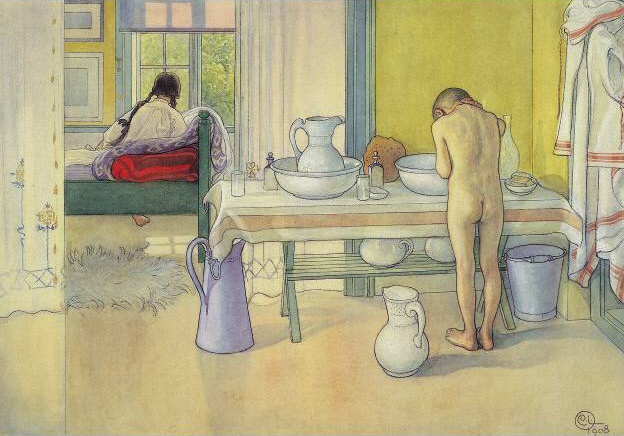
Carl Larsson, Summer Morning, 1908

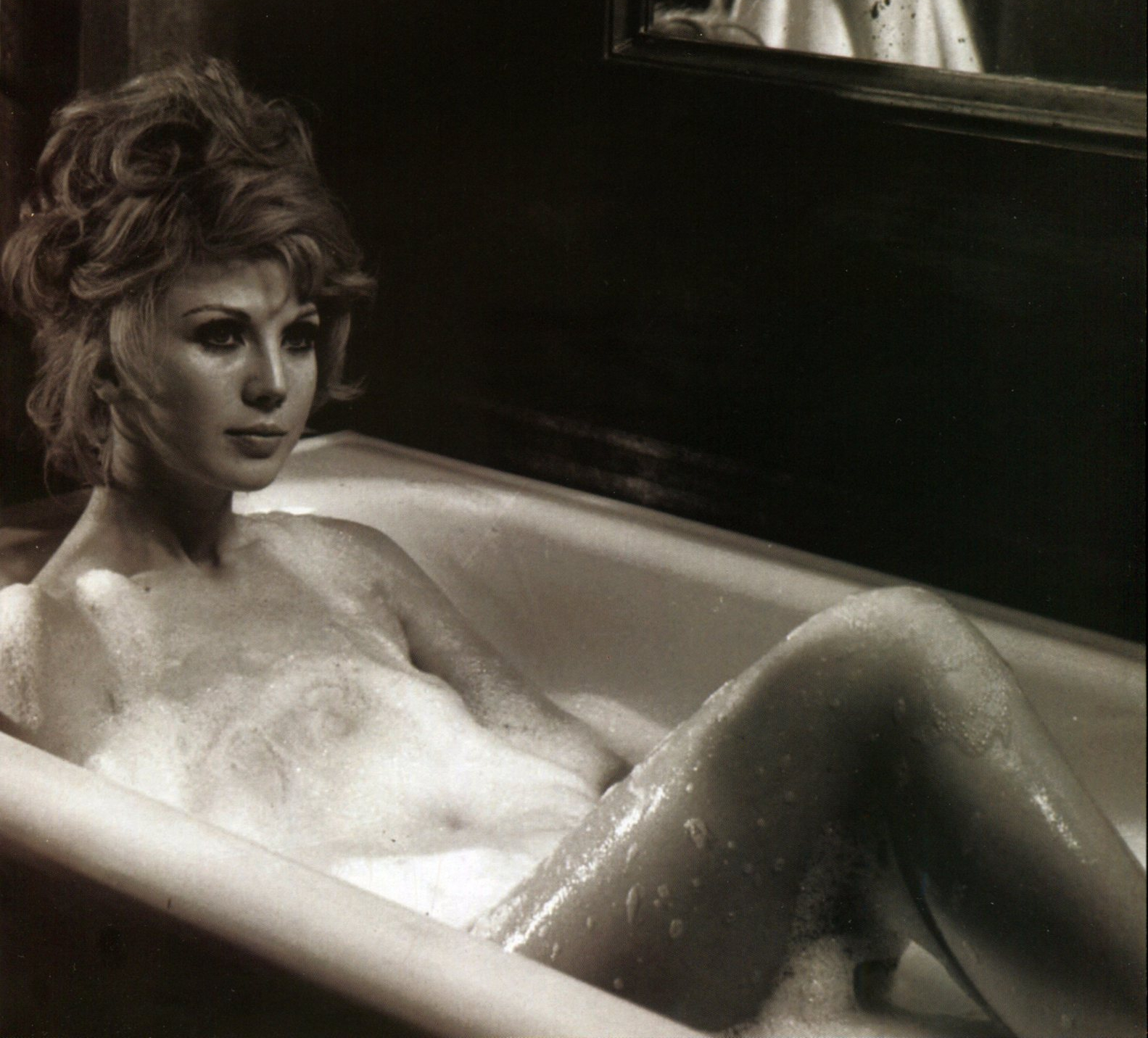
Actress Erna Schürer in a bathtub

Where bathing is for personal hygiene, bathing in a bathtub or shower is the most common form of bathing in Western, and many Eastern, countries. People most commonly bathe in their home or use a private bath in a public bathhouse. In some societies, bathing can take place in rivers, creeks, lakes or water holes, or any other place where there is an adequate pool of water. The quality of water used for bathing purposes varies considerably. Normally bathing involves use of soap or a soap-like substance, such as shower gel. In southern India people more commonly use aromatic oil and other home-made body scrubs.

Bathing in public can also provide occasions for social interaction, such as in Turkish, banya, sauna, hammams, or whirlpool baths.

=== Sponge bath ===
When water is in short supply or a person is not fit to have a standing bath, a wet cloth or sponge can be used, or the person can wash by splashing water over their body. A sponge bath is usually conducted in hospitals, which involves one person washing another with a sponge, while the person being washed remains lying in bed.

=== Ladling water from a container ===
Eadweard Muybridge, 1872–1885 (photographed); 1887 (images published); 2012 (animated), Nude woman washing face, animated from Animal locomotion, Vol. IV, Plate 413

This method involves using a small container to scoop water out of a large container and pour water over the body, in such a way that this water does not go back into the large container.

In Indonesia and Malaysia, this is a traditional method referred to as mandi.

In the Indonesian language, mandi is the verb for this process; bak mandi is the large container, and kamar mandi is the place in which this is done. Travel guides often use the word mandi on its own or in various ways such as for the large container and for the process of bathing.

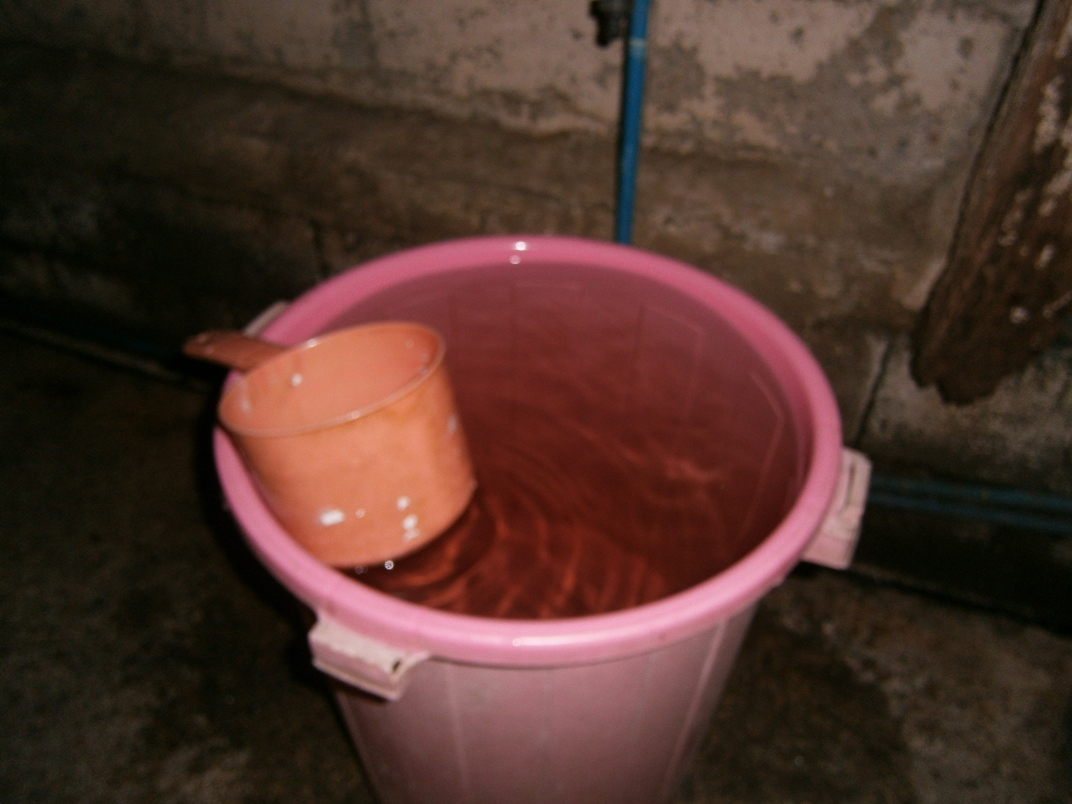
The timba (pail) and the tabo (dipper), the two essentials in Philippine bathrooms and bathing areas.

In the Philippines, timba (pail) and tabo (dipper) are two essentials in every bathroom.

=== Bathing babies ===
Babies can be washed in a kitchen sink or a small plastic baby bath, instead of using a standard bath which offers little control of the infant's movements and requires the parent to lean awkwardly or kneel. The World Health Organisation recommends only sponge baths until the umbilical cord stump falls off. Bathing infants too often has been linked to the development of asthma or severe eczema according to some researchers, including Michael Welch, chair of the American Academy of Pediatrics' section on allergy and immunology. It's advised that until the baby becomes more mobile, they should only be washed about three times a week. A safe temperature for the bathwater is generally held to be 32–38 °C (90–100 °F).

== Japanese bathing culture ==
=== Private baths ===
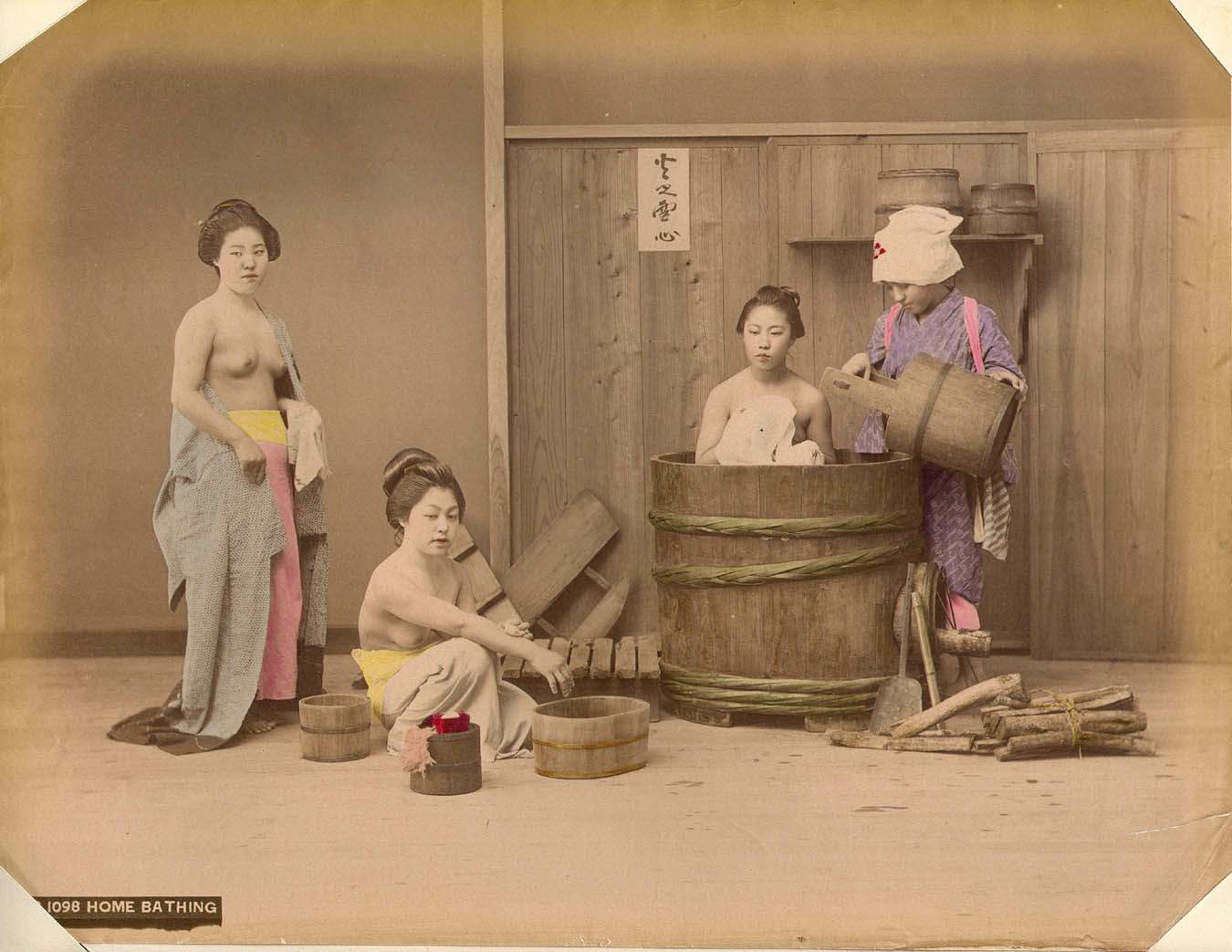
Home bathing (1900s), by Kusakabe Kimbei

Although baths at home had been prevalent to some extent since the Edo period (1603-1867), the common people usually went to public bathhouses during the first half of the Showa period (1926-1989), and only wealthy families had their own bathrooms. Home baths became commonplace since the period of rapid economic growth after World War II. Bath water in Japan is much hotter than what is usual in Central Europe. The temperature is usually well above 40 °C (104 °F). In medical literature, 47 °C (117 °F) is considered bearable. The heat is considered a prerequisite for complete relaxation. The custom is to thoroughly clean oneself with soap and rinse before entering the tub, so as not to contaminate the bath water.

=== Public baths ===
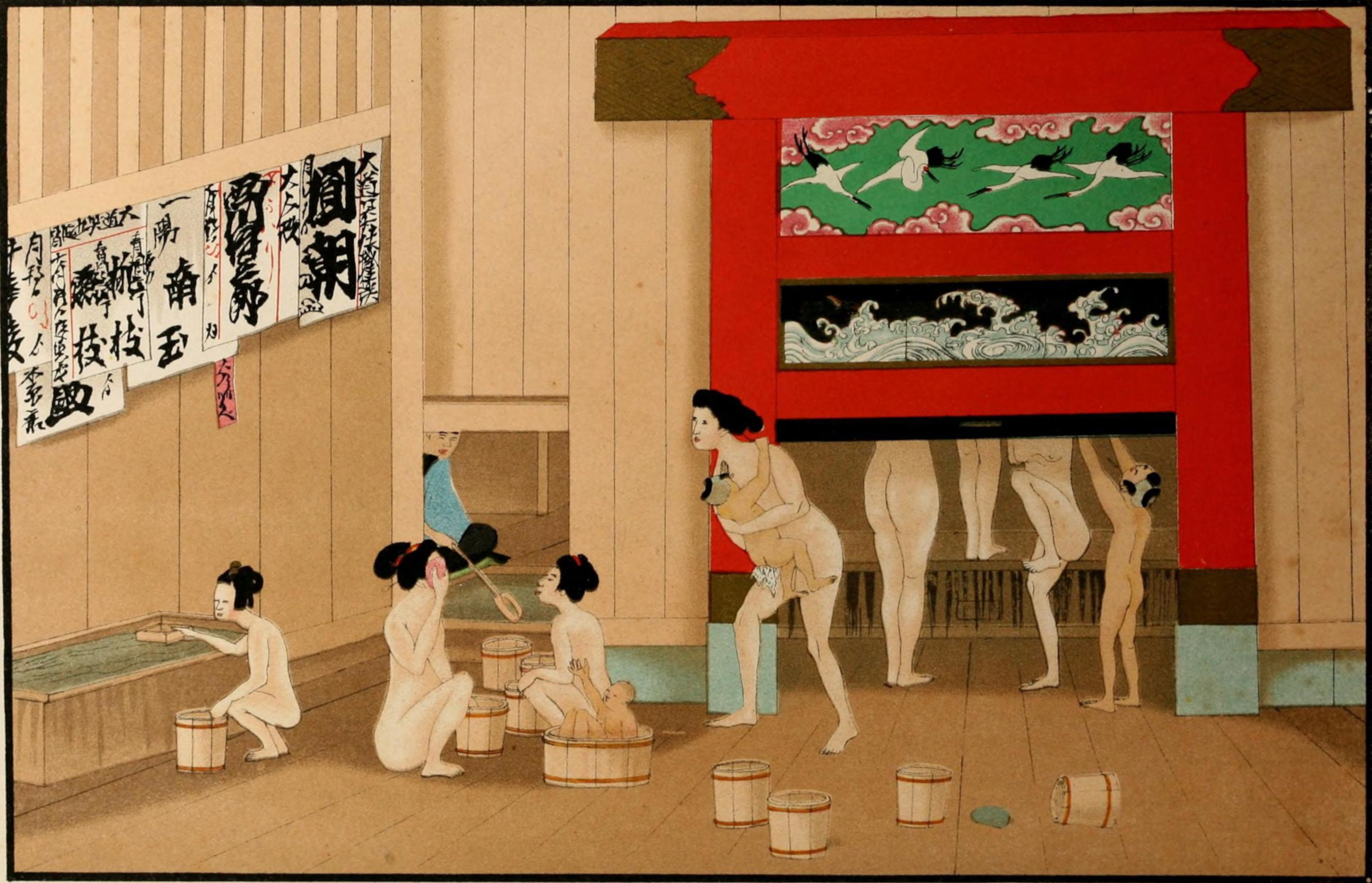
Sento bathing scene. Japanese woman bathing in a wooden tub (woodcut by Torii Kiyomitsu, late 18th century)

In public baths, there is a distinction between public baths with natural hot springs (called onsen, meaning 'hot'), and those without natural hot springs (known as sento). Since Japan is located in a volcanically active region, there are many hot springs, of which about 2,000 are swimming pools. Most onsen are in the open countryside, but they are also found in cities. In Tokyo, for example, there are about 25 onsen baths. Onsen are similar to Western-style spas in their therapeutic use of natural hot springs.

An onsen consists mostly of outdoor pools (rotenburo), which are sometimes at different temperatures. Extremely hot springs, where even experienced or frequent hot-spring bathers can only stay a few minutes, are called jigoku ('hell'). Many onsen also have saunas, spa treatments and therapy centers. The same rules apply in public baths as in private baths, with bathers required to wash and clean themselves before entering the water. In general, the Japanese bathe naked in bathhouses; bathing suits are not permissible.

== Art motif ==
Bathing scenes were already in the Middle Ages a popular subject of painters. Most of the subjects were women shown nude, but the interest was probably less to the bathing itself rather than to provide the context for representing the nude figure. From the Middle Ages, illustrated books of the time contained such bathing scenes. Biblical and mythological themes which featured bathing were depicted by numerous painters. Especially popular themes included Bathsheba in the bath, in which she is observed by King David, and Susanna in the sight of lecherous old men.

In the High Middle Ages, public baths were a popular subject of painting, with rather clear depictions of sexual advances, which probably were not based on actual observations. During the Renaissance and Baroque periods, the gods and nymphs of Greek mythology were depicted bathing in allegorical paintings by artists such as Titian and François Boucher, both of whom painted the goddess Diana bathing. Artists continued to paint Biblical characters bathing, and also sometimes depicted contemporary women bathing in the river, an example being Rembrandt's Woman Bathing.

In the 19th century, the use of the bathing scene reached its high point in classicism, realism and impressionism. Oriental themes and harem and turkish baths scenes became popular. These scenes were based on the artists' imagination, because access by men to Islamic women was not generally permitted. In the second half of the century, artists increasingly eschewed the pretexts of mythology and exoticism, and painted contemporary western women bathing. Edgar Degas, for example, painted over 100 paintings with a bathing theme. The subject of Bathers remained popular in avant-garde circles at the outset of the 20th century.

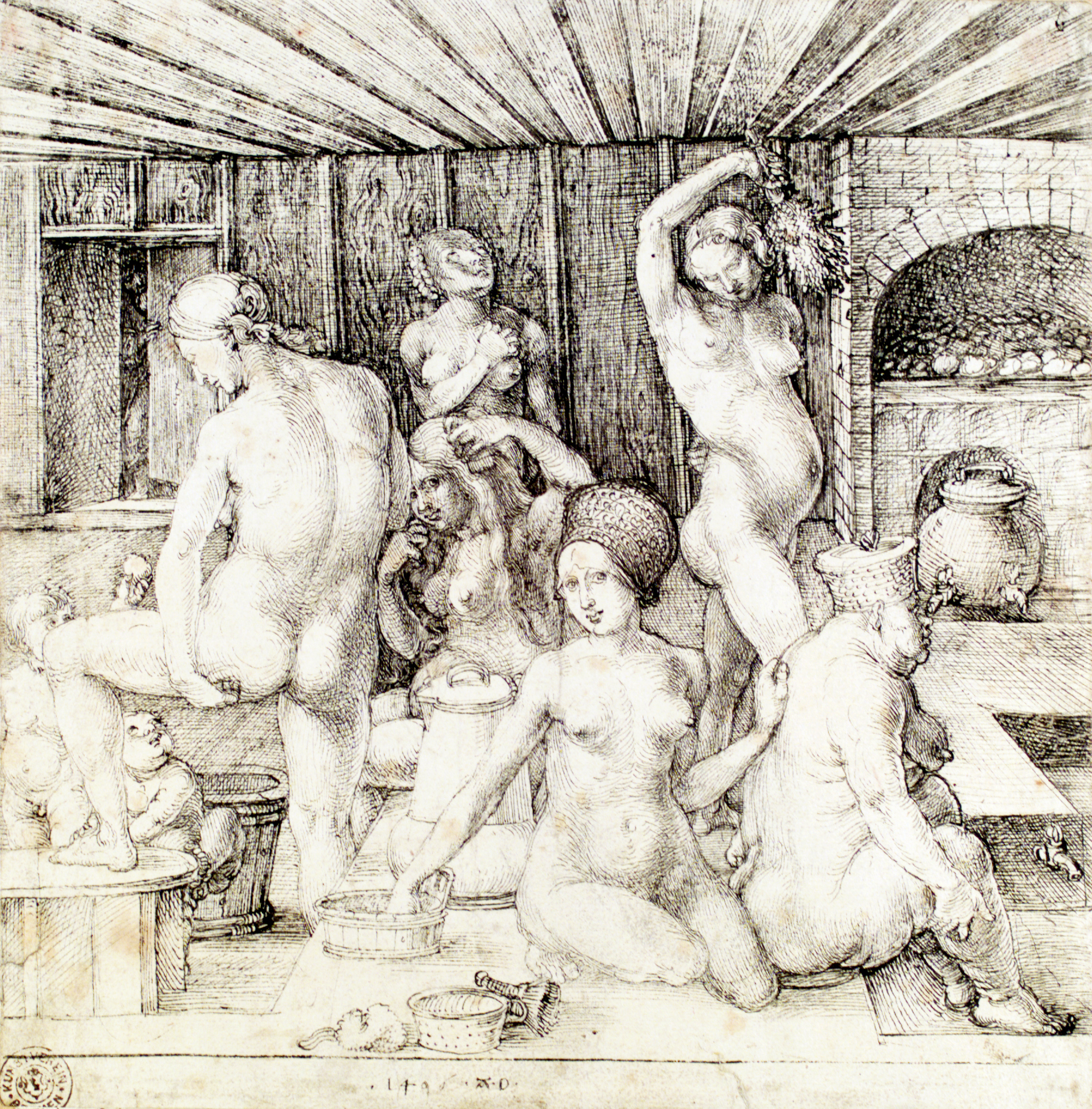
Albrecht Dürer, Women bathing, 1496

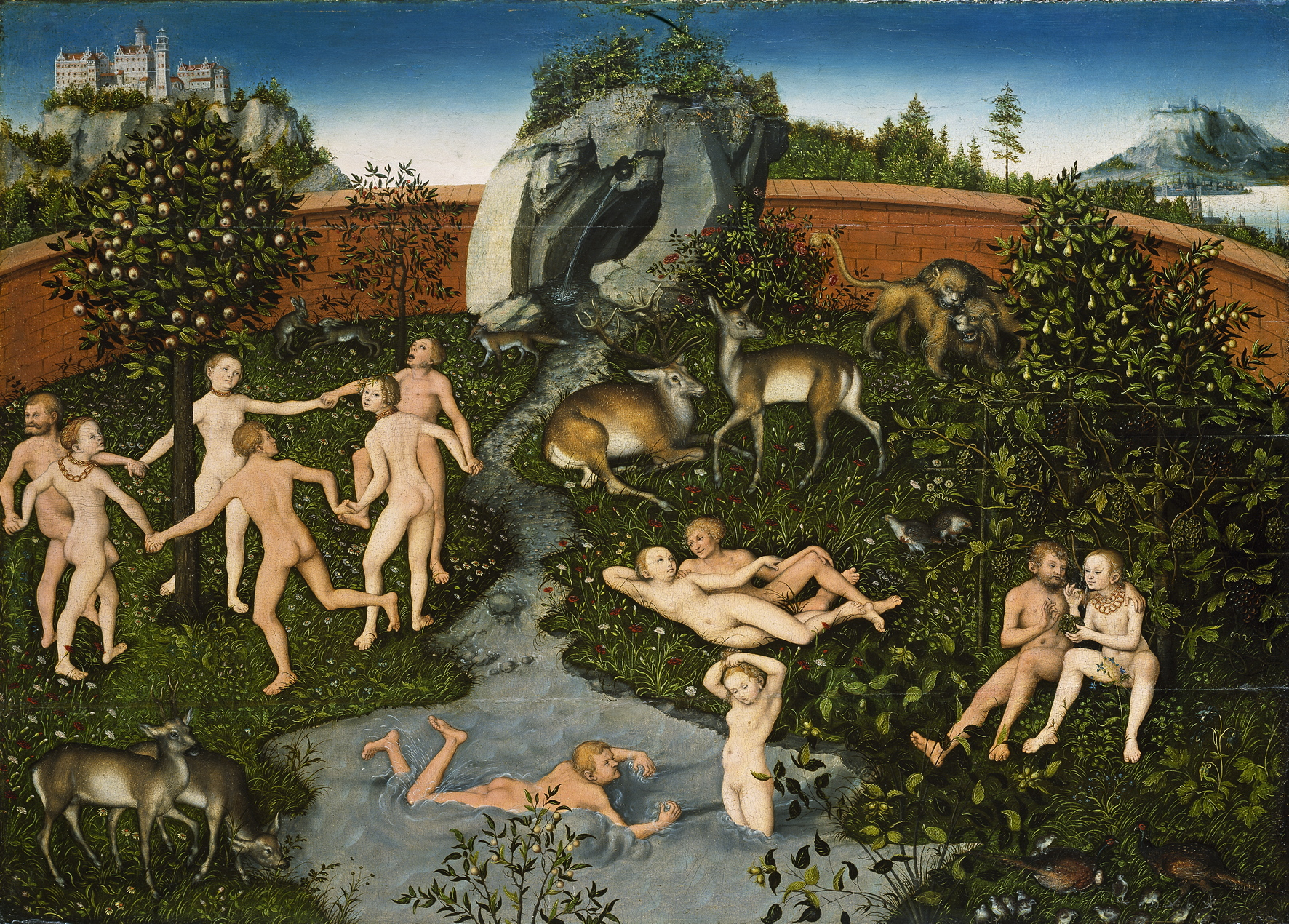
Lucas Cranach, The Golden Age, 1530

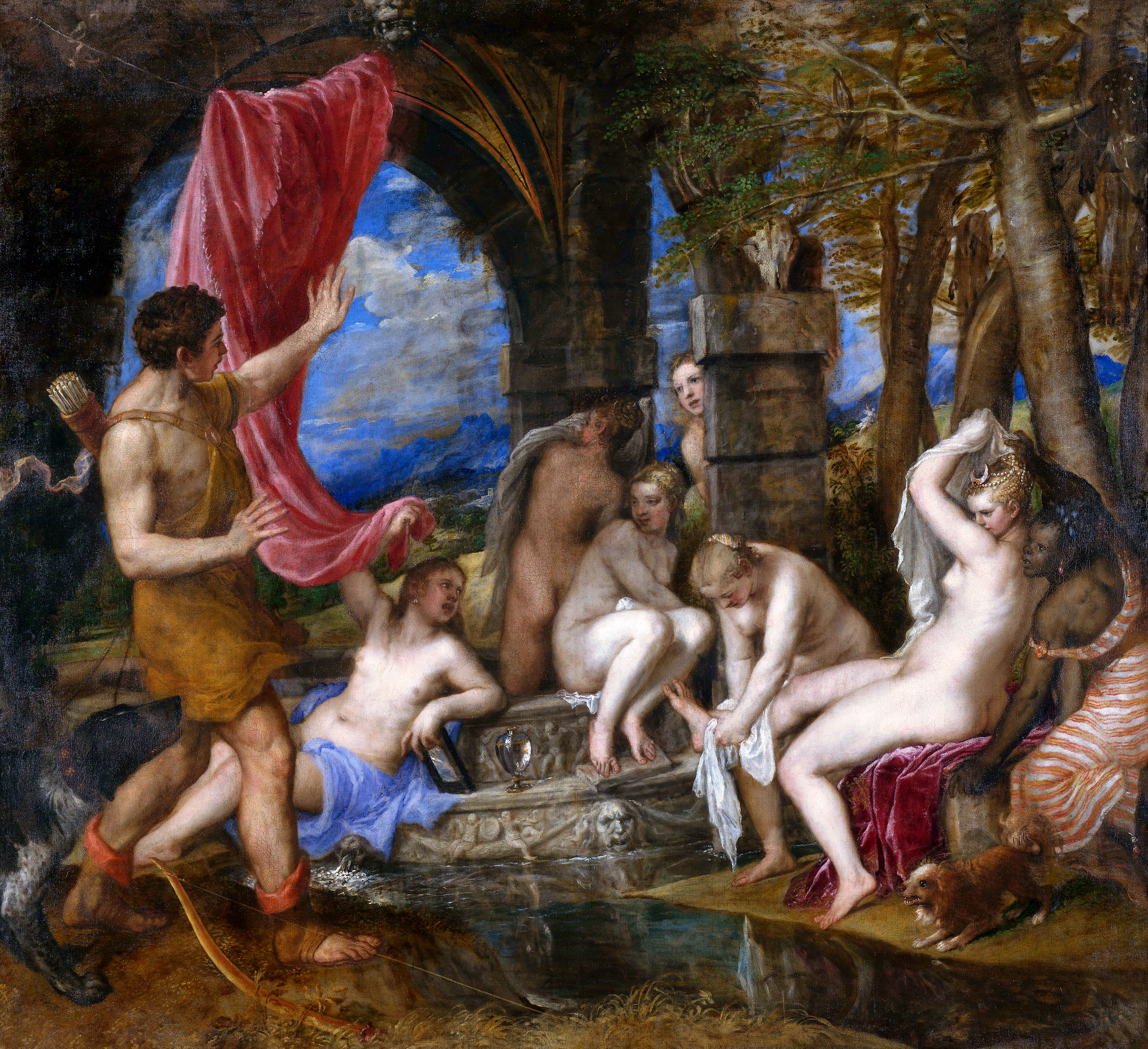
Titian, Actaeon Surprises Diana in Her Bath, 1559

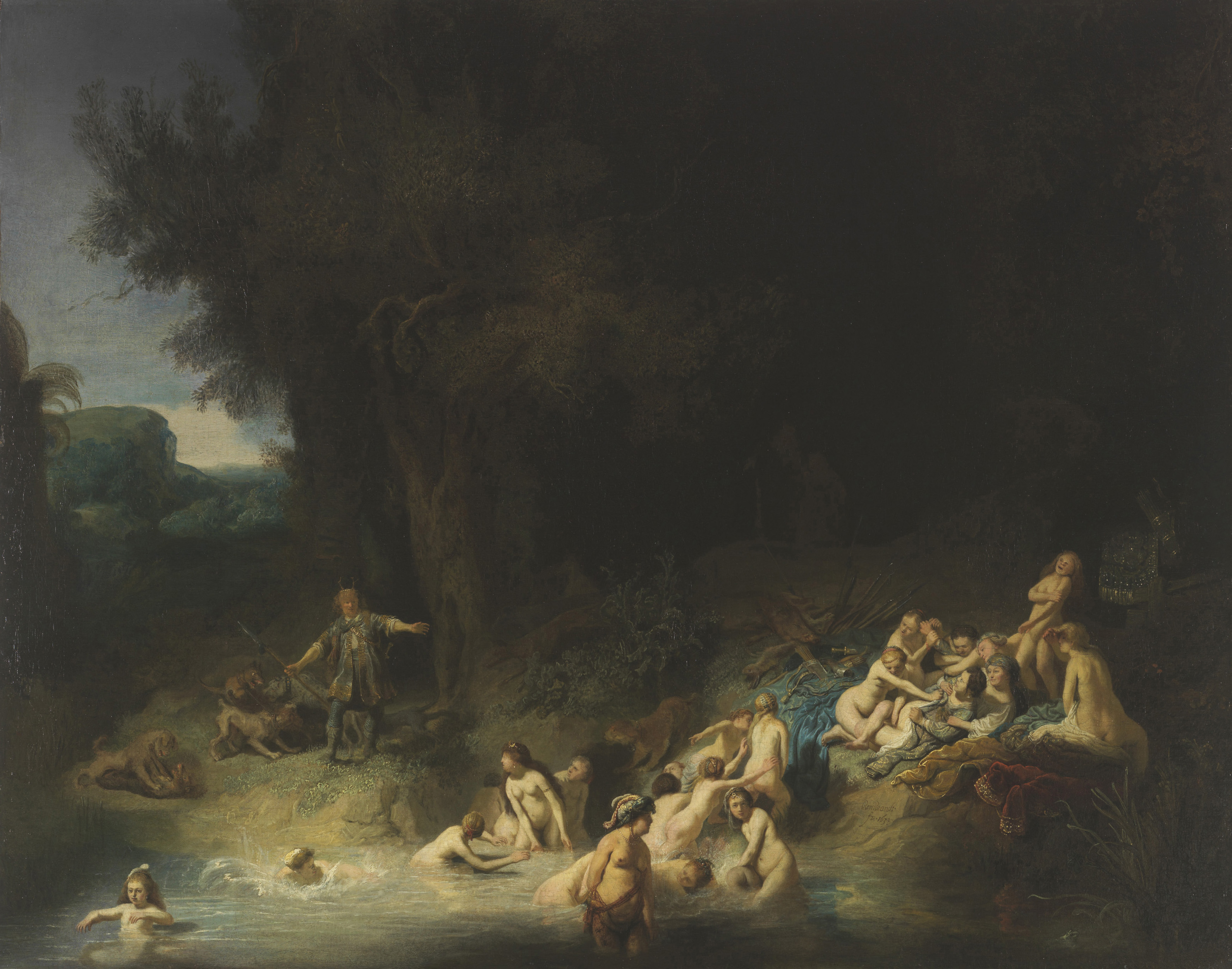
Rembrandt van Rijn, Diana with Actaeon and Callisto, 1634/1635

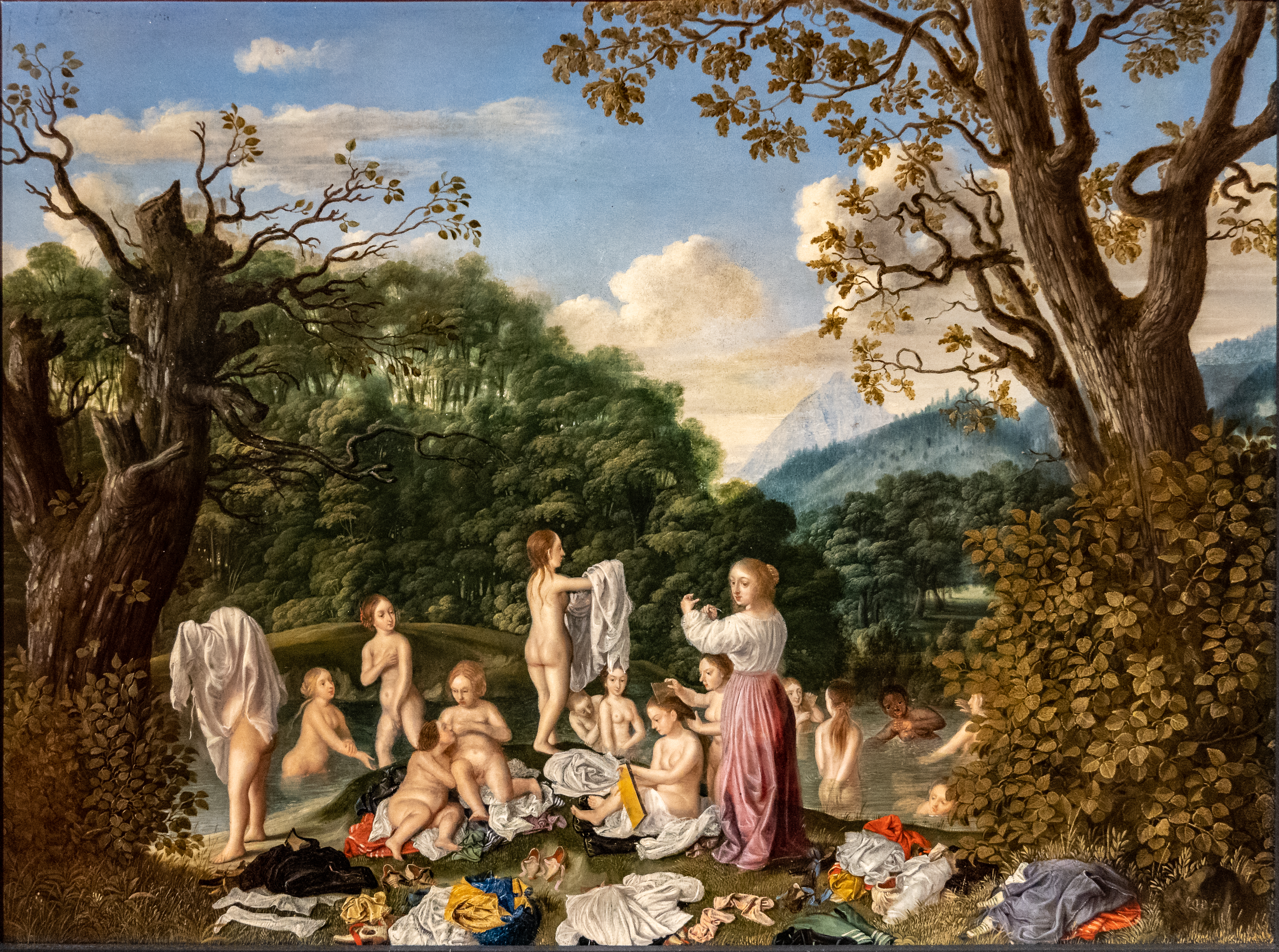
Wolfgang Heimbach, People Bathing, 1640

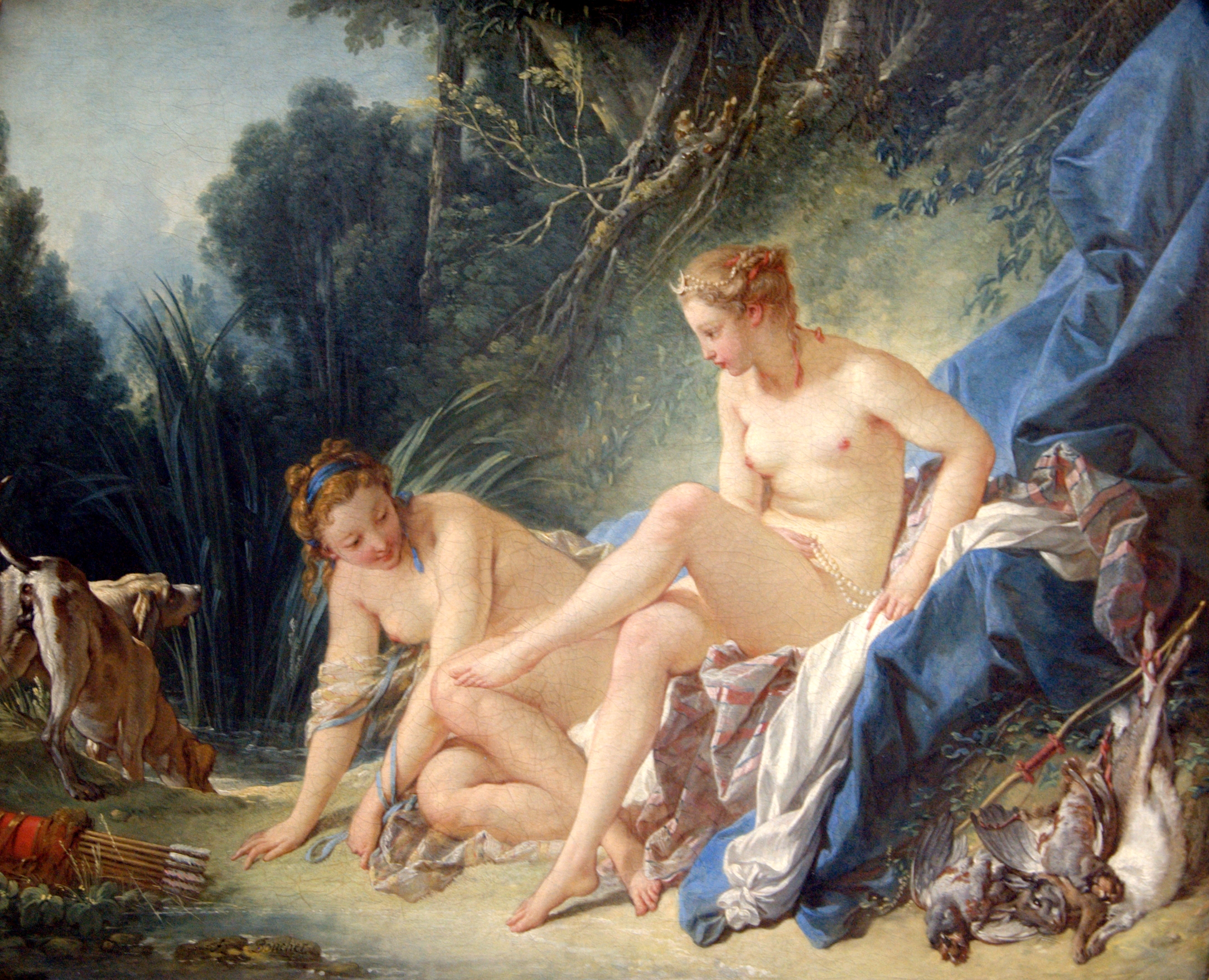
François Boucher, Diana Leaving Her Bath, 1742

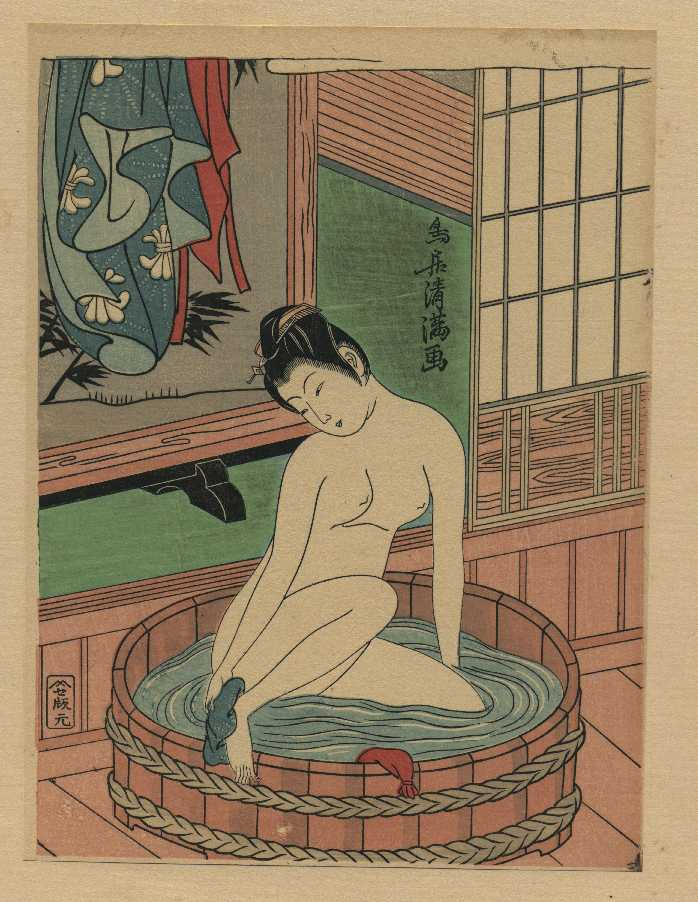
Torii Kiyomitsu, Bathing Woman, 1750

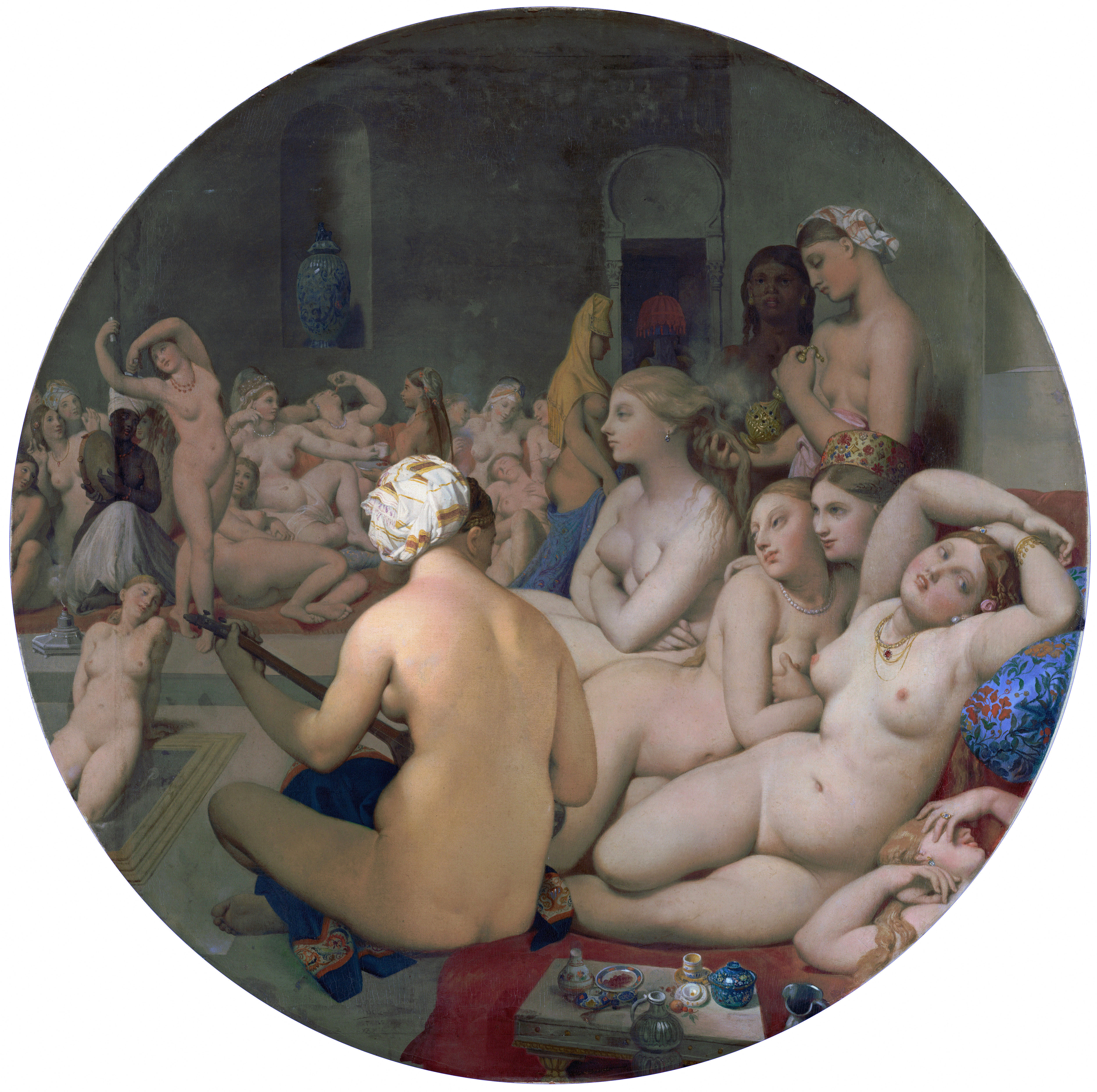
Jean Auguste Dominique Ingres, The Turkish Bath, 1862

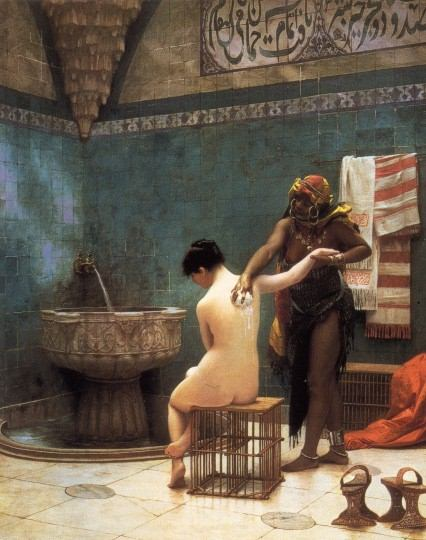
Jean-Léon Gérôme, The Bath, ca. 1880

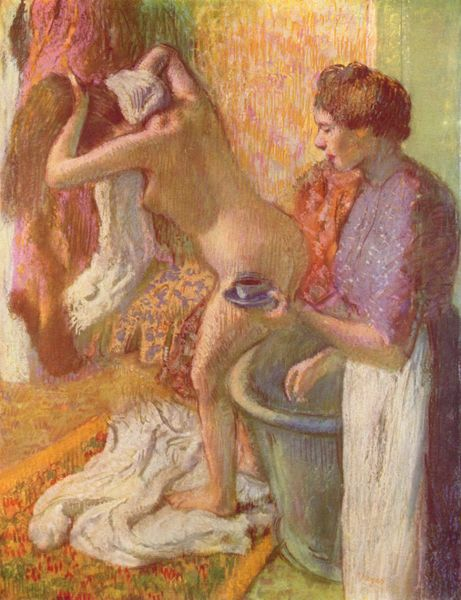
Edgar Degas, After the Bath, ca. 1890

Paul Gauguin, By the Sea, 1892

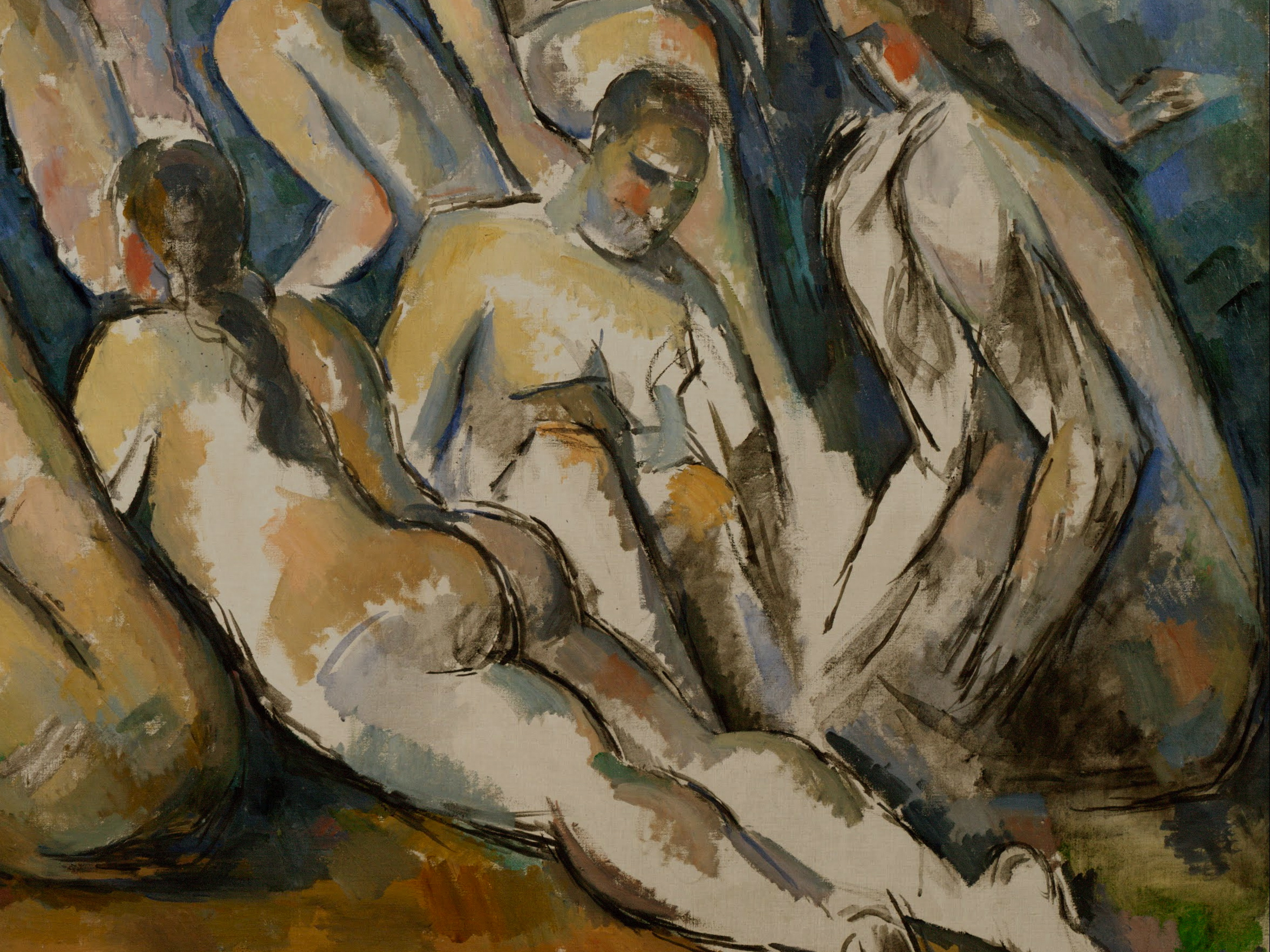
Paul Cézanne, The Large Bathers (detail)

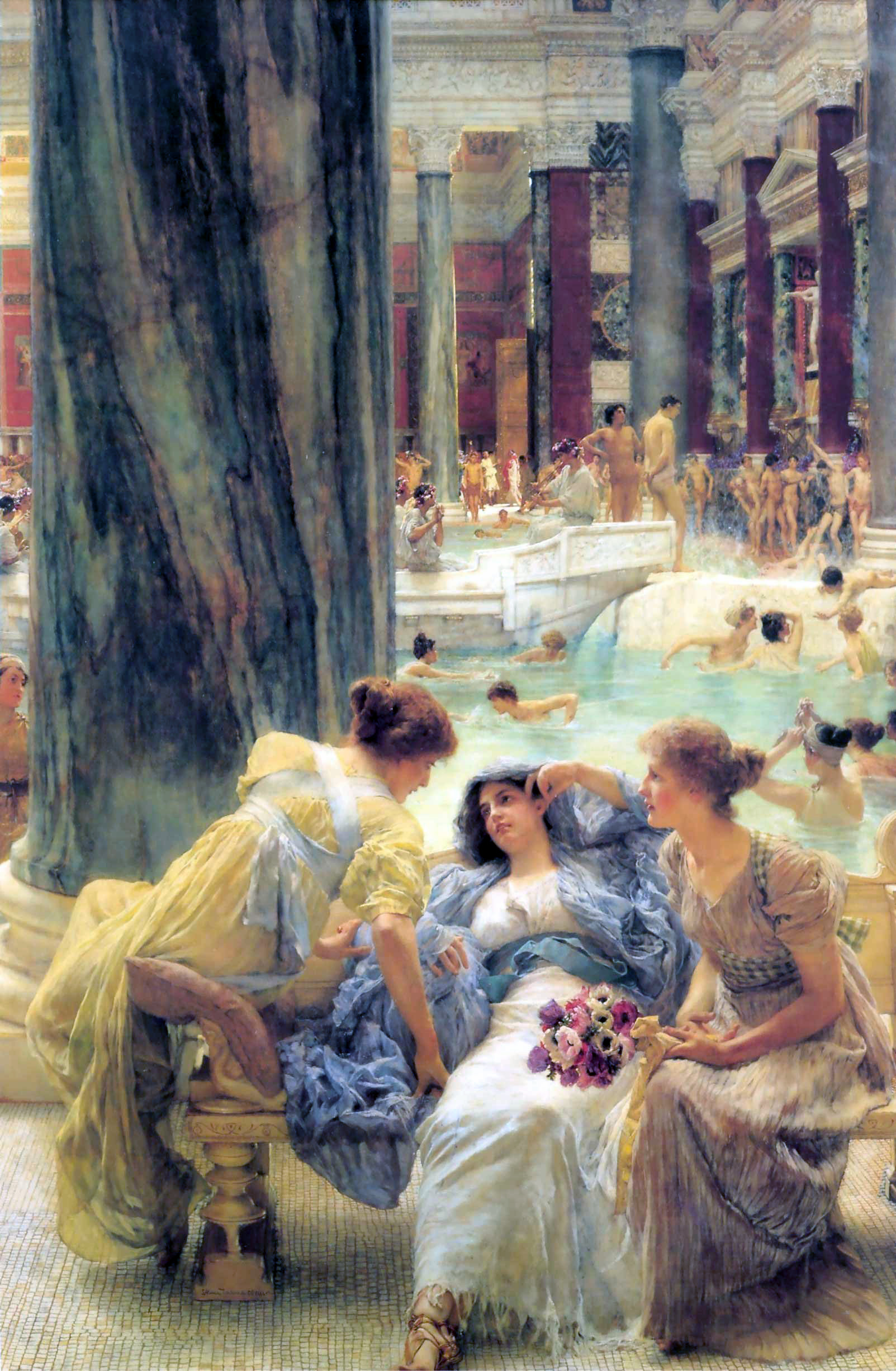
Lawrence Alma-Tadema, The Baths at Caracalla, 1899

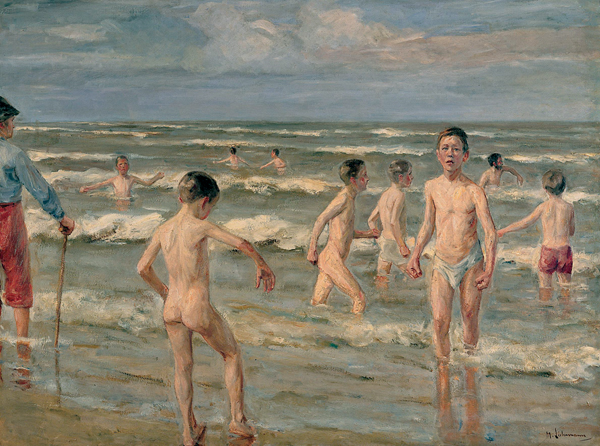
Max Liebermann, Bathing Boys, 1900

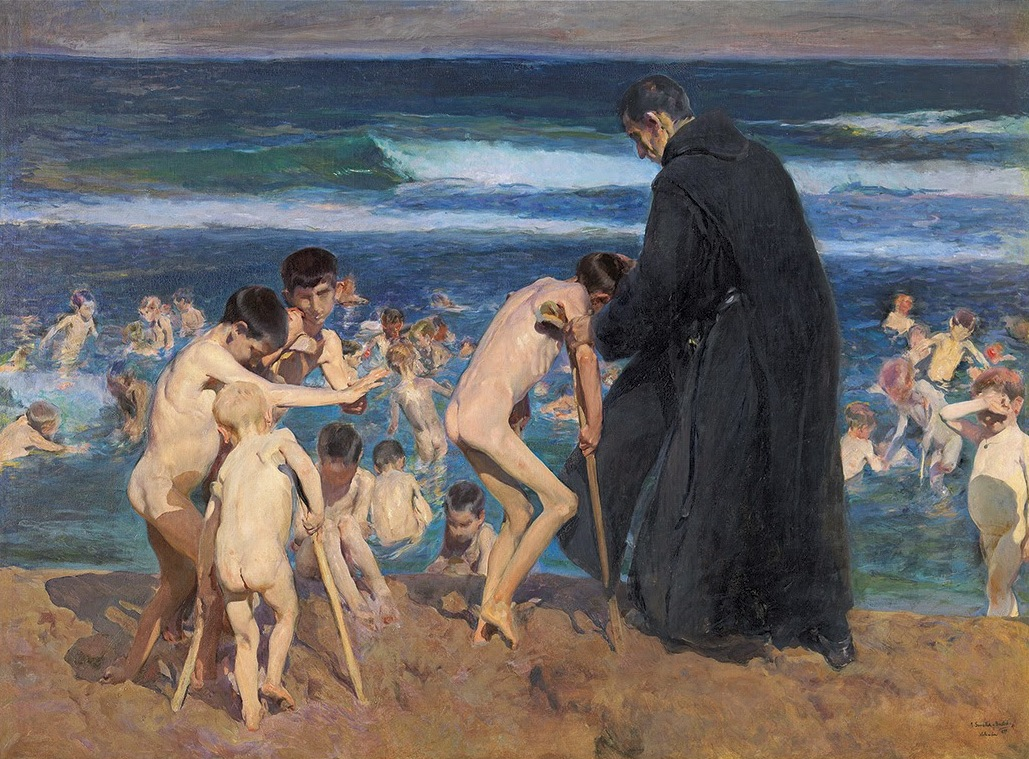
Joaquín Sorolla y Bastida, Sad Inheritance, 1900. Crippled children bathing at the sea in Valencia

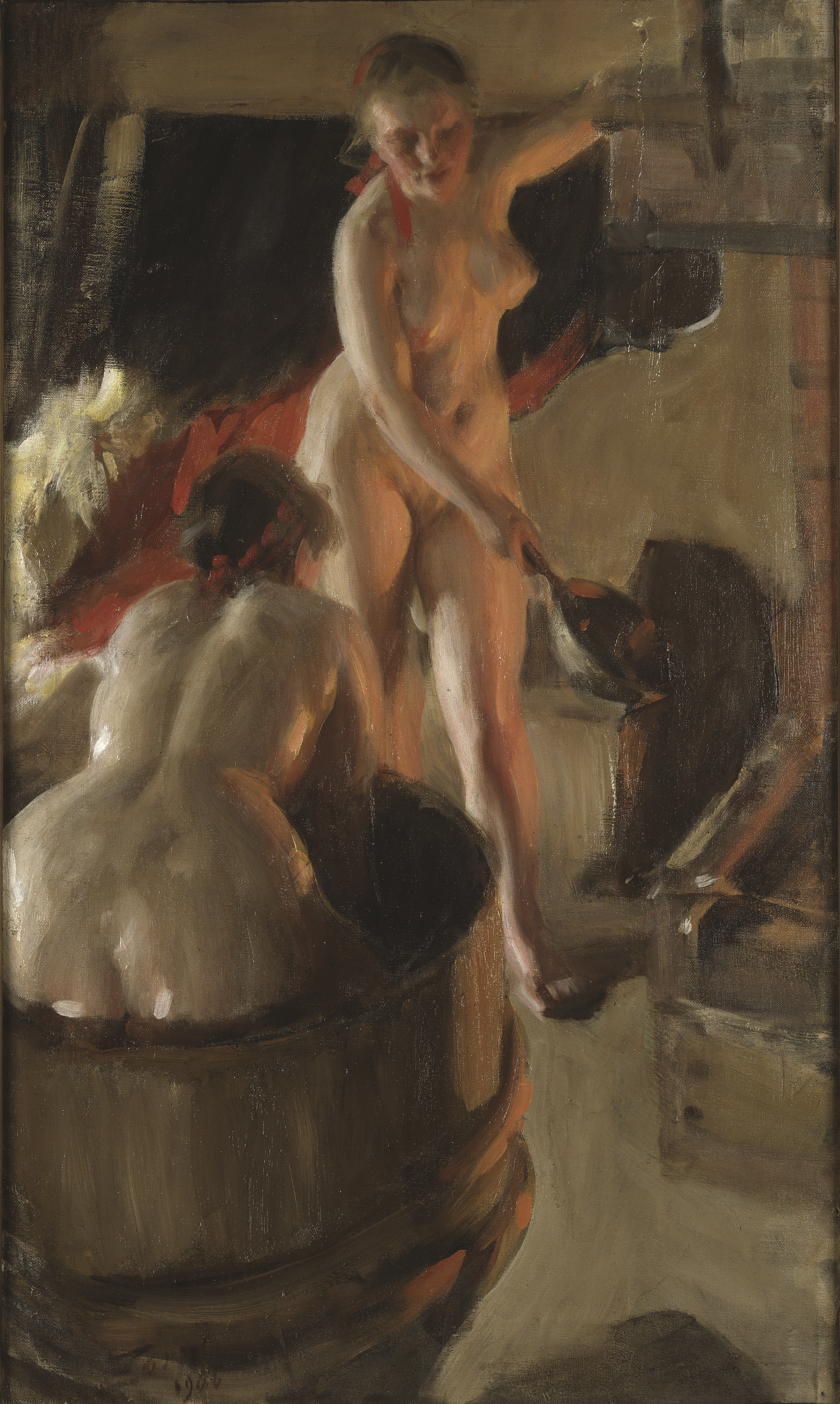
Anders Zorn, Girls from Dalarna Having a Bath, 1906

Jean Metzinger, Baigneuse, Deux nus dans un jardin exotique (Two Nudes in an Exotic Landscape), 1905–06

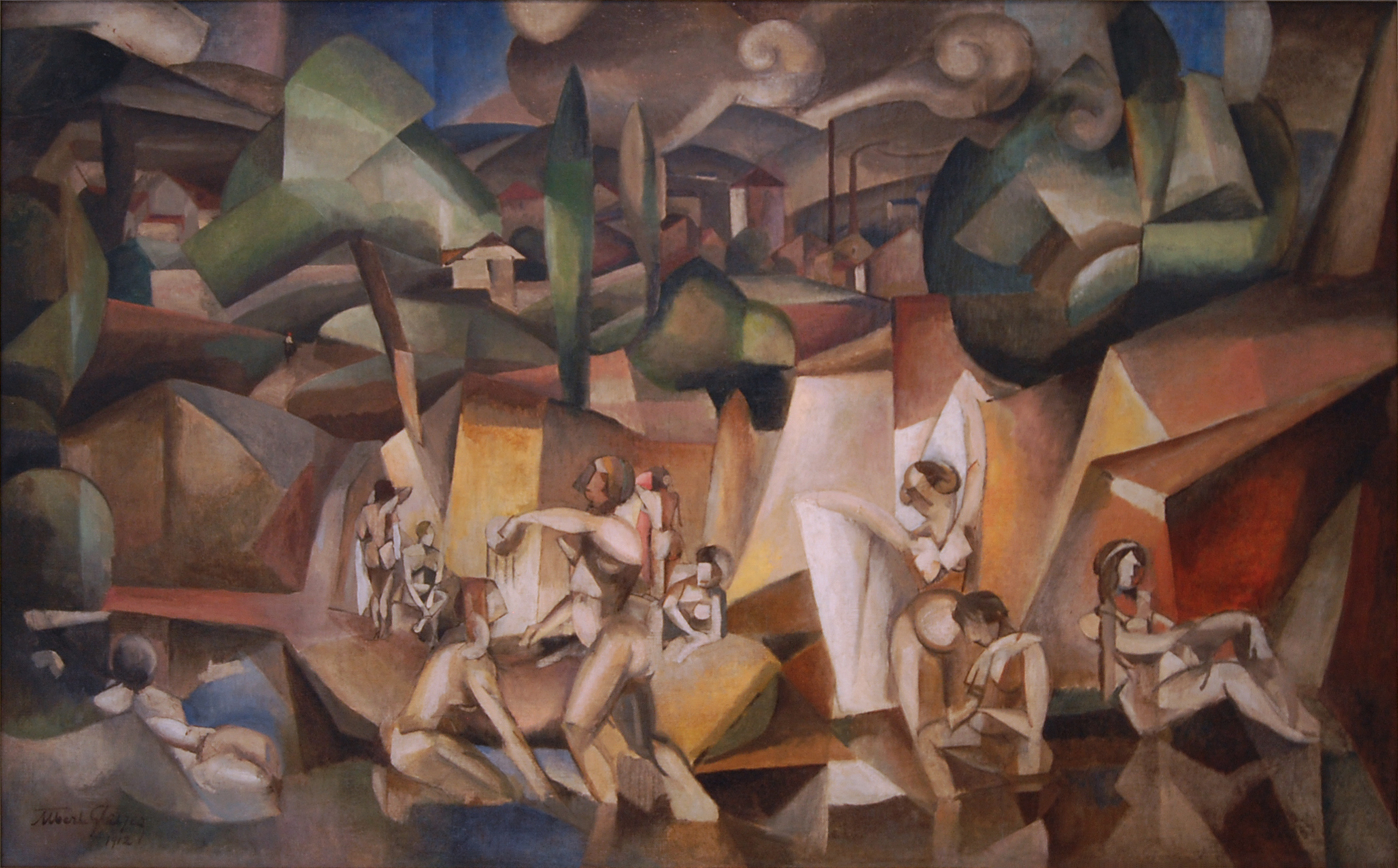
Albert Gleizes, Les Baigneuses (The Bathers), 1912, Musée d'Art Moderne de la Ville de Paris

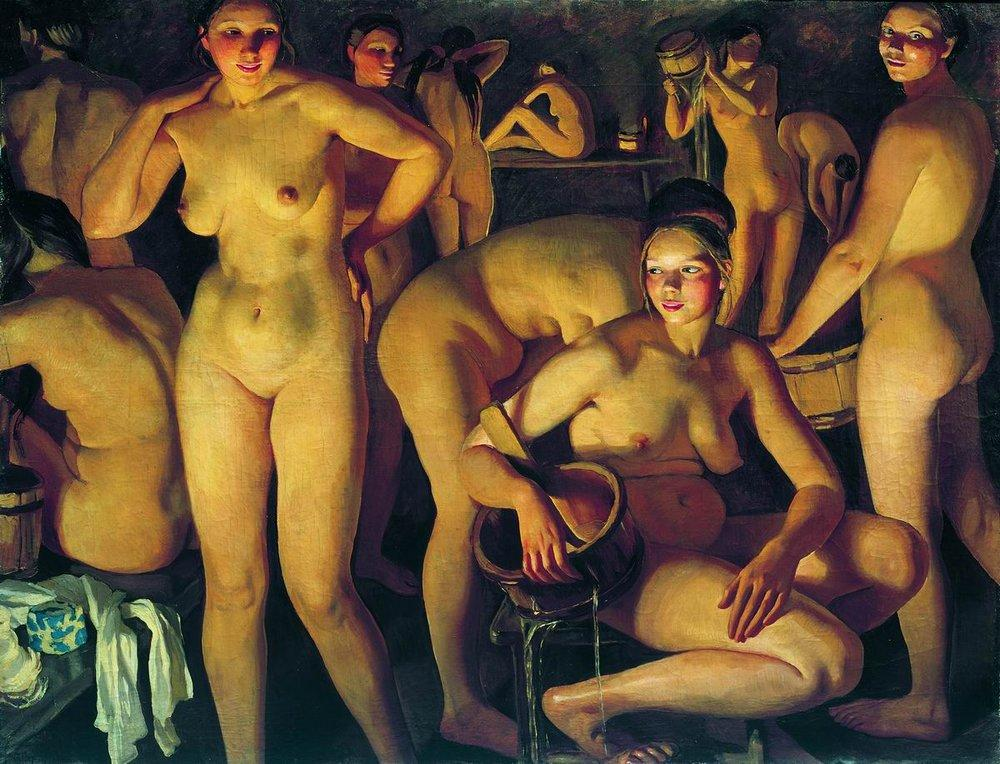
Zinaida Serebriakova, Banya, 1913

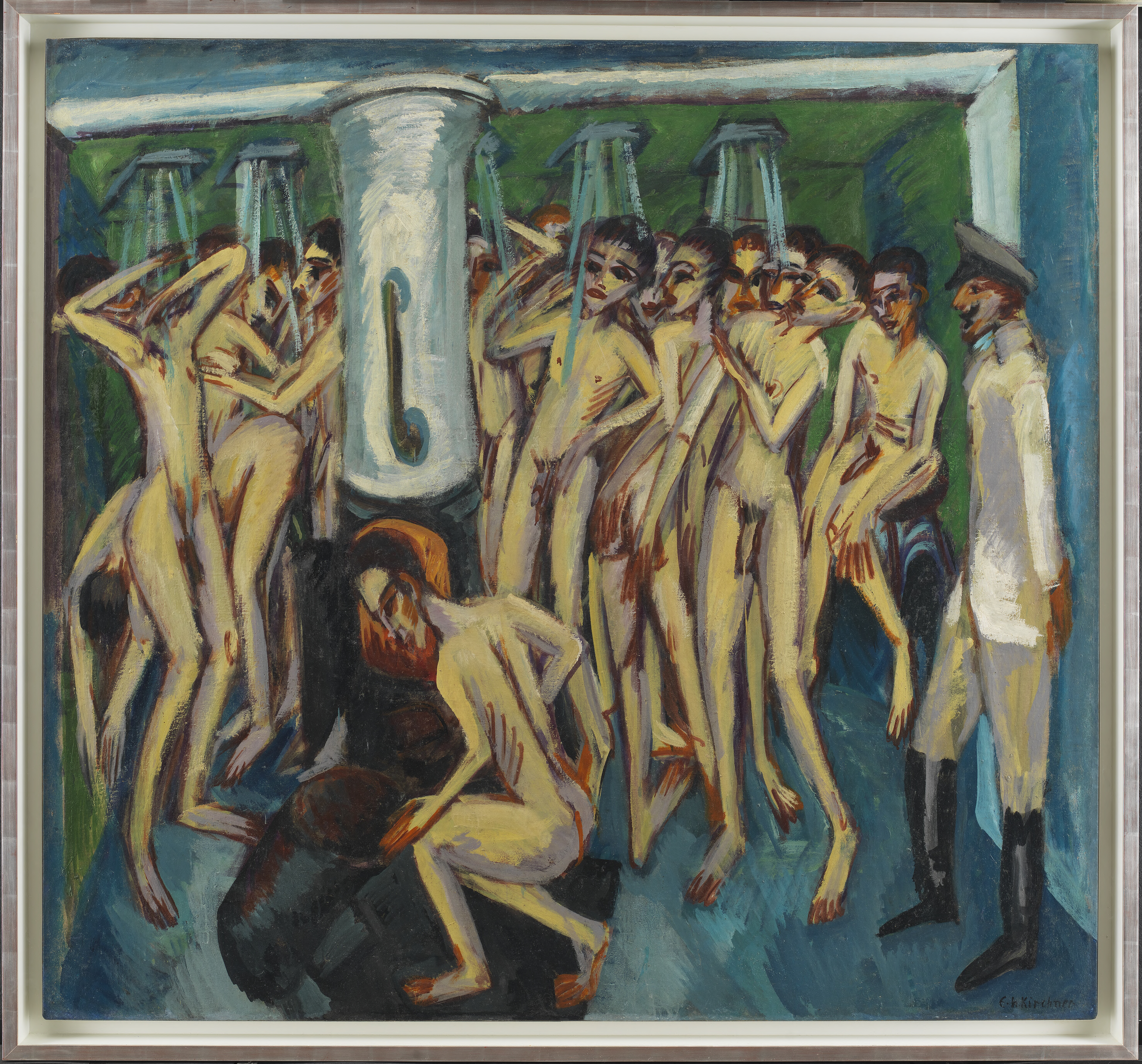
Ernst Ludwig Kirchner, The Soldier Bath, 1915

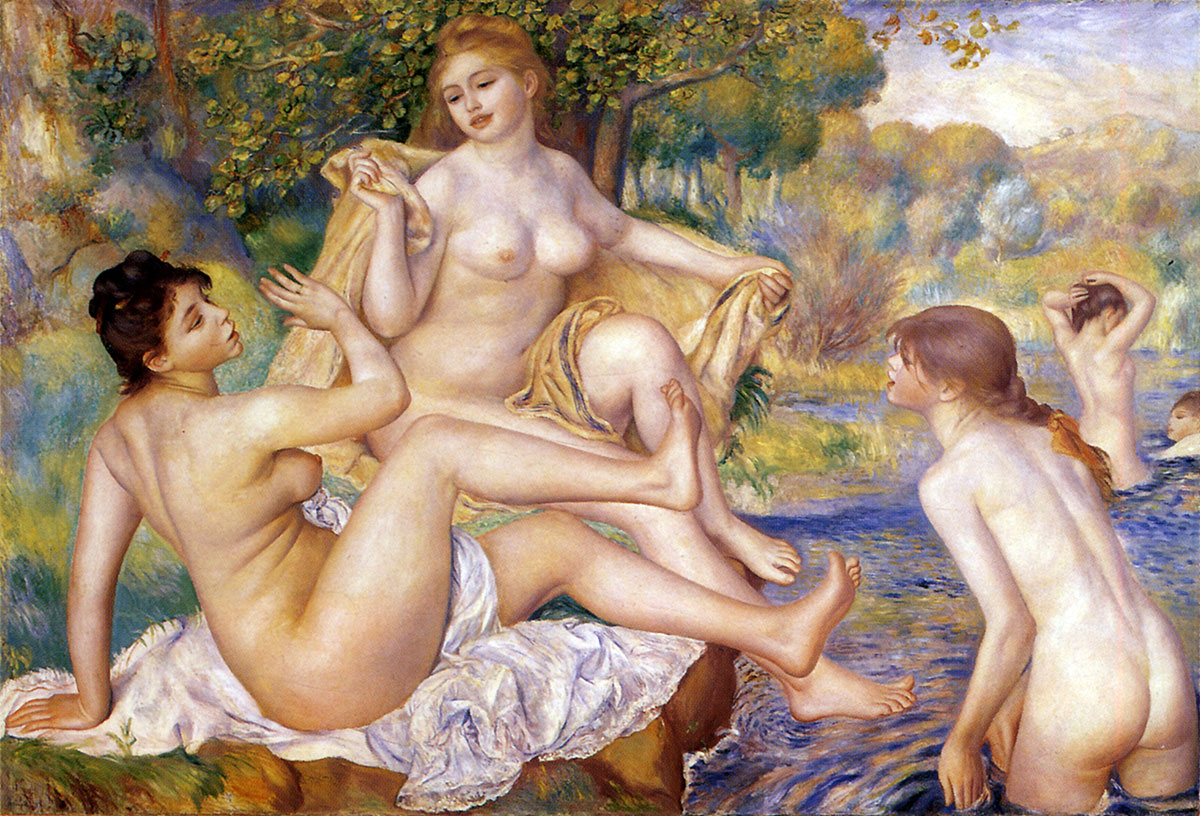
Pierre-Auguste Renoir, The bathing women, 1919

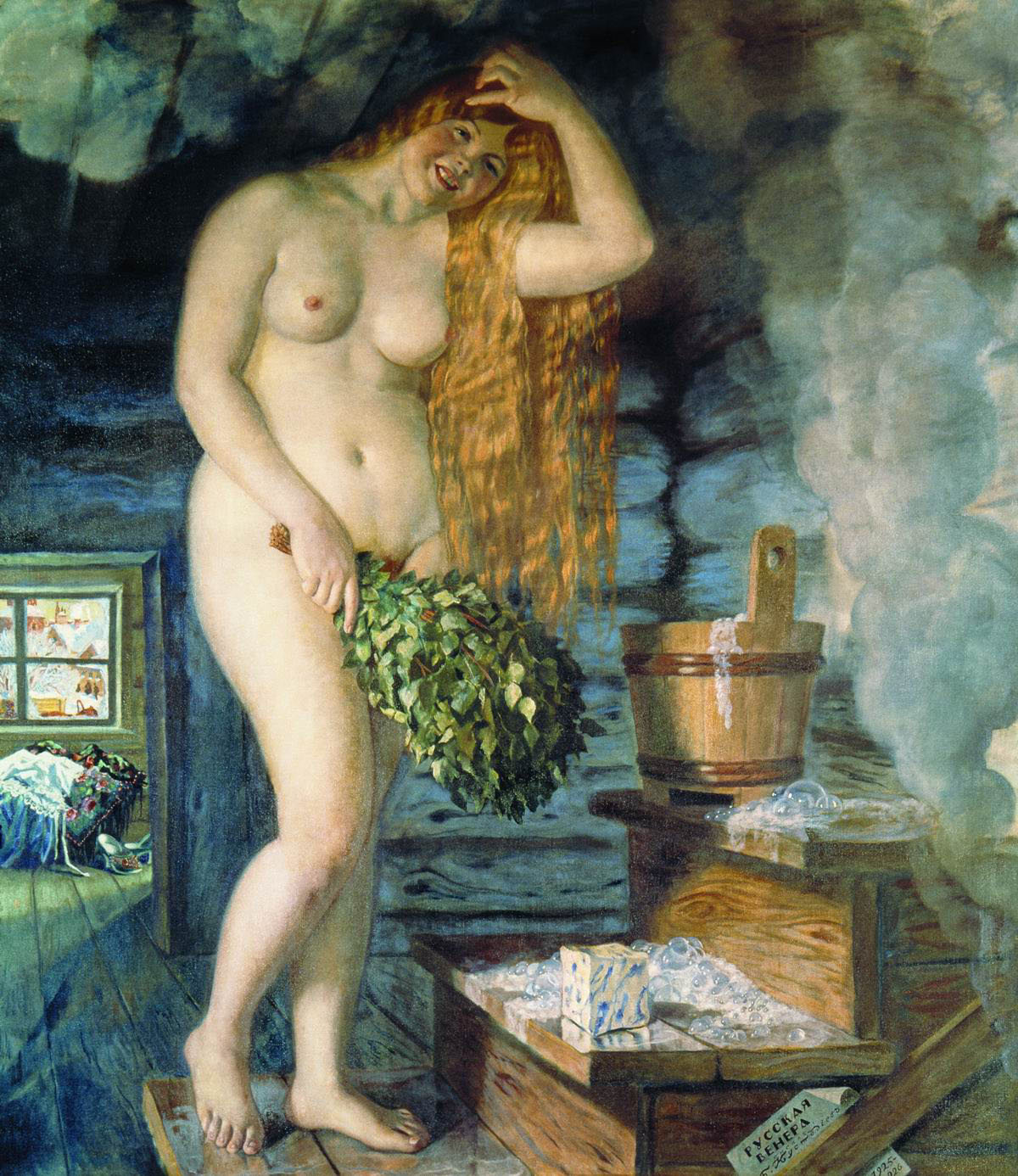
Boris Kustodiev, Russian Venus, 1926

Pablo Picasso, Quatre baigneuses (Four Bathers), 1922, Collection Paul Allen

In the German spa town Bad Liebenzell the bather is part of the municipal Coat of arms

== See also ==
- Accessible bathtub
- Balneotherapy
- Destination spa
- Navy shower
- Spas
- Thermae
- Don't throw the baby out with the bathwater
- List of cleaning tools
