= Electronic bidet =

Nozzle attached to an existing toilet, or a part of the toilet itself

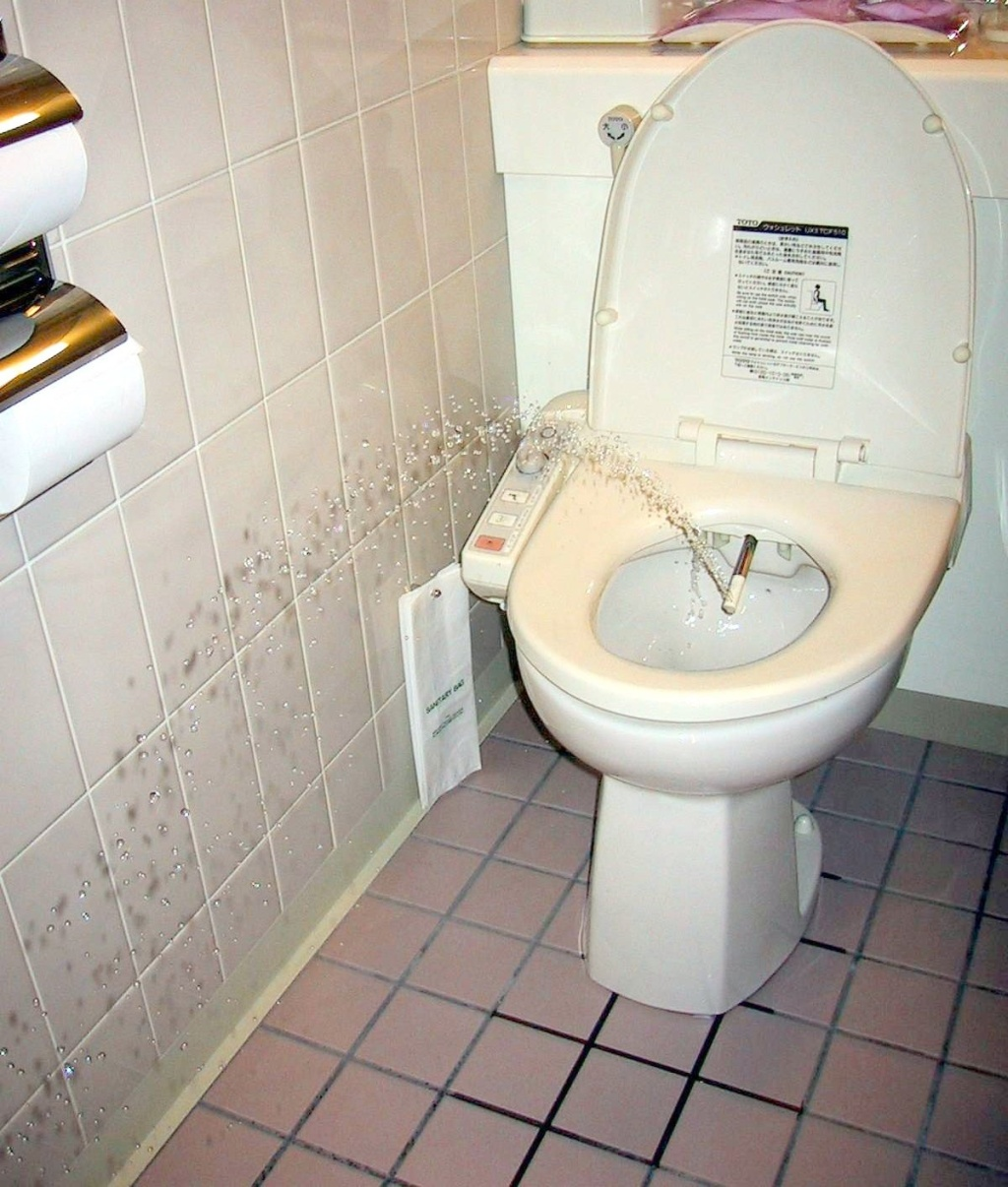
Bidet-style toilet in Japan

An electronic bidet is a seat attached to an existing toilet or a part of the toilet itself, with a nozzle to squirt a jet of warm water for cleaning the anus and female genitals, electrically powered and with electronic controls. It replaces the conventional bidet, a separate plumbing fixture not attached to a toilet. Some bidets of this type have one adjustable nozzle on the side rim for anus and genital areas, or two nozzles on the back rim, a shorter one for washing the area around the anus, and a longer one for women to wash their vulva.

== Features ==
The essential feature is the nozzle that comes out from underneath the toilet seat and squirts water. It typically has two settings: rear cleaning to wash the anus, and feminine cleaning to wash the vulva, which can be particularly useful during menstruation.

Basic non-electronic

- A non-electronic toilet-top bidet is a seat for or an attachment to a toilet, with a spray nozzle. The position can usually be adjusted. Most use a single water feed, at the supply temperature (cold or warm); some have hot and cold feed, and a control for adjusting the temperature.

Electronic, basic functionality

- A toilet seat connected to a cold water supply and to electricity, with an adjustable nozzle. The device warms the water. The nozzle is typically self-cleaning before and after operation.
- The seat is usually heated, reflecting conditions in Japan where electronic bidets are very popular: many homes do not have central heating, and get very cold in winter.
- Most electronic bidets blow warm air for drying.
- Some form of control panel attached to the side.

Advanced features not provided by all bidets

- Most electronic bidets support adjustable water, air and seat temperature, adjustable water pressure, and adjustable nozzle position or direction.
- Built-in deodorizers and activated carbon filters.
- An "oscillating mode" in which the nozzle moves back and forth, and a "pulsating mode" which varies jet intensity to help stimulate bowel movement.
- Programs such as alternating pulsed hot and cold, prolonged warm action (described sometimes as "sitz bath").
- Remote control (either wired or wireless).
- Energy-saving mode which activates seat heating only if a user sits on the seat.
- Automatic opening and closing of the top lid if a user approaches facing backwards, and both lids if facing forwards.
- Illumination if a user approaches.
- Music (MP3 player).
- Disinfection of nozzles with ultraviolet light or treated water.

== History ==
=== 1950s: Invention ===
In the early 1950s, a Swiss engineer Hans Maurer developed the first loo with a warm water jet and a warm-air hairdryer for intimate areas. In 1956 he filed for a Swiss patent and brought the toilet to the market as "Closomat" (from "Closet" and "Automatic"). The first generation had a large number of teething problems and was not very successful. In 1961 he introduced the second generation and sold 10 000 units within the next 15 years.

=== 1960s: Early years ===
In the early 1960s, the father of Arnold Cohen of Brooklyn, New York, US had a medical condition that caused pain in the rectal area. Arnold designed a toilet seat bidet system, which featured a nozzle that sprayed warm water and blew hot air. In 1964, Arnold patented his design, founded the American Bidet Company, and started marketing the innovative bidet product, dubbed "American Sitzbath", by using large ads and attending trade shows. It was intended for use at hospitals by patients who had difficulty using toilet paper or reaching around to wipe themselves. Arnold installed thousands of these seats in the suburbs of New York, and the company had offices across the country. Due to cultural barriers, advertising was almost impossible; few wanted to run the ads that the company produced.

Following the failure of the product in North America, Cohen licensed his invention and patent to the TOTO company in Japan. In 1967, TOTO imported Arnold's bidet system, now rebranded as 'Wash Air Seat' in Japan. The bidet system failed in Japan as well, because it was too expensive and the bidet function was too foreign for Japanese consumers.

In Japan, the INAX Sanitarina 61 (1967) was the first commercial bidet toilet with warm water spray and drying functions. The INAX Sanitarina F1 (1976) bidet toilet introduced a heated toilet seat.

=== 1980s: Introduction of the Washlet ===
Between 1978 and 1980, TOTO developed the first Washlet. In 1980, TOTO introduced the Washlet G, which debuted with three functions: rear cleansing, dryer, and a heated seat. In 1982, the first Washlet television commercial aired, featuring the singer Jun Togawa telling viewers that 'even though it's a bottom, it wants to be washed too'. In another ad, she was shown standing on a fake buttock reading a letter supposedly from her bottom, which writes that 'even bottoms have feelings'.

The Wash Air Seat and the early Washlet operated mechanically, and it took several minutes for the spray to start and for the water to heat. These problems were solved by implementing electronic operation. The Washlet's nozzle was made to extend and retract at an angle of 43 degrees, which prevented any used cleansing water from falling back onto the nozzle ("backwash").

Two TOTO engineers, Mr. Kawakami and Mr. Ito calculated the average location of the human anus with the aid of 300 colleagues who were persuaded to sit on a toilet in private and to mark the positions of their anuses by fixing a small piece of a paper to a wire strung across the seat. The average location of the female vulva was measured in a strip club. In 1987, TOTO launched the first integrated Washlet.

=== From the 1990s: Widespread adoption ===
In 1992, TOTO launched the Neorest, a tank-less toilet with an integrated Washlet. Other manufacturers started producing electronic bidets, without the trademarked term "washlet". Following a toilet-paper shortage arising from the COVID-19 pandemic, the Australian Consumers Association published a discussion of the merits of bidets and "smart toilets", including a wide range of detachable bidet seats.

== In popular culture ==
Electronic bidets have been featured in The Simpsons, South Park and Futurama as "Japanese Toilets".

== See also ==
- Deodorizing toilet seat
- Intelligent toilet
- Self-cleaning toilet seat
- Toilets in Japan
- Washlet
