= Intelligent toilet =

Toilet with built-in technology for hygiene, comfort and health

A smart toilet seat that measures blood pressure, weight, pulse and oxygen levels

An intelligent toilet or smart toilet (sometimes referred to as a modern day bidet) is a bathroom plumbing fixture or type of electronic bidet toilet which incorporates traditional bidet cleansing (for genital, buttocks and anal hygiene), with the added enhancement of modern smart home technology.

Modern intelligent toilets incorporate electronic bidet cleansing functions into a ceramic toilet bowl for a low-profile and modern aesthetic. Intelligent toilet bidet functions are managed through voice command, mobile app or remote control navigation, depending on the toilet's manufacturer, make and model.

Lower-cost options include a detachable toilet seat referred to as an "electronic bidet ("e-bidet")" seat, which are becoming increasingly popular as well.

== Features ==
- Electronic bidet shower for front and rear cleansing
- Seat-warming
- Adjustable water temperature
- Deodorizer
- Air dryer
- Many models offer water-conservative 1.0–1.28 gallons per flush
- Illuminating nightlight

== Hygienic applications ==
Intelligent toilets and electronic bidets alleviate numerous health concerns, especially for users with sensitive or damaged skin. By eliminating fecal bacteria left behind by toilet paper, intelligent toilets also dramatically increase a user's hygiene by preventing the spread of bacteria to each user's hands. Intelligent toilets can aid:

- Skin rashes
- Hemorrhoid discomfort
- Physical limitations (that may make traditional toilet paper wiping difficult)
- Post-childbirth perineum cleansing and soothing

== Environmental applications ==
Intelligent toilets can be environmentally beneficial as they reduce a user's need for toilet paper, saving households money on paper products and allowing users to reduce their paper consumption over time.

Modern high-efficiency intelligent toilets also use 1.0–1.28 gallons of water per flush, reducing water consumption and waste as well.

== History ==
In the 1700s, Bidets introduced throughout numerous European countries as a standard for hygiene and in some countries, contraceptive measures.

Electronic bidets are introduced around the world in the 1980s with popularity slowly growing in Japan, Europe and North America.

By the 2000s, numerous vendors including AXENT Switzerland, American Standard, TOTO, Duravit, and Kohler introduce one-piece, design-conscious electronic bidets. As more suppliers enter the market, electronic bidet toilets become more uniquely-designed while manufacturers begin testing the incorporation of more advanced toilet functions and tools.

In the 2010s smart home technology and home automation gains momentum as homeowners begin incorporating digital lighting, climate, entertainment, appliance and home-monitoring systems into their homes. AXENT Switzerland debuts the user-monitoring and automated intelligent XT-SPA and AXENT.ONE Plus intelligent toilet at the Guangzhou Design Week in November 2017. Kohler promotes the Kohler Konnect concept suite and Veil intelligent toilet at CES in January 2018.

== In popular culture ==
Intelligent toilets have been featured in the comedy Why Him? starring James Franco and Bryan Cranston.

In a 2020 interview, American actor Dennis Quaid also announced that he bought a smart toilet, after being inspired from a stay at Las Vegas hotel. He also discussed his usage of a multiple wireless utilities.

== See also ==
- Bidet
- Electronic bidet
- History of toilets
- Toilets in Japan
