= Bidet =

Bathroom plumbing fixture

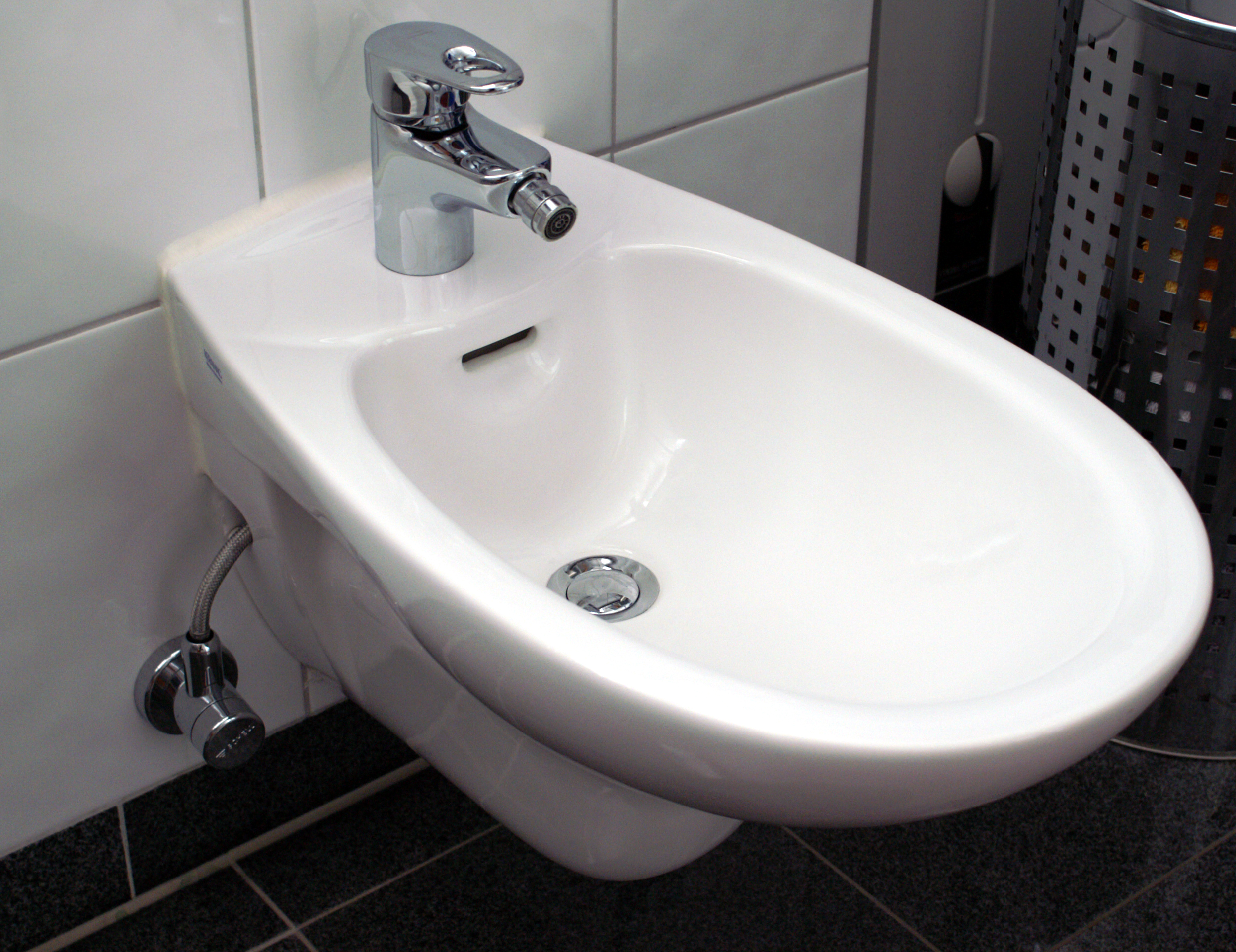
A modern bidet that resembles a traditional washbasin type

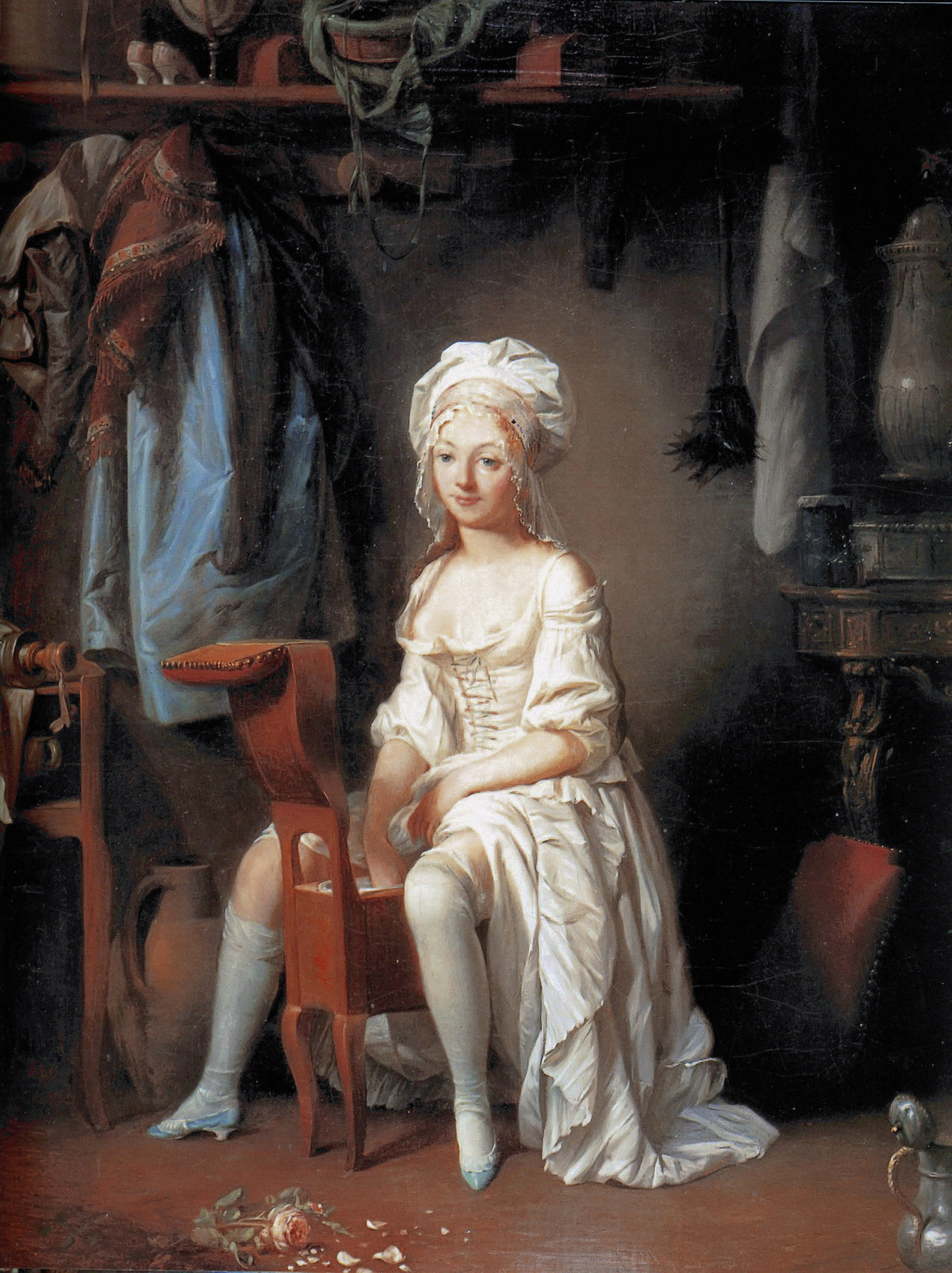
Woman on a Bidet, by Louis-Léopold Boilly, 1790

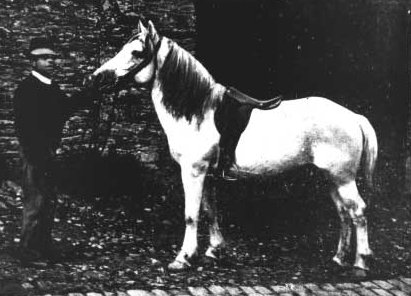
bidet horse, early 1900s

A bidet (UK: /ˈbiːdeɪ/, US: /bɪˈdeɪ/) is a bowl or receptacle designed to be sat upon in order to wash a person's genitalia, perineum, inner buttocks, and anus.

A bidet is a type of small extinct French horse, that named the washing fixture, due to the straddling position adopted in its usage.

The modern variety has a plumbed-in water supply and a drainage opening, and is thus a plumbing fixture subject to local hygiene regulations. The bidet is designed to promote personal hygiene and is used after defecation, and before and after sexual intercourse. It can also be used to wash feet, with or without filling it up with water. Some people even use bidets to bathe babies or pets. In several European countries, a bidet is now required by law to be present in every bathroom containing a toilet bowl. It was originally located in the bedroom, near the chamber-pot and the marital bed, but in modern times is located near the toilet bowl in the bathroom. Fixtures that combine a toilet seat with a washing facility include the electronic bidet.

Opinions as to the necessity of the bidet vary widely over different nationalities and cultures. In cultures that use it habitually, such as parts of Western, Central and Southeastern Europe (especially Italy, Portugal, France and Turkey), Eastern Asia and some Latin American countries such as Argentina, Uruguay or Paraguay, it is considered an indispensable tool in maintaining good personal hygiene. It is regularly used across the Middle East and North African countries, such as Egypt. It is rarely used in sub-Saharan Africa, Northwestern Europe, Australasia, and North America.

== Applications ==
Bidets are primarily used to wash and clean the genitalia, perineum, inner buttocks, and anus. Some bidets feature a vertical jet designed to provide easy access for washing and rinsing the perineum and anal area. The traditional separate bidet resembles a washbasin and is used with running warm water along with specific soaps. Additionally, it can serve many other purposes, such as washing feet.

== Types ==
=== Bidet shower ===
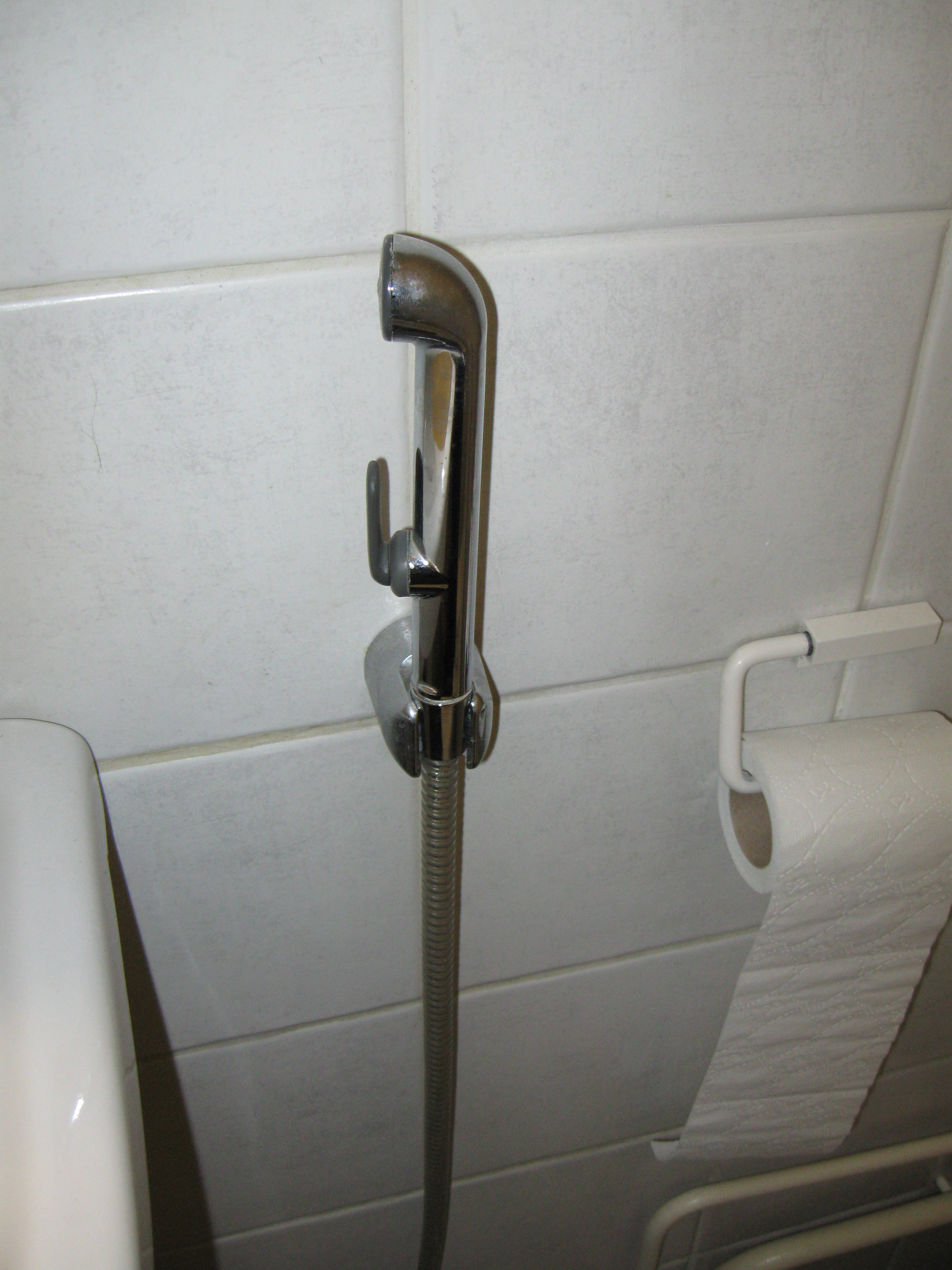
A Finnish bidet shower

A bidet shower (also known as "bidet spray", "bidet sprayer", or "health faucet") is a hand-held triggered nozzle, similar to that on a kitchen sink sprayer, that delivers a spray of water to assist in anal cleansing and cleaning the genitals after defecation and urination. In contrast to a bidet that is integrated with the toilet, a bidet shower has to be held by the hands, and cleaning does not take place automatically. Bidet showers are common in countries where water is considered essential for anal cleansing.

Drawbacks include the possibility of wetting a user's clothing if used carelessly. In addition, a user must be reasonably mobile and flexible to use a hand-held bidet shower.

=== Conventional or standalone bidet ===
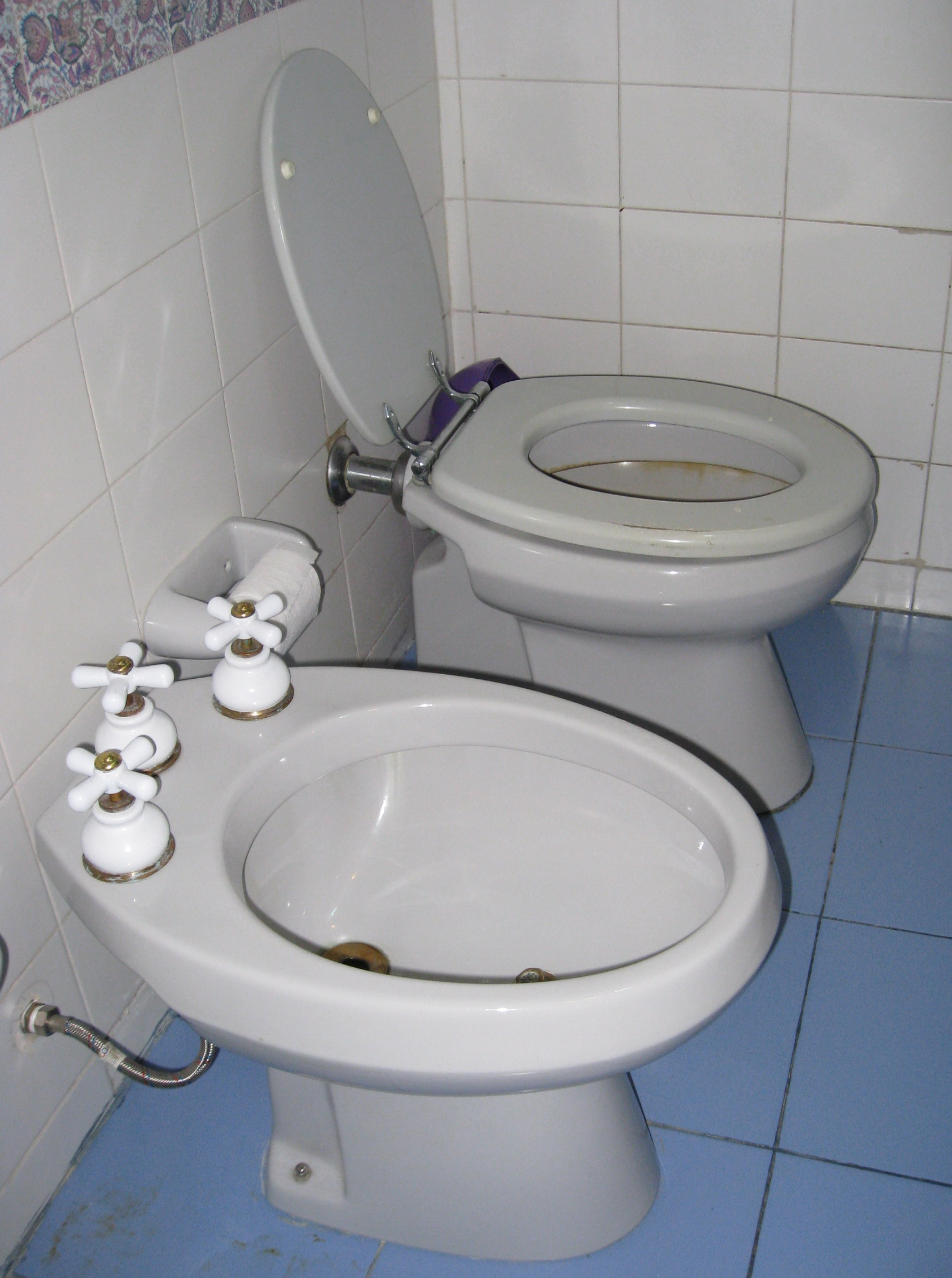
A 20th-century standalone bidet (foreground)

A bidet is a plumbing fixture that is installed as a separate unit in the bathroom besides toilet, shower and sink, which users have to straddle. Some bidets resemble a large hand basin, with taps and a stopper so they can be filled up; other designs have a nozzle that squirts a jet of water to aid in cleansing.

=== Integrated bidets and add-ons ===
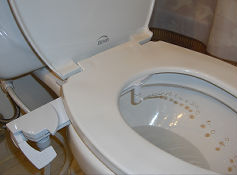
An add-on bidet

There are bidets that are an integrated part of the toilet. Having a nozzle (fixed or movable) that is designed to spray water at the anus, and often also (separately) the genitals. Some have separate nozzles, for anus and genitals. The nozzle is typically at the back of the toilet rim.

Attachments have also been, to provide this functionality to a toilet without integrated bidet, that either attaches to the rim, or replacing the seat, without needing to replace the whole toilet, or finding a toilet that has an integrated bidet.

These bidets (also called "Japanese toilets", "combined toilets", or in the case of add-on versions "bidet attachments" or "add-on bidets") are controlled either mechanically, by turning a valve, or electronically. Electronic bidets are controlled with waterproof electrical switches rather than a manual valve. There are models that have a heating element which blows warm air to dry the user after washing, that offer heated seats, wireless remote controls, illumination through built in night lights, or built in deodorizers and activated carbon filters to remove odours. Further refinements include adjustable water pressure, temperature compensation, and directional spray control.

An add-on bidet typically connects to the existing water supply of a toilet via the addition of a threaded tee pipe adapter, and requires no soldering or other plumbing work. Electronic add-on bidets also require a GFCI protected grounded electrical outlet.

== Usage and health ==
Personal hygiene is improved and maintained more accurately and easily with the use of both toilet paper and a bidet as compared to the use of toilet paper alone. In some add-on bidets with vertical jets, little water is used, and toilet paper may not be necessary. Addressing hemorrhoids and genital health issues might also be facilitated by the use of bidet fixtures.

Because of the large surface of the basin, after-use and routine disinfection of stand-alone bidets require thoroughness, or microbial contamination from one user to the next could take place. Bidet attachments are sometimes included on hospital toilets because of their utility in maintaining hygiene. Hospitals must consider the use of bidets properly and consider the clinical background of patients to prevent cross-infection. Warm-water bidets may harbor dangerous microbes if not properly disinfected.

== Environmental aspects ==
From an environmental standpoint, bidets can reduce the need for toilet paper. Considering that an average person uses only 0.5 litre (1/8 US gallon) of water for cleansing by using a bidet, much less water is used than for manufacturing toilet paper. An article in Scientific American concluded that using a bidet is "much less stressful on the environment than using paper". Scientific American has also reported that if the US switched to using bidets, 15 million trees could be saved every year.

In the US, UK, and some other countries, wet wipes are heavily marketed as an upgrade from dry toilet paper. However, this product has been criticized for its adverse environmental effects, due to the non-biodegradable plastic fibers composing most versions. Although the wipes are promoted as "flushable", they absorb waste fats and agglomerate into massive "fatbergs" which can clog sewer systems and must be cleared at great expense. Bidets are being marketed as cleaning better than toilet paper or wet wipes, with fewer negative environmental effects.

== Society and culture ==
The bidet is common in Catholic countries and required by law in some. It is also found in some traditionally Eastern Orthodox and Protestant countries such as Greece and Finland respectively, where bidet showers are common.

In Islam, there are many strict rules concerning excretion; in particular, anal washing with water is required. Consequently, in Middle Eastern regions where Islam is the predominant religion, water for anal washing is provided in most toilets, usually in the form of a hand-held "bidet shower" or shattaf.

=== Prevalence ===
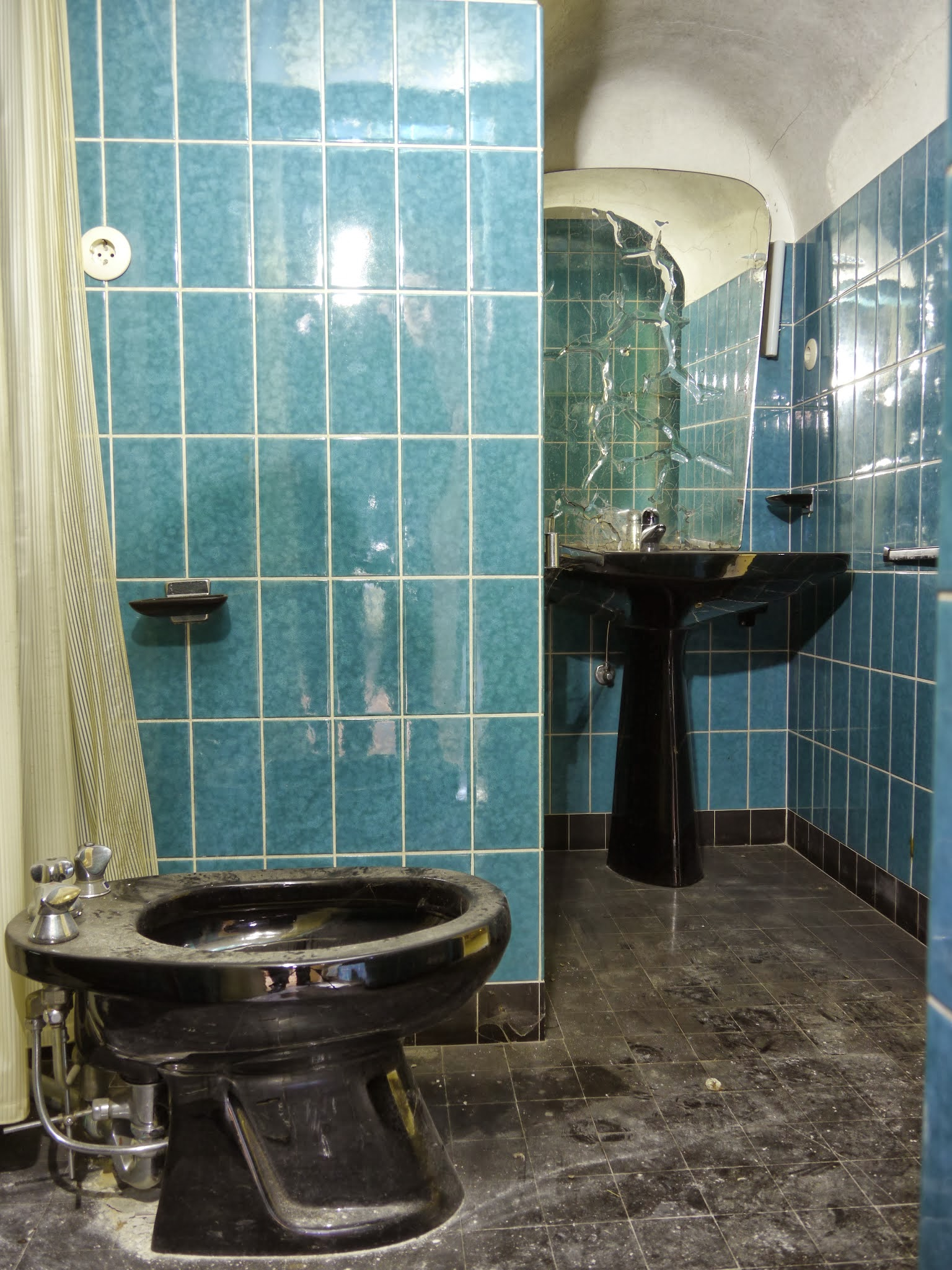
A German bidet installed in the 1960s in its own dedicated space

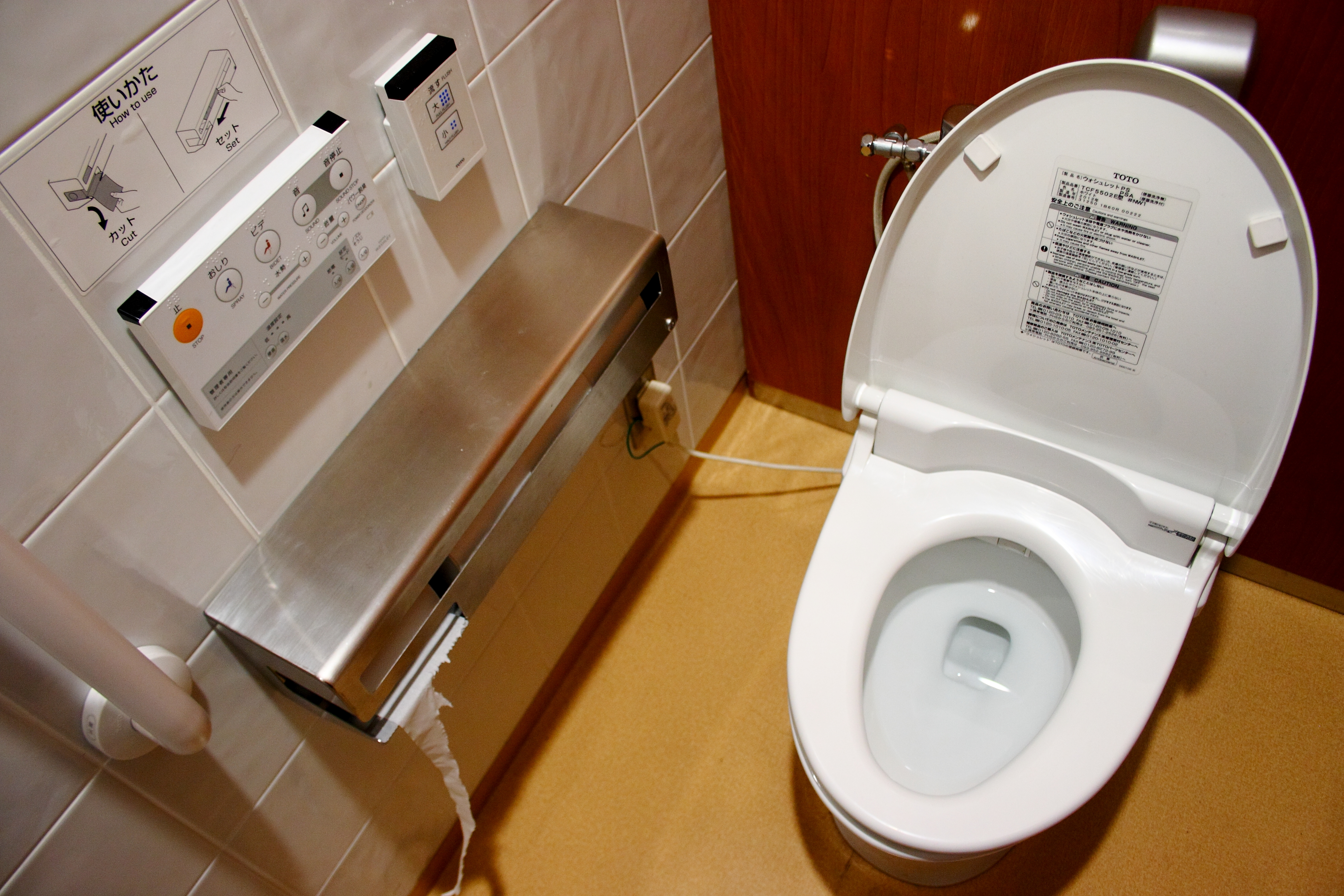
An electronic bidet installed in a Tokyo public toilet

Bidets are becoming increasingly popular with the elderly and disabled. Combined toilet/bidet installations make self-care toileting possible for many people, affording greater independence. There are often special units with higher toilet seats allowing easier wheelchair transfer, and with some form of electronic remote control that benefits an individual with limited mobility or otherwise requiring assistance.

Bidets are common bathroom fixtures in the Arab world and in Catholic countries, such as Italy (the installation of a bidet in a bathroom has been mandatory since 1975), Spain (but in recent times new or renewed houses tend to have bathrooms without bidets, except the luxurious ones), Portugal (installation is mandatory since 1975), and France (present in 95% of households in the 1970s, but dropped to 42% in 1993). They are also found in Southeastern European countries such as Albania, Bosnia and Herzegovina, Romania, Greece and Turkey. They are very popular in some South American countries, particularly Argentina, Paraguay and Uruguay. Electronic bidet-integrated toilets, often with functions such as toilet seat warming, are commonly found in Japan, and are becoming more popular in other Asian countries.

In Northern Europe, bidets are rare, although in Finland, bidet showers are common. Bidet showers are most commonly found in Southeast Asia, South Asia, and the Middle East.

In 1980, the first "paperless toilet" was launched in Japan by manufacturer Toto, a combination of toilet and bidet which also dries the user after washing. These combination toilet-bidets (washlet) with seat warmers, or attachable bidets are particularly popular in Japan and South Korea, and are found in approximately 76% of Japanese households as of 2015. They are commonly found in hotels and some public facilities. These bidet-toilets, along with toilet seat and bidet units (to convert an existing toilet) are sold in many countries, including the United States.

Bidet seat conversions are much easier and lower cost to install than traditional bidets, and have disrupted the market for the older fixtures.

After a slow start in the 1990s, electronic bidets are starting to become more available in the United States. American distributors were directly influenced by their Japanese predecessors, as the founders of Brondell (established in 2003) have indicated. The popularity of add-on bidet units is steadily increasing in the United States, Canada and the United Kingdom, in part because of their ability to treat hemorrhoids or urogenital infections. In addition, shortages of toilet paper due to the coronavirus pandemic have led to an increased interest in bidets.

== Etymology ==
Bidet is a French word for 'pony', and in Old French, bider meant 'to trot'. This etymology comes from the notion that one "rides" or straddles a bidet much like a pony is ridden. The word bidet was used in 15th-century France to refer to the pet ponies that French royalty kept.

== History ==
The bidet appears to have been an invention of French furniture makers in the late 17th century, although no exact date or inventor is known. The earliest written reference to the bidet is in 1710 in France and latter in 1726 in Italy. Although there are records of Maria Carolina of Austria, Queen of Naples and Sicily, requesting a bidet for her personal bathroom in the Royal Palace of Caserta in the second half of the 18th century, the bidet did not become widespread in Italy until after the Second World War. The bidet is possibly associated with the chamber pot and the bourdaloue, the latter being a small, hand-held chamber pot. An early drawing of a water closet from 1770 can be found in L'Art Menuisier by the Parisian carpenter Andre Roubo, which featured a bidet seat with side controls.

Historical antecedents and early functions of the bidet are believed to include devices used for contraception. Bidets are considered ineffective by today's standards of contraception, and their use for that function was quickly abandoned and forgotten following the advent of modern contraceptives such as the pill.

By 1900, due to plumbing improvements, the bidet (and chamber pot) moved from the bedroom to the bathroom and became more convenient to fill and drain.

In 1928, in the United States, John Harvey Kellogg applied for a patent on an "anal douche". While in Schiltach, Baden-Württemberg, Germany, Hans Grohe released the first affordable hand shower.

In 1965, the American Bidet Company featured an adjustable spray nozzle and warm water option, seeking to make the bidet a household item. The fixture was expensive, and required floor space to install; it was eventually discontinued without a replacement model.

In Japan, the INAX Sanitarina 61 (1967) was the first commercial electronic bidet toilet with warm water spray and drying functions. The INAX Sanitarina F1 (1976) bidet toilet introduced a heated toilet seat. Between 1978 and 1980, TOTO developed the first washlet, the Washlet G. It featured warm water spray, heated seat and dryer functions.

The early 1980s saw the popularization of the electronic bidet in Japan, with names such as Clean Sense, Galaxy, Infinity, Novita, and of non-electric attachments such as Gobidet. These devices have attachments that connect to existing toilet water supplies, and can be used in bathrooms lacking the space for a separate bidet and toilet. Many models have additional features, such as instant-heating warm water, night lights, or a heated seat.

In the early 1990s, Rizwan Sajan and Anis Sajan based in Dubai founded the company Danube Group and began selling a handheld bidet shower called Shattaf. It soon became widespread across much of the Arab world and Asia.

== Modern adoption ==
In the early 21st century, bidets and bidet attachments saw increased adoption in regions where they had historically been uncommon, particularly in North America and parts of Northern Europe.

Consumer interest in bidets increased during the COVID-19 pandemic in 2020, when temporary shortages of toilet paper in several countries led some households to seek alternatives. Reports from retailers and industry analysts indicated a corresponding rise in sales of bidet products during this period. Contemporary news coverage described several companies in the bidet attachment market, in the context of this broader rise in consumer interest.

The contemporary bidet market includes a range of product types, from integrated electronic bidet toilets to non-electric bidet attachments, travel bidets, and handheld sprayers. Bidet attachments or seats, which can often be installed on standard toilets without major plumbing modifications, are generally more affordable and accessible than integrated systems.

Environmental considerations are also frequently cited in discussions of bidet adoption, particularly in relation to reducing reliance on toilet paper or wet wipes, though assessments of overall environmental footprint vary depending on usage and product type.

Adoption rates remain uneven globally. Bidets continue to be standard fixtures in countries such as Japan, Italy, and South Korea, while in other regions they are more commonly used as aftermarket additions rather than integrated bathroom fixtures.

== See also ==
- Anal hygiene
- Cleanliness
- Ecological sanitation
- Feminine hygiene
- Improved sanitation
- Infection prevention and control
- Istinja
- Public health
- Sustainable sanitation
- Tabo (hygiene)
- Toilet seat
- Toilets in Japan
- Washlet
