= Sitz bath =

Bath in which a person sits in water up to the hips

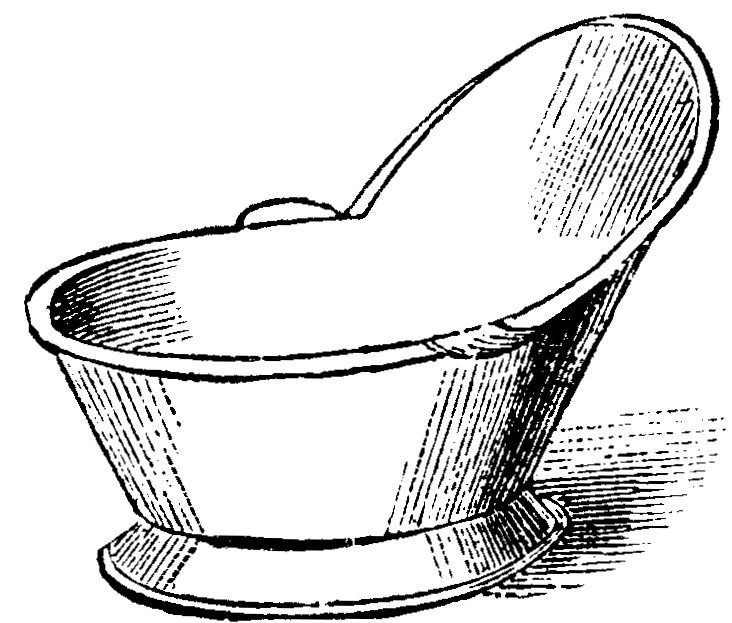
- From Scammell's Cyclopedia of Useful Receipts (1897)
- Specialty: Rehabilitative medicine

A sitz bath or hip bath is a bathtub in which a person sits in water up to the hips. It is used to relieve discomfort and pain in the lower part of the body, for example, due to hemorrhoids (piles), anal fissures, perianal fistulas, rectal surgery, an episiotomy, uterine cramps, inflammatory bowel disease, pilonidal cysts and infections of the bladder, prostate or vagina. It works by keeping the affected area clean and increasing the flow of blood to it.

Such hip baths were originally a European custom, although modern sitz baths are used mainly for therapeutic purposes. The term sitz bath is derived from the German word Sitzbad, meaning a bath (Bad) in which one sits (sitzen).

== Preparation ==
Sitz baths may either be warm or cool, or alternating between the two. Substances such as salt, baking soda, or vinegar may be added to the water.

Warm baths are recommended for reducing the itching, pain and discomfort associated with conditions such as hemorrhoids and genital problems. An ordinary bathtub can be filled with 3 to 4 inches (7.6 to 10.2 cm) of hot water (about 110 °F (43 °C)), and sat in for 15–20 minutes or until the water cools down. Alternatively, a large basin can be used, and there are specially built devices that fit into toilet bowls.

Cool sitz baths are said to be helpful in easing constipation, inflammation and vaginal discharge, and, in cases of fecal or urinary incontinence, in toning the muscles.

Several variations of the procedure can be used, with different therapeutic effects depending on the temperature of the water, the length of time spent immersed and the method of immersion (such as dipping and 'hot and cold alternate'). Some people find that alternating three to five times between a hot bath for 3–4 minutes and an ice-cold bath for 30–60 seconds is soothing. A towel soaked in cold water can be used in place of a cold bath.

For most purposes sitz baths with water are sufficient, though some people prefer to use saline water or water mixed with baking soda. The use of such additives helps to reduce infections. People with candidiasis (a vaginal yeast infection) may benefit from a warm bath with salt and vinegar.

Electronic bidets which irrigate the anal region with a flow of warm water have been compared with sitz baths, and found to produce very similar reduction in anal pressure, with no change in temperature, if used with low-pressure warm water. Some electronic bidets have a dedicated "sitz" function.

== Benefits ==
A warm sitz bath could be helpful to relieve congestion and edema by aiding venous return from the perianal area. Its major effect is thought to be due to the reductions of spasms by relaxing the anal sphincter pressure, reducing anal pain. It has benefits for patients with elevated anal pressure due to anorectal diseases such as anal fissure or inflamed hemorrhoids, and after surgical operations involving the anus.

== Risks ==
Sitz baths are considered very low risk. Because hot baths cause blood vessels to dilate, on rare occasions some people can feel dizzy or have palpitations (rapid or abnormal heartbeat). People prone to such occurrences are advised to have someone standing by to assist them.
