= Toto Ltd. =

Japanese plumbing fixtures and semiconductor company

TOTO Ltd.
- Logo used since 1969

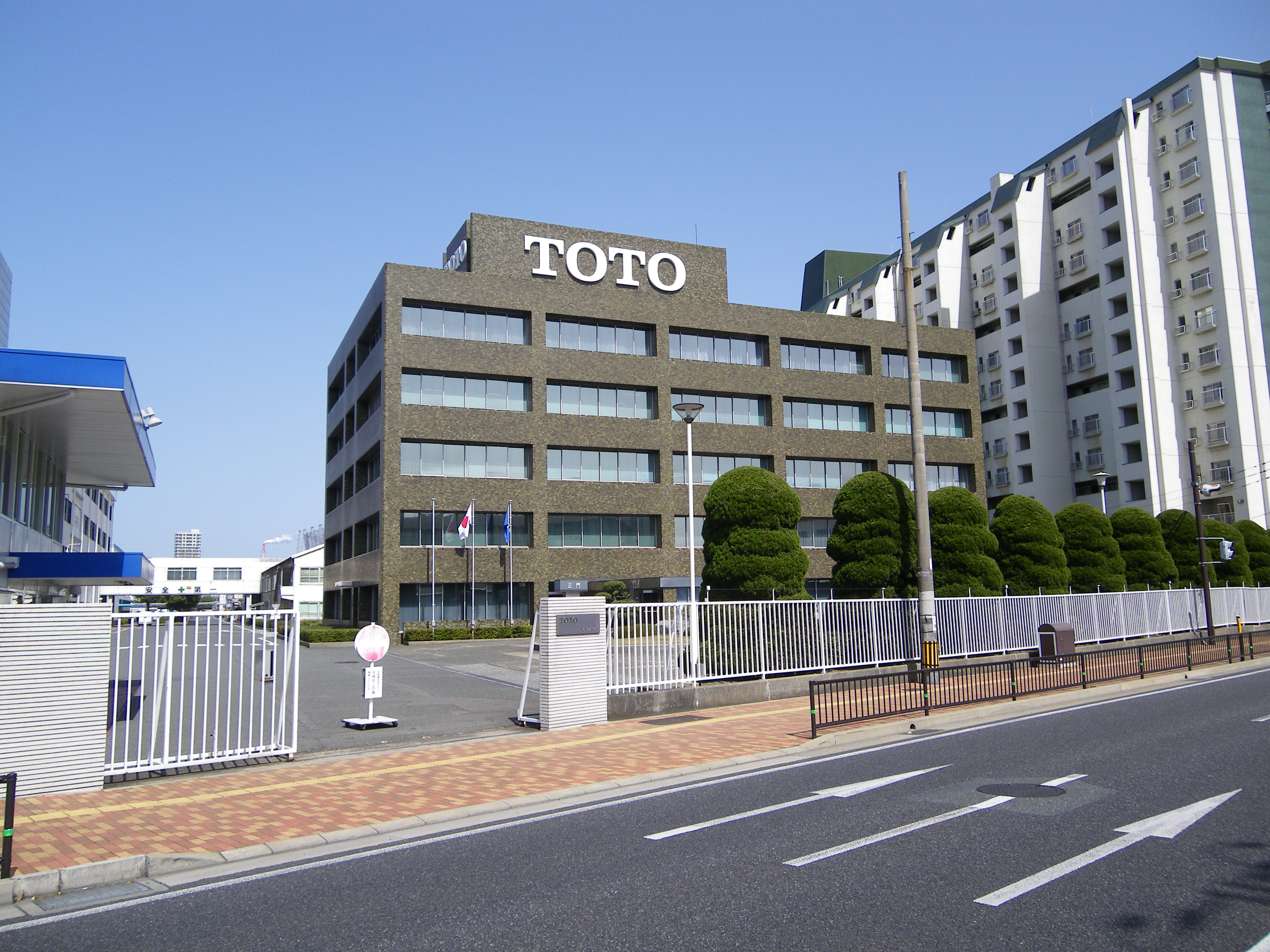
- Toto's headquarters in Kokurakita-ku, Kitakyushu, Japan
- Native name: TOTO(トートー)株式会社
- Romanized name: TŌTŌ kabushiki gaisha
- Formerly: Toyo Toki Company, Limited (1917-1970); Toto Kiki Ltd. (1970-2007)
- Type: Public
- Traded as: TYO: 5332; NAG: 5332; FSE: 5332; Nikkei 225 component (TYO)
- Industry: Manufacturing / Ceramics
- Founded: 15 May 1917; 109 years ago (as Toyo Toki Company)
- Headquarters: Kokurakita-ku, Kitakyushu, Fukuoka Prefecture, Japan
- Area served: Worldwide (especially Asia)
- Key people: Kunio Harimoto (Representative Director, Chairman); Madoka Kitamura (President, Representative Director); Noriaki Kiyota (Representative Director, Executive Vice President); Nozomu Morimura (Representative Director, Executive Vice President)
- Products: Plumbing fixtures
- Revenue: ▲¥573,819 million (consolidated, March 2017)
- Operating income: ▲¥48,571 million (consolidated, March 2017)
- Net income: ▲¥33,839 million (consolidated, March 2017)
- Total assets: ▲¥553,996 million (consolidated, March 2017)
- Total equity: ▲¥297,020 million (consolidated, March 2017)
- Number of employees: Consolidated: 33,431; Non-consolidated: 8,034 (as of March 31, 2019)
- Website: www.toto.com; jp.toto.com

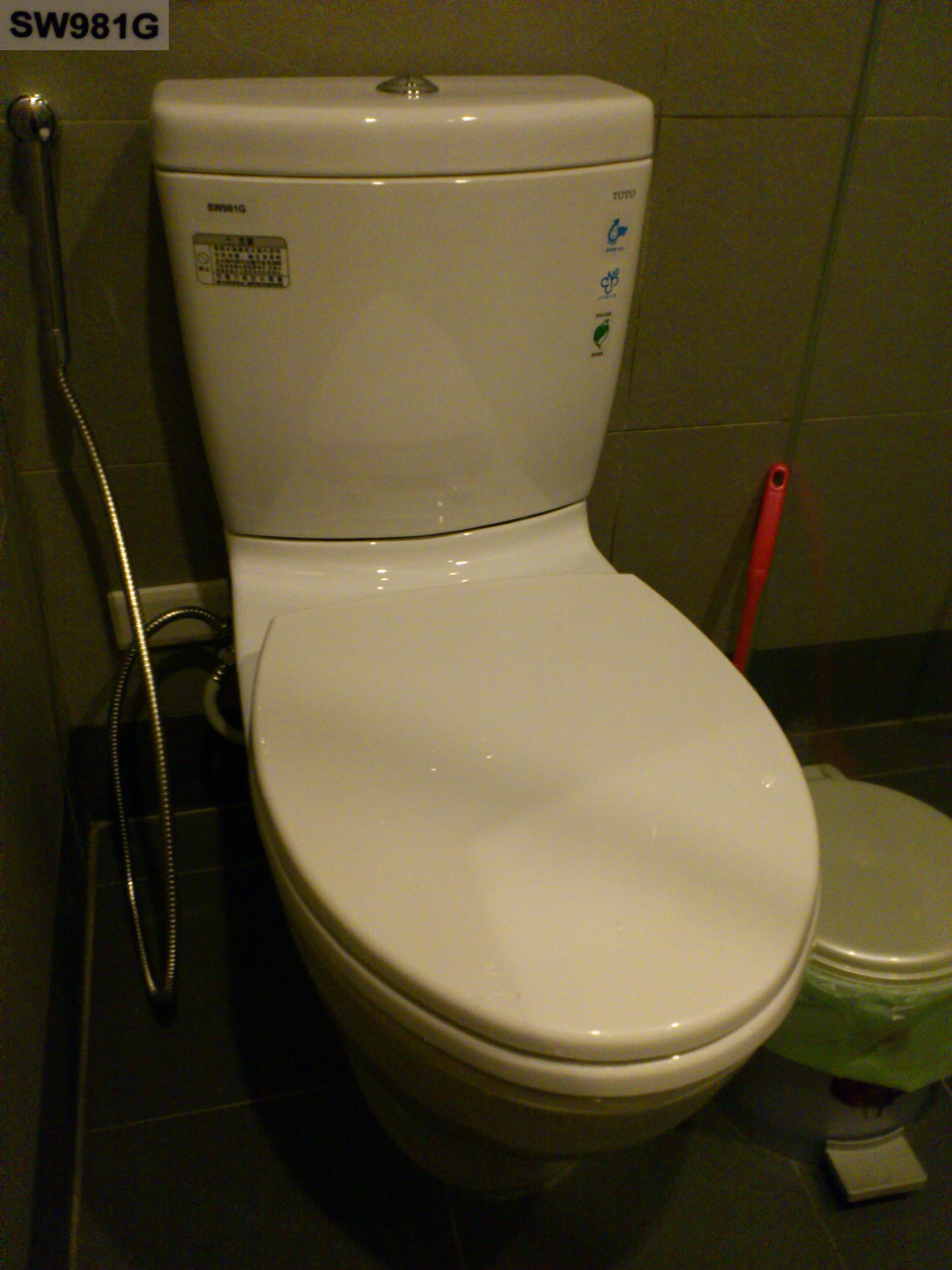
Toto SW981G「カゴット」toilet

Toto Ltd. (TOTO(トートー)株式会社, Tōtō kabushiki gaisha), formerly known as Tōyō Tōki (東洋陶器株式会社; lit. 'Oriental Pottery Company'), and Tōtō Kiki (東陶機器株式会社; lit. 'Tōtō Equipment Company'), is a Japanese multinational plumbing fixtures and semiconductor manufacturer which is famous for manufacturing the Washlet (as well as the Warmlet and similar products). Toto was founded in 1917. The company is based in Kitakyushu, Japan, and owns production facilities in nine countries.

Toto acquired the German toilet manufacturer Pagette in 2009 and has been supplying the European market through this company since it first appeared at the 2009 International Sanitary and Heating Fair. The company has had its European headquarters in Düsseldorf since 2012. The pre-wall specialist Tece from Emsdetten manufactures the modules for the toilets.

== Washlet ==
The Washlet (ウォシュレット, Woshuretto) is a toilet seat that features an integrated bidet. The bidet feature activates at the push of a button on the seat or by remote control; a small wand extends from the back of the rim and begins to jet water towards the backside of the user. Different Washlet models have features such as air fresheners, seat heaters, and dryers.

== Advanced ceramics ==
Toto also operates an advanced ceramics business that manufactures components for semiconductor manufacturing equipment, including electrostatic chucks, ceramic AD films and engineering ceramics. In 2026, Financial Times reported that Toto was the world's second-largest producer of electrostatic chucks used in NAND memory chip manufacturing, and that the division accounted for more than half of the company’s operating profit.

== Expansion ==
In 2017, their factory in Thailand reported plans to double production output to nearly double annual production to 870,000 units. In 2019, Toto opened a new branch of Tilottoma Bangla Group in Dhaka, Bangladesh. In 2025, Toto opened a new factory in Morrow, Georgia.

== See also ==
- Toilets in Japan
