= Toilets in Japan =

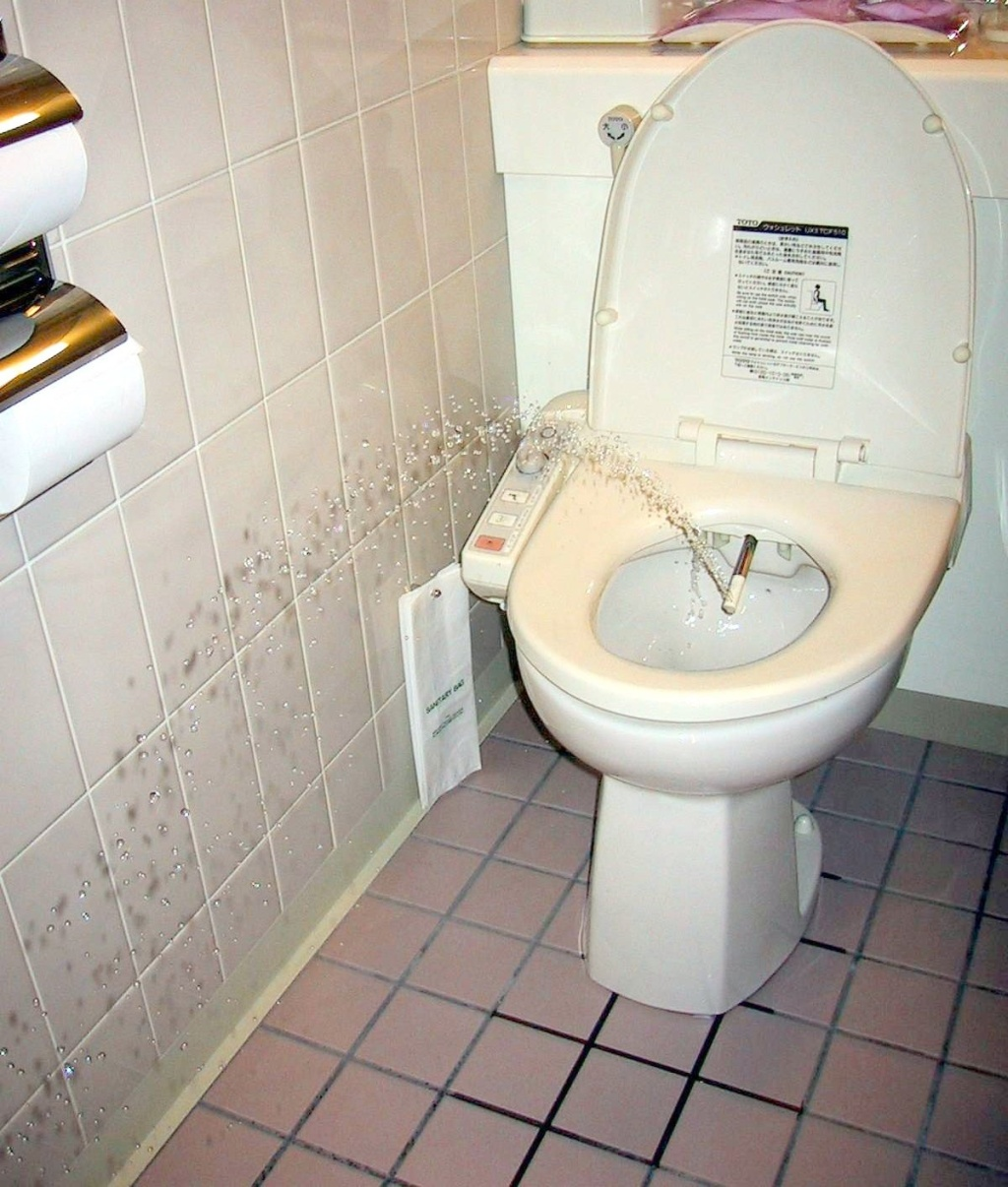
A cleansing jet of water designed to cleanse the anus of the user of this bidet-style toilet

High-tech washlets with control panel

Toilets in Japan are sometimes designed more elaborately than toilets commonly seen in other developed nations. European toilets occasionally have a separate bidet whilst Japan combines an electronic bidet with the toilet. The current state of the art for Western-style toilets in Japan is the bidet toilet, which as of March 2016 is installed in 81% of Japanese households. In Japan, these bidets are commonly called washlets, a brand name of Toto Ltd., and they may include many advanced features rarely seen outside of Asia. The basic feature set commonly found on washlets consists of anal hygiene, bidet washing, seat warming, and deodorization.

== Terminology ==
The word toire (トイレ) is an abbreviated form of the English language word "toilet", and is used both for the toilet itself and for the room where it is located.

A common euphemism is otearai (お手洗い; lit. "hand-washing"). This is similar to the usage in US English of "washroom", which literally means a room where something is washed, and "toilet", which literally refers to the act of self-cleaning. It is also common to see another loan translation, keshōshitsu (化粧室; lit. "powder room"), on signs in department stores and supermarkets, as well as accompanying the public toilet pictogram.

The plain word for toilet is benjo (便所; "place of convenience" or "place of excrement"), from the word ben (便) meaning "convenience" or "excrement", and this word is fairly common. It is often used in elementary schools, public swimming baths, and other such public places, and is not especially impolite, although some may prefer to use a more refined word. In many children's games, a child who is tagged "out" is sent to a special place, such as the middle of a circle, called the benjo. Japanese has many other words for places reserved for excretory functions, including kawaya (厠) and habakari (憚り), but most are rare or archaic.

The toilet itself—that is, the bowl or in-floor receptacle, the water tank, et cetera—is called benki (便器). The toilet seat is benza (便座). A potty, either for small children or for the elderly or infirm, is called omaru (sometimes written 御虎子).

The Japan Toilet Association celebrates an unofficial Toilet Day on November 10, because in Japan the numbers 11/10 (for the month and the day) can be read as ii-to(ire), which also means "Good Toilet".

== Types of toilets ==
There are two styles of toilets commonly found in Japan; the oldest type is a simple squat toilet, which is still common in public conveniences. After World War II, modern Western-type flush toilets and urinals became common.

=== Squat toilet ===
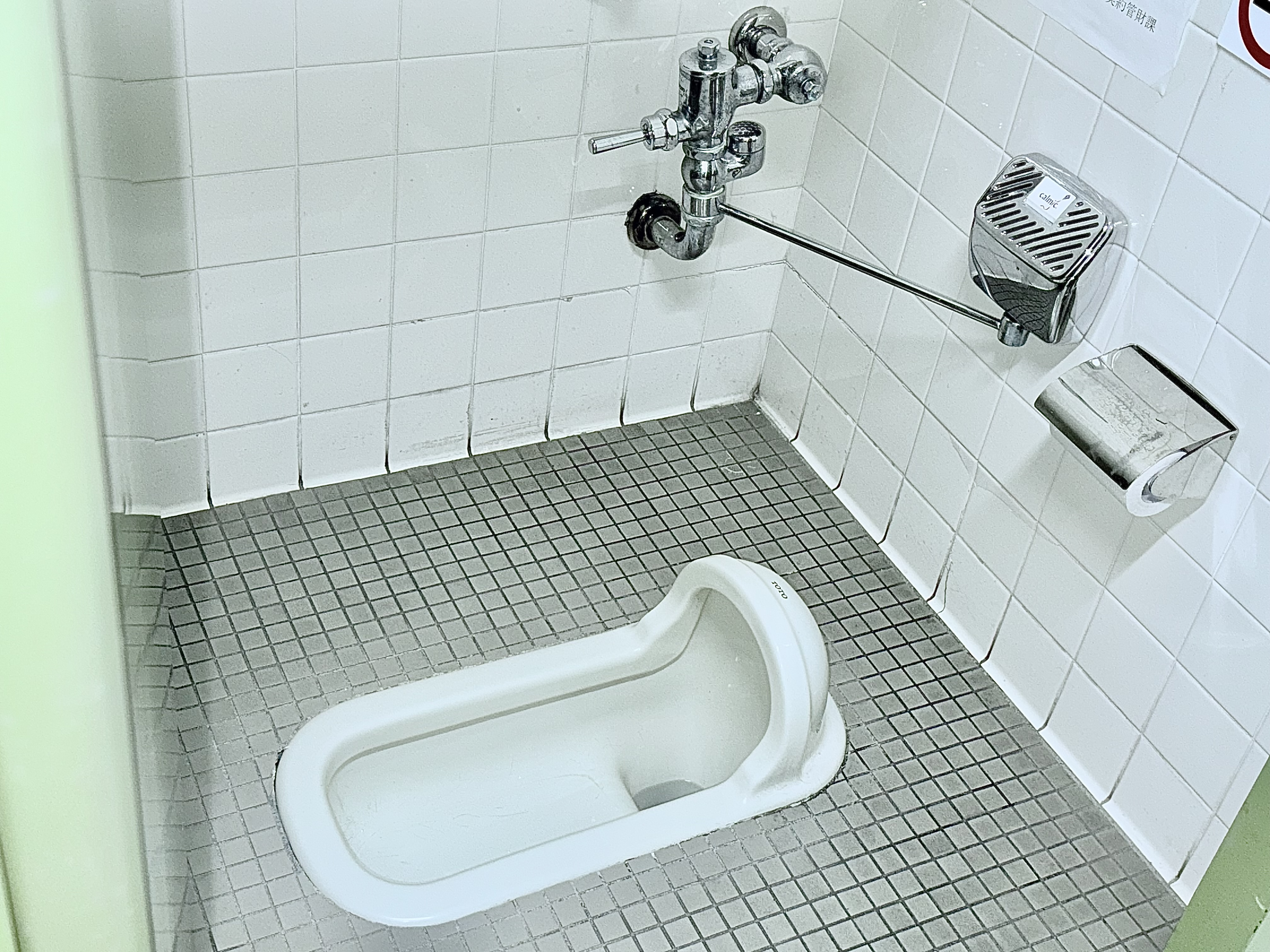
A contemporary Japanese squat toilet

The traditional Japanese-style (和式, washiki) toilet is the squat toilet. A squat toilet differs from a sitting toilet in both construction and method of employment. A squat toilet essentially looks like a miniature urinal set horizontally into the floor. Most squat toilets in Japan are made of porcelain, although in some cases (as on trains) stainless steel is used instead. The user squats over the toilet, facing the hemispherical hood, i.e., the wall in the back of the toilet in the picture seen on the right. A shallow trough collects the waste, instead of a large water-filled bowl as in a Western toilet. All other fixtures, such as the water tank, piping, and flushing mechanism, may be identical to those of a Western toilet.

Flushing causes water to push the waste matter from the trough into a collecting reservoir which is then emptied, with the waste carried off into the sewer system. The flush is often operated in the same manner as a Western toilet, though some have pull handles or pedals instead. Many Japanese toilets have two kinds of flush: "small" (小) and "large" (大). The difference is in the amount of water used. The former is for urine (in Japanese, literally "small excretion") and the latter for feces ("large excretion"). Often, the lever is pushed to the "small" setting to provide a continuous masking noise for privacy, as discussed below.

=== Hybrid squat/sitting toilet ===
A combination squat/sitting toilet also exists, where a seat can be flipped down over a squat toilet, and the toilet can be used essentially the same way as the Western style. This hybrid seems to be common only in rural areas for the benefit of resident foreigners. Adapters that sit on top of the Japanese toilet to convert it to a functional sit-down toilet are much more common. There are also permanently installed extensions available to convert a squat toilet into a sitting-style washlet.

=== "Western-style" ===
A flush toilet which has a pedestal for sitting is known in Japan as a Western-style (洋式, yōshiki) toilet, more commonly known as the sitting toilet. Western-style toilets, including high tech toilets, are now more common in Japanese homes than the traditional squat toilets, though some older apartments retain stickers on the toilet or in its room illustrating the proper way to use it for urination and defecation. Many public toilets at schools, temples, and train stations are still equipped with only squat toilets. In their own homes, however, Japanese people prefer being able to sit, especially older or physically disabled individuals for whom prolonged squatting is physically demanding or uncomfortable. Like Japanese toilets, many Western toilets have two kinds of flush: "small" (小) and "large" (大). The difference is in the amount of water used.

== Japanese bidets (washlet) ==
The modern toilet in Japan, in English sometimes called Super Toilet, and commonly known in Japanese as Washlet (ウォシュレット, Woshuretto) or as warm-water cleaning toilet seat (温水洗浄便座, onsui senjō benza) has many features. The Toto product Washlet Zoe is listed in Guinness World Records as the world's most sophisticated toilet, with seven functions. However, as the model was introduced in 1997, it is now likely to be inferior to the latest model by Toto, Neorest. The idea for the washlet came from abroad, and the first toilet seat with integrated bidet was produced in Switzerland by Closomat in 1957. The age of the high-tech toilet in Japan started in 1980 with the introduction of the Washlet G Series by Toto, and since then the product name washlet has been used to refer to all types of Japanese high-tech toilets. As of 2002, almost half of all private homes in Japan have such a toilet, exceeding the number of households with a personal computer. While the toilet looks like a Western-style toilet at first glance, there are numerous additional features—such as blow dryer, seat heating, massage options, water jet adjustments, automatic lid opening, automatic flushing, Wireless control panel, room heating and air conditioning for the room—included either as part of the toilet or in the seat. These features can be accessed by an (often wireless) control panel attached to the seat or mounted on a nearby wall.

=== Basic features ===
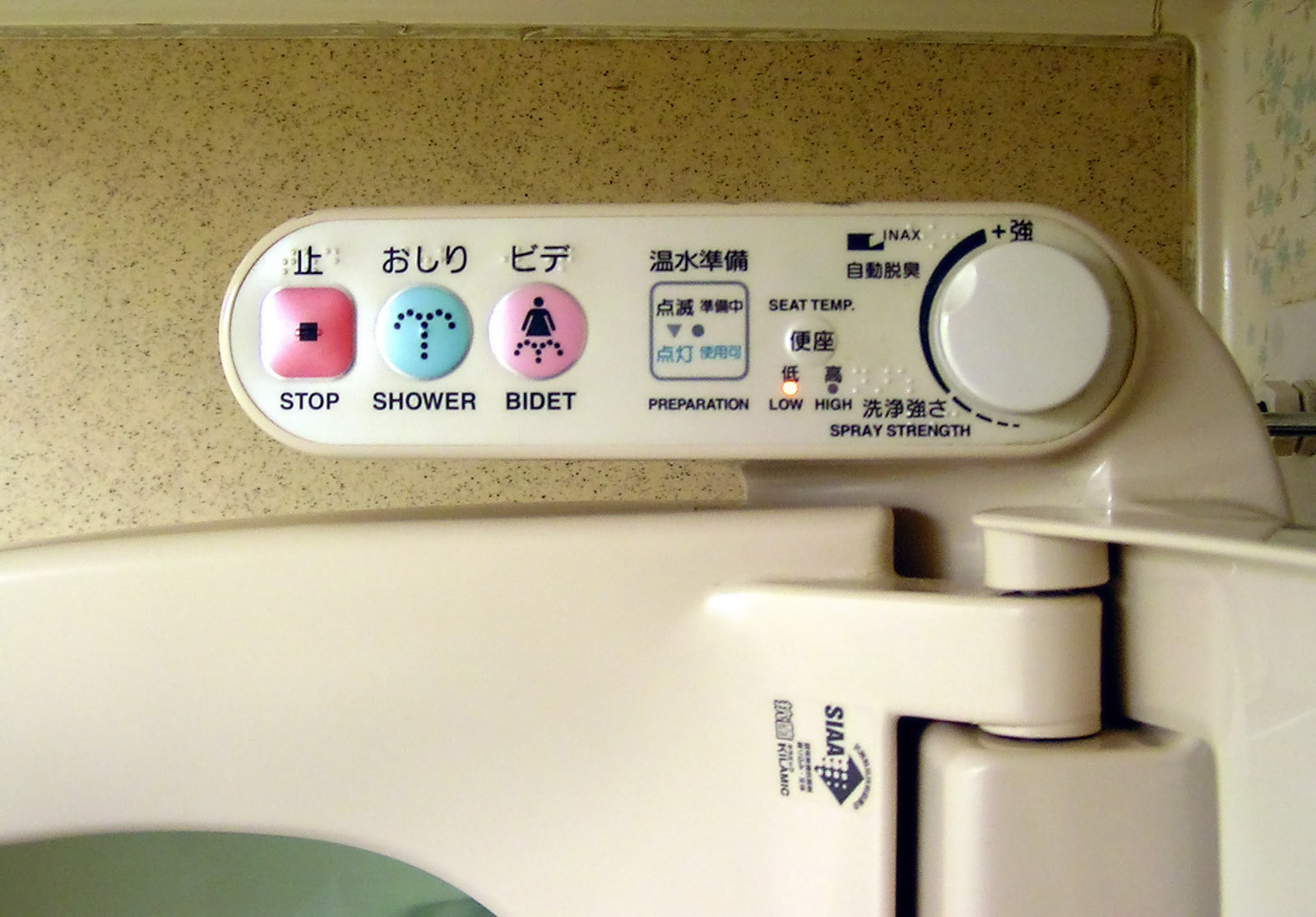
Control elements of a modern Japanese toilet

The most basic feature is the integrated bidet, a nozzle the size of a pencil that comes out from underneath the toilet seat and squirts water. It has two settings: one for washing the anus and one for the bidet function. The former is called posterior wash, general use, or family cleaning, and the latter is known as feminine cleaning, feminine wash or simply bidet. At no point does the nozzle actually touch the body of the user. The nozzle is also self-cleaning and cleans itself before and after operation.

The user can select to wash the anus or vulva by pressing the corresponding button on the control panel. Usually the same nozzle is used for both operations, but at a different position of the nozzle head, and using different openings in the nozzle to squirt water at a different angle to aim for the correct spot. Occasionally, two nozzles are used, each dedicated for one area. The control logic is also attached to a pressure switch or a proximity sensor in the toilet seat, and operates only when the seat is occupied. The very first models did not include this automatic switch-off.

The seat-heating feature is very common, found even on toilets that lack the bidet features. As most Japanese homes lack central heating—instead using space heating—the bathroom may be only a few degrees above freezing in the winter.

=== Customization ===
Most high-tech toilets allow water temperature and water pressure to be adjusted to match the preferences of the user. By default, the vulva receives less pressure than the anus. Researchers in Japan have found that most users prefer a water temperature slightly above body temperature, with 38 °C (100 °F) considered optimal. The nozzle position can also often be manually adjusted forward or aft. High-end washlets allow selection of vibrating and pulsating jets of water, claimed by manufacturers to be beneficial for constipation and hemorrhoids. The most advanced washlets can mix the water jet with soap for an improved cleaning process.

The washlet can replace toilet paper completely, but many users opt to use both wash and paper in combination—although use of paper may be omitted for cleaning of the vulva. Some wipe before washing, some wash before wiping, some wash only, and some wipe only—each according to their preference. Another frequent feature is a blow dryer, often adjustable between 40 °C (104 °F) and 60 °C, (140 °F) used to dry the washed areas.

=== Advanced features ===
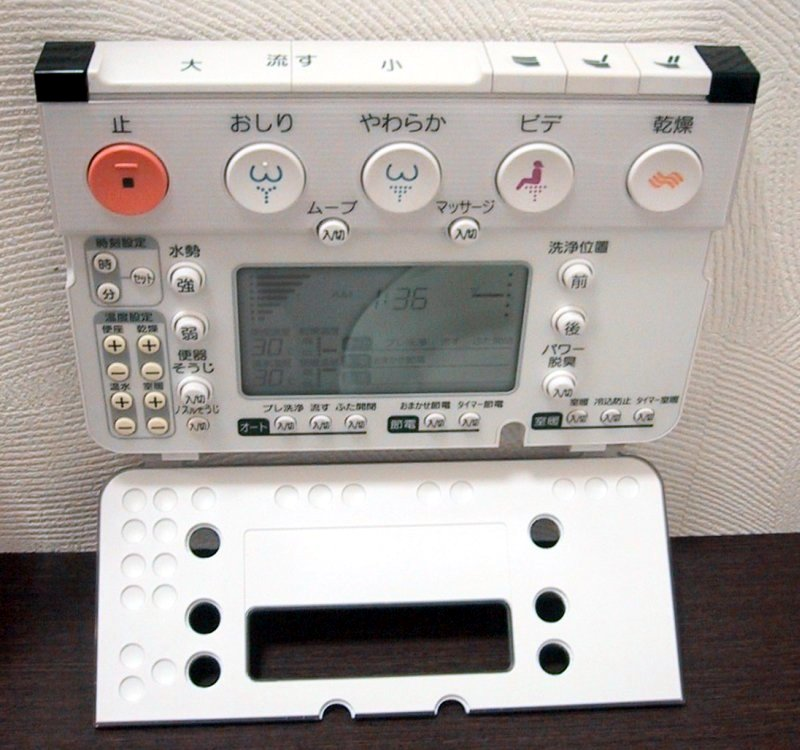
A high-end wireless toilet control panel with 38 buttons and liquid-crystal display

Additional features may include a heated seat, which may be adjustable from 30 °C (86 °F) to 40 °C (104 °F), an automatic lid equipped with a proximity sensor, which opens and closes based on the location of the user; and an air dryer and deodorizer. Some play music to relax the user's sphincter (some INAX toilets, for example, play the first few phrases of Op. 62 Nr. 6 Frühlingslied by Felix Mendelssohn). Other features are automatic flushing, automatic air deodorizing, and a germ-resistant surface. Some models specially designed for the elderly may include armrests and devices that help the user to stand back up after use. A soft close feature slows the toilet lid down while closing so the lid does not slam onto the seat, or in some models, the toilet lid will close automatically a certain time after flushing.

The most recent introduction is an ozone deodorant system that can quickly eliminate smells. Also, the latest models store the times of day when the toilet is used and have a power-saving mode that warms the toilet seat only during times when the toilet is likely to be used based on historic usage patterns. Some toilets also glow in the dark or may even have air conditioning below the rim for hot summer days. Another recent innovation is intelligent sensors that detect someone standing in front of the toilet and initiate an automatic raising of the lid (if the person is facing away from the toilet) or the lid and seat together (if someone is facing the toilet).

=== Self-cleaning ===
Japanese toilets with washlets increasingly have features intended to reduce the frequency with which manual cleaning is required.

Many models will spray a film of water prior to use to prevent waste from bonding to the bowl prior to flushing. Still others will spray a small amount of mild detergent, this has the added benefit of breaking the surface tension of the water, preventing urine or solid waste from splashing during use. Some models will spray electrolyzed water after use to disinfect the bowl.

Air ionizers are sometimes included with claims of microbe reduction when the lid is closed. Recently, there has been development in using photocatalytic glazes and ultraviolet light to clean the bowl.

=== Controls ===
Text explaining the controls of these toilets tends to be in Japanese only. Although many of the buttons often have pictograms, the flush button is often written only in kanji, meaning that non-Japanese users may initially find it difficult to locate the correct button.

In January 2017, The Japan Sanitary Equipment Industry Association, a consortium of companies producing plumbing products including Toto Ltd., Panasonic, and Toshiba, has agreed to unify the iconography used on the often baffling control panels for Japanese toilets. The toilet manufacturers plan to implement the eight new pictogram on models released from 2017 onward, with a view to the system becoming an international standard.

=== Future developments ===
Recently, researchers have added medical sensors into these toilets, which can measure the blood sugar based on the urine, and also measure the pulse, blood pressure, and the body fat content of the user. Talking toilets that greet the user have also started being made. Other measurements are currently being researched. The data may automatically be sent to a doctor through a built-in internet-capable cellular telephone. However, these devices are still very rare in Japan, and their future commercial success is difficult to predict. A voice-operated toilet that understands verbal commands is under development. Toto, NAiS (a division of Panasonic), and other companies also produce portable, battery-operated travel washlets, which must be filled with warm water before use.

=== Washlet Syndrome ===
The repetitive use of a "type water jet on a high-pressure setting for an enema, can weaken the capability for self-evacuation of the Washlet user, which can lead to more serious constipation." If a Washlet high-pressure water jet is used on the anus repeatedly, it may cause excessive cleanliness, prompting other bacteria to adhere around the anus, causing skin disease (inflammation) around the anus. Some proctologists in Japan have named this "Washlet Syndrome" (ウォシュレット症候群, woshuretto shoukougun) or "Warm-water toilet seat Syndrome" (温水便座症候群, on-sui ben-za shoukougun).

There have been claims of benefit in preventing urinary tract infections and also concerns that washlet use can cause increased risk of urinary tract infection, aggravate vaginal flora when the bidet feature is used, and cause cross-contamination from the wand or water tank, but the effects appear to be minimal and neither a substantial risk nor of measurable benefit for healthy adults.

== Urinals ==
Urinals in Japan are very similar to the urinals in the rest of the world, and are mainly used for public male toilets or male toilets with a large number of users.

Female urinals never caught on in Japan, although there were attempts made to popularize the American Sanistand female urinal by the Japanese toilet manufacturing company Toto between 1951 and 1968. This device was shaped like a cone and placed on the floor. However, those were never very popular, and only a few of them remain, including those underneath the now-demolished National Olympic Stadium from the 1964 Summer Olympics in Tokyo, which was added to accommodate people from a wide range of cultures.

== Japan-specific accessories ==
Toilets in Japan have very similar accessories as most toilets worldwide, including toilet paper, a toilet brush, a sink, etc. However, there are some Japan-specific accessories that are rarely found outside Japan.

=== The Sound Princess ===
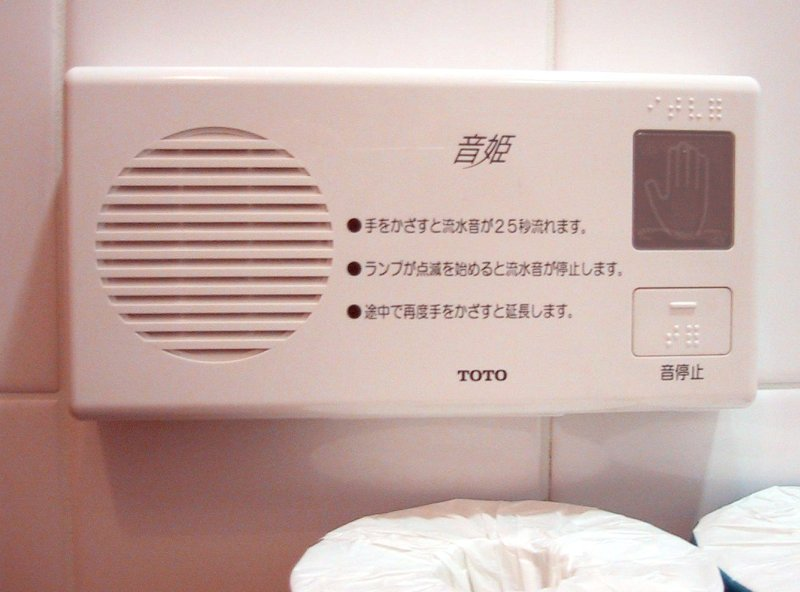
An Otohime, which produces the sound of flushing water in women's rooms in Japan to cover the potentially shameful noise of women urinating. The black square is the motion sensor that activates the sound.

Many Japanese women are embarrassed at the possibility of others hearing their urination. To cover the sound of bodily functions, many women used to flush public toilets continuously while using them, wasting a large amount of water in the process. Persuasion campaigns did not stop this practice, so a device was introduced in the 1980s that, when activated, produces the sound of flushing water. A Toto brand name commonly found is the Otohime (音姫; lit. "Sound Princess", also homophone with a legendary goddess Otohime). This device is now routinely placed in most new public women's rooms, and many older public women's rooms have been upgraded.

The Otohime may be either a separate battery-operated device attached to the wall of the toilet, or included in an existing washlet. The device is activated by pressing a button, or by the wave of a hand in front of a motion sensor. When activated, the device creates a loud flushing sound similar to a toilet being flushed. This sound either stops after a preset time or can be halted through a second press on the button. It is estimated that this saves up to 20 litres (4.4 imp gal; 5.3 US gal) of water per use. However, some women believe that the Otohime sounds artificial and prefer to use a continuous flushing of the toilet instead of the recorded flush of the Otohime.

=== Toilet slippers ===
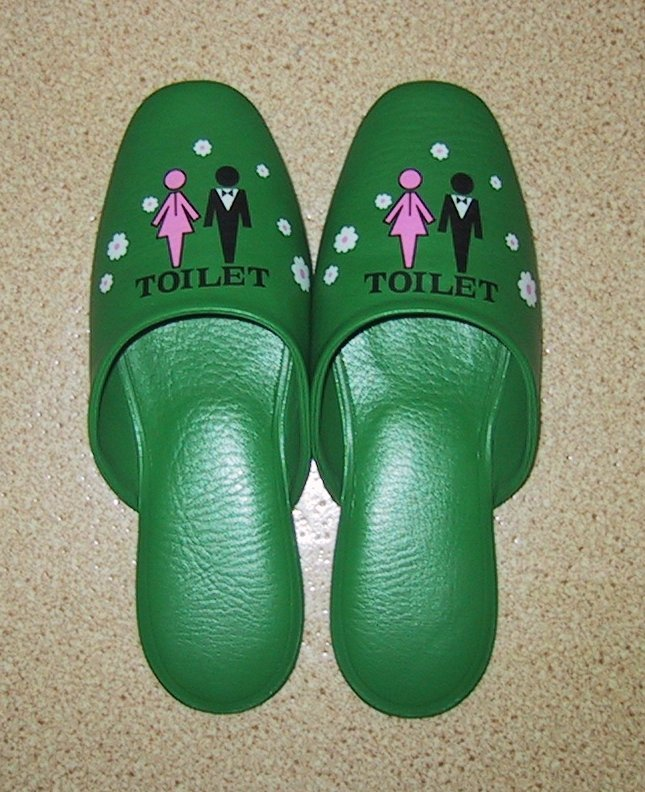
A pair of toilet slippers

In Japanese culture, there is a tendency to separate areas into "clean" and "unclean", and the contact between these areas is minimized. For example, the inside of the house is considered a clean area, whereas the outside of the house is considered unclean. To keep the two areas separated, shoes are taken off before entering the house so that the unclean shoes do not touch the "clean" area inside of the house. Historically, toilets were located outside of the house, and shoes were worn for a trip to the toilet. Nowadays, the toilet is almost always inside the home and hygienic conditions have improved significantly, but the toilet is still considered an "unclean" area.

To further minimize contact between the "unclean" toilet floor and the "clean" floor in the rest of the house, many private homes and also some public toilets have toilet slippers (トイレスリッパ, toire surippa) in front of the toilet door that should be used when in the toilet and removed immediately after leaving the toilet. This also indicates if the toilet is in use. They can be as simple as a pair of rubber slippers, decorated slippers with prints of anime characters for small children, or even animal fur slippers. A frequent faux pas of foreigners is to forget to take off the toilet slippers after a visit to the restroom, and then use these in the non-toilet areas, hence mixing the "clean" and "unclean" areas.

== Public toilets ==
Public toilets are usually readily available all over Japan, and can be found in department stores, supermarkets, book stores, CD shops, parks, most convenience stores, and in all but the most rural train stations. Some older public toilet buildings lack doors, meaning that men using the urinals are in full view of people walking past. Beginning in the 1990s, there has been a movement to make public toilets cleaner and more hospitable than they had been in the past.

The number of public restrooms that have both Western and squat types of toilets is increasing. Many train stations in the Tokyo area and public schools throughout Japan, for example, only have squat toilets. In addition, parks, temples, traditional Japanese restaurants, and older buildings typically only have squat toilets. Western-style toilets are usually indicated by the kanji characters 洋式 (yōshiki), the English words "Western-style", a symbol for the type of toilet, or any combination of the three. Handicapped bathrooms are always Western style.

Many public toilets do not have soap for washing hands, or towels for drying hands. Many people carry a handkerchief with them for such occasions, and some even carry soap. Some public toilets are fitted with powerful hand dryers to reduce the volume of waste generated from paper towels. Hand dryers and taps are sometimes installed with motion-sensors as an additional resource-saving measure.

In a project launched by the Nippon Foundation, 16 well-known architects were asked to renovate 17 public toilets located in the public parks of Shibuya, Tokyo. Shigeru Ban designed restrooms that are surrounded by transparent tinted glass, which allows a person to evaluate the interior before entering. In August 2020, these restrooms were installed in Haru-no-Ogawa Community Park and the Yoyogi Fukamachi Mini Park.

== Cultural aspects ==
In the often-crowded living conditions of Japanese cities and with the lack of rooms that can be locked from inside in a traditional Japanese house, the toilet is one of the few rooms in the house that allows for a degree of privacy. Some toilet rooms are equipped with a bookshelf, in others people may enter with a newspaper, and some are even filled with character goods and posters. Even so, these toilets are whenever possible, in rooms separate from those for bathing. This is due to a concern about separating clean from unclean, and this attribute is a selling point in properties for rent.

Both the traditional squat toilet and the high-tech toilet are a source of confusion for foreigners unaccustomed to these devices. There are humorous reports of individuals using a toilet, and randomly pressing buttons on the control panel either out of curiosity or in search for the flushing control, and suddenly to their horror receiving an unexpected jet of water directed at the genitals or anus. As the water jet continues for a few seconds after the novice jumps up, he also gets himself or the bathroom wet. Many Japanese toilets now feature pressure-sensitive seats that automatically shut off the bidet when the user stands up. Many have the buttons labeled in English to reduce culture shock.

In January 2017, the Japan Sanitary Equipment Industry Association agreed to standardize the iconography used on control panels of Japanese toilets, in an attempt to reduce confusion for foreign visitors.

== Environmental aspects ==
The environmental impact of modern style washlets differs from regular flush toilets. Modern toilets use less water than old toilets, and the self-cleaning options also reduce the amount of detergent. Some toilets even change the amount of water for the flush depending if the seat was flipped up (indicating male urination) or not. They also cause less toilet paper to be used. On the other hand, these toilets also consume energy, and are estimated to consume 5% of the energy of the average Japanese household. In rural areas, toilets that use very little or no water have also been designed. These are also considered as emergency toilets in case of earthquakes.

=== Toilet sinks ===
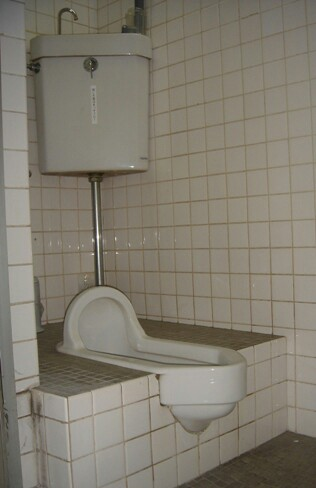
A squat toilet with sink attached to the water tank. This older toilet also uses waste water from an air conditioner to reduce municipal water use.

Many toilets in Japan with a water tank include a built-in sink. This is a simple water-saving grey water system: clean municipal water is used to wash the hands, then the waste water from hand washing is used to fill the tank for flushing. It also is a space saving feature in small, older bathrooms.

== Market acceptance ==
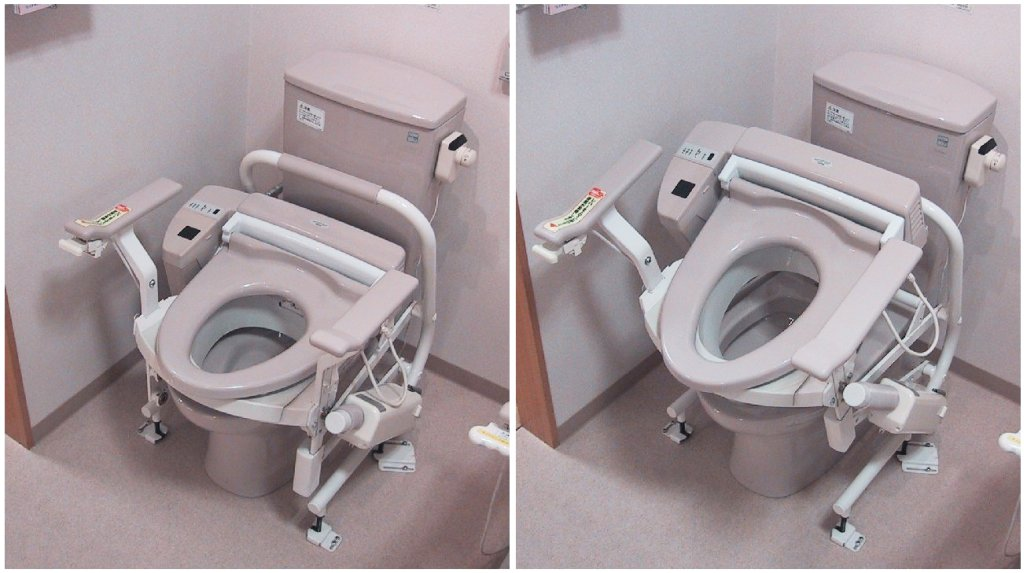
Electrically raised toilet seat for the elderly

Washlets in Japan cost from US$200, with the majority priced around US$500 for washlet upgrades for existing Western-style toilets. Top-of-the-range washlets, including the ceramic bowl, can cost up to US$5,000.

Toto Ltd. is the largest producer of toilets, including washlets, worldwide. Washlets and other toilet related products are also produced by Inax, and Panasonic.

The total market worldwide for high-tech toilets was about US$800 million in 1997. The largest producer in this category is Toto, with 65% of the market share, while the second largest is Inax at 25%. The main market for washlets is still in Japan, and Toto reports that overseas sales account for just 5% of its revenue. The primary foreign market is China, where Toto sells over one million washlets each year. In the US for example, sales are well below Japanese levels, even though sales improved from 600 units per month in 2001 to 1,000 units per month in 2003. In Europe, Toto sells only 5,000 washlets annually.

There are several reasons for low sales outside of Japan. One main reason is that it takes time for customers to get used to the idea of a washlet. Sales in Japan were slow when the device was introduced in 1980. After some acclimatization, sales improved significantly starting in 1985. Around 1990, 10% of Japanese households had a washlet; this number increased to over 50% in 2002. Toto expects a corresponding improvement in foreign sales within a few years.

Another factor is the lack of a power supply near the toilet. While virtually all Japanese washrooms have an electric outlet behind the toilet, many foreign bathrooms lack a nearby outlet. In Australia, New Zealand, Ireland, the UK, and many other countries, high current electrical outlets installed in close proximity to water, or where persons may be wet, are prohibited by codes due to possible health and safety concerns.

Lastly, the outlet of the toilet (for S-type toilets) is a maximum 10–15 centimetres (3.9–5.9 in) from the back wall, but Japanese toilets need it to be at least 30 centimetres (12 in) so an S-type European toilet cannot be replaced easily with a Japanese toilet. They are much more expensive than traditional Western toilets. In Europe, there is competition with the traditional Western bidet, while North Americans are unaccustomed to bidets.

== History ==
During the Jōmon period (1400 BC to 300 BC) settlements were built in a horseshoe shape, with a central plaza in the middle and garbage heaps around the settlement. In these garbage heaps, calcified fecal remains of humans or dogs, so called coprolites, were found, indicating that these garbage dumps were also used as toilets.

The earliest sewer systems are from the Yayoi period (300 BC to 250 AD). These systems were used in larger settlements, probably in combination with toilets.

A possible ritual site, that may also have been a toilet using flowing water, dating back to the early 3rd century was found in Sakurai, Nara. Another cesspit analyzed by archaeologists in detail was found at the site of the Fujiwara Palace in Kashihara, Nara, the first location of the imperial city from 694 to 710. This toilet was constructed over an open pit similar to an outhouse.

During the Nara period (710 to 784), a drainage system was created in the capital in Nara, consisting of 10–15 cm wide streams where the user could squat over with one foot on each side of the stream. Wooden sticks called chūgi were used as a sort of toilet paper. In earlier days seaweed was used for cleaning, but by the Edo period, these had been replaced by toilet paper made of washi (traditional Japanese paper). In the mountainous regions, wooden scrapers and large leaves were used too.

Often, toilets were constructed over a running stream; one of the first known flushing toilets was found at Akita castle, dating back to the 8th century, with the toilet constructed over a diverted stream.

However, historically, pit toilets were more common, as they were easier to build and allowed the reuse of the feces as fertilizer—very important in a country where Buddhism and its associated mostly vegetarian, pescetarian lifestyle acted to reduce dependence on livestock for food. The waste products of rich people were sold at higher prices because their diet was better.

Various historic documents dating from the 9th century describe laws regarding the construction of fresh and waste water channels, and detail the disposal procedures for toilet waste.

Prisoners shall be directed to clean up sewage at the Palace and government offices as well as toilets of the east and west on the morning after a rainy night

— Collected Interpretations of the Administrative Laws Ryo-no-shuge

Selling human waste products as fertilizers became much less common after World War II, both for sanitary reasons and because of the proliferation of chemical fertilizers, and less than 1% is now used for fertilization. Because of this history, Japan had a much higher historical standard of hygiene. For example, in Japan, the orderly disposal of human waste was a common component of the culture. The first Westerner to visit Edo expressed his shock to see such a clean city.

In Okinawa, the toilet was often attached to the pig pen, and the pigs were fed with the human waste product. This practice was banned as unhygienic after World War II by the American authorities.

During the Azuchi–Momoyama period (1568 to 1600), the "Taiko Sewerage" was built around Osaka Castle, and it still exists and functions today. The use of modern sewage systems began in 1884, with the installation of the first brick and ceramic sewer in Kanda, Tokyo. More plumbing and sewage systems were installed after the Great Kantō earthquake to avoid diseases after future earthquakes. However, the construction of sewers increased only after World War II to cope with the waste products of the growing population centers. By the year 2000, 60% of the population was connected to a sewer system. The national Sewage Day is September 10.

Western-style toilets and urinals started to appear in Japan at the beginning of the 20th century, but only after World War II did their use become more widespread, due to the influence of the American occupation. The Occupation government eschewed the use of human excreta as fertilizer, which led to a sense of shame over this practice, and in rural areas where the practice had persisted, human waste quickly went from being recycled to being disposed of. Specific places where night soil continued to be recycled required conscious political leadership, such as the Shinkyō Commune in Nara Prefecture.

In 1977, the sale of Western-style toilets exceeded the sale of traditional squat toilets in Japan. Based on toilets with a built-in bidet from Switzerland and the US, the world's largest sanitary equipment company, Toto, introduced the Washlet in 1980. Japanese companies currently produce some of the most advanced, highest tech toilets in the world.

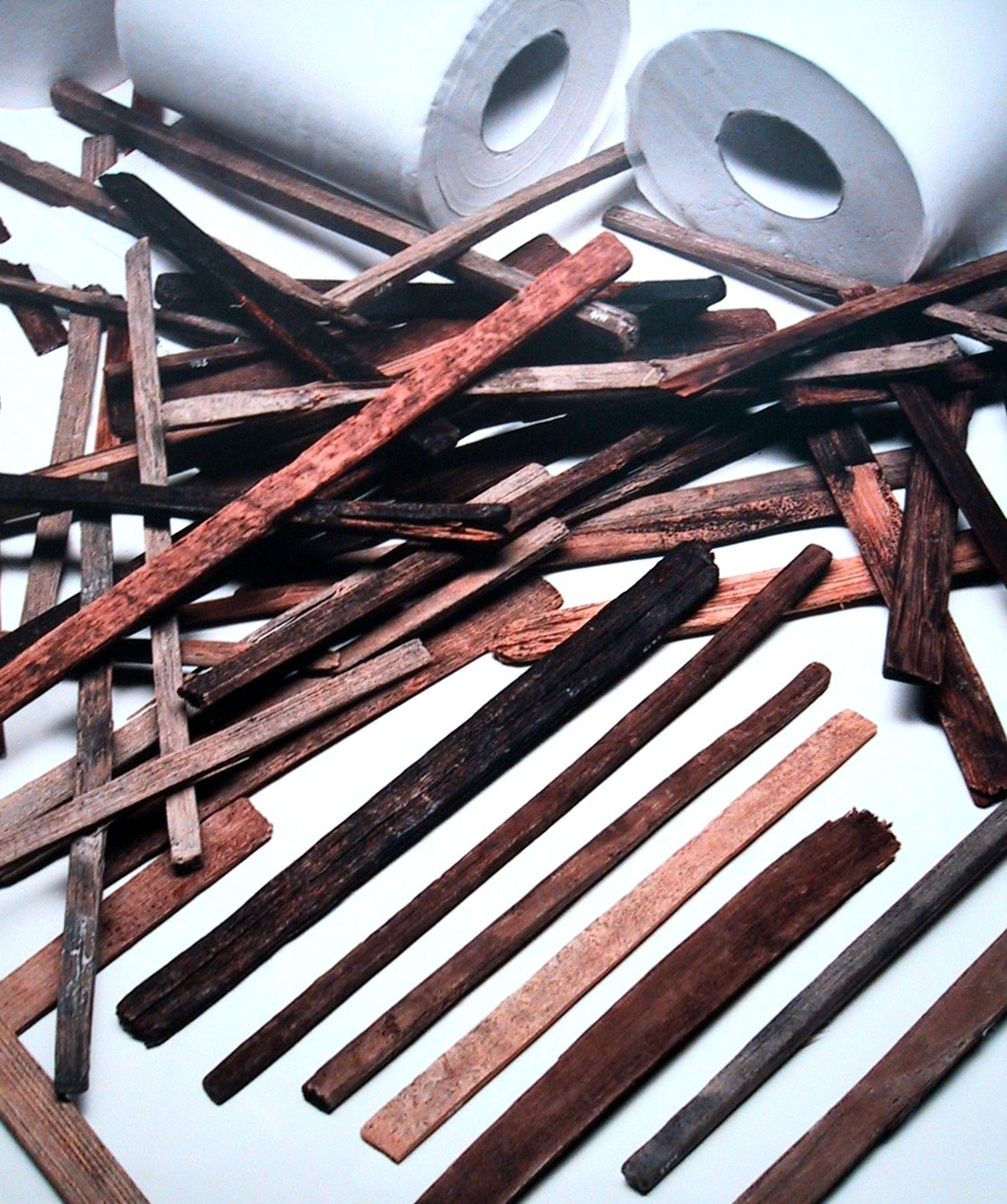
Nara period wooden scrapers called chūgi with modern toilet paper rolls in the background for size comparison

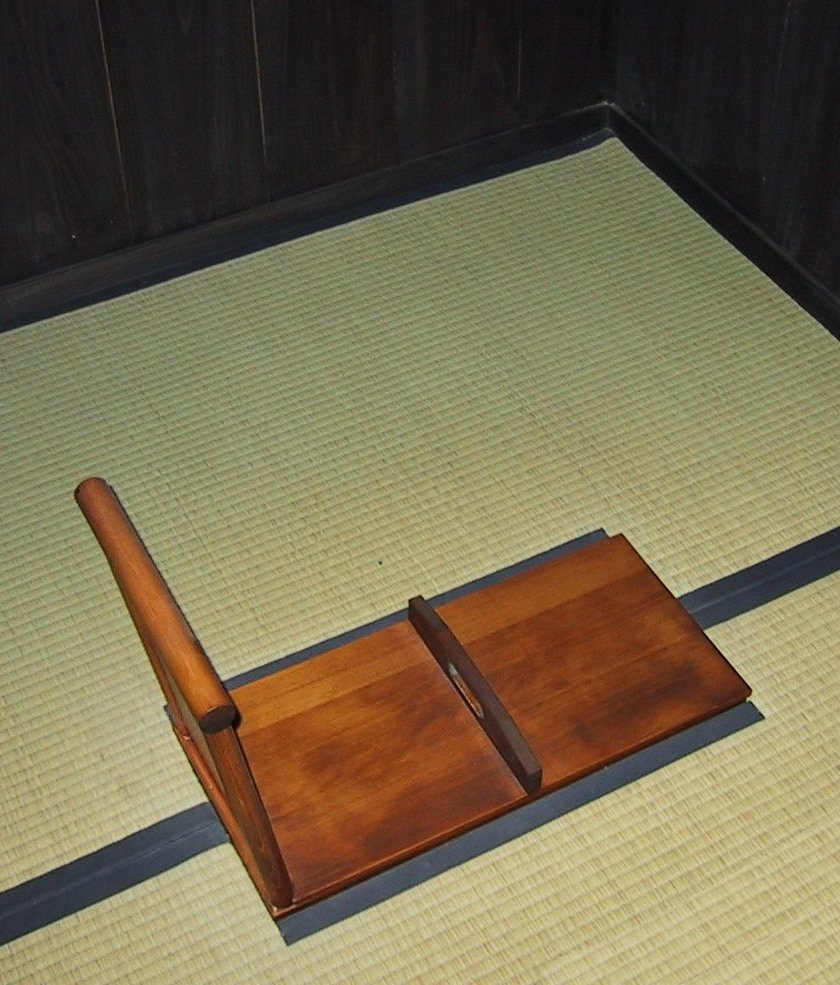
Wooden lid covering the Meiji Era squat toilet of a wealthy Japanese near Nakatsugawa

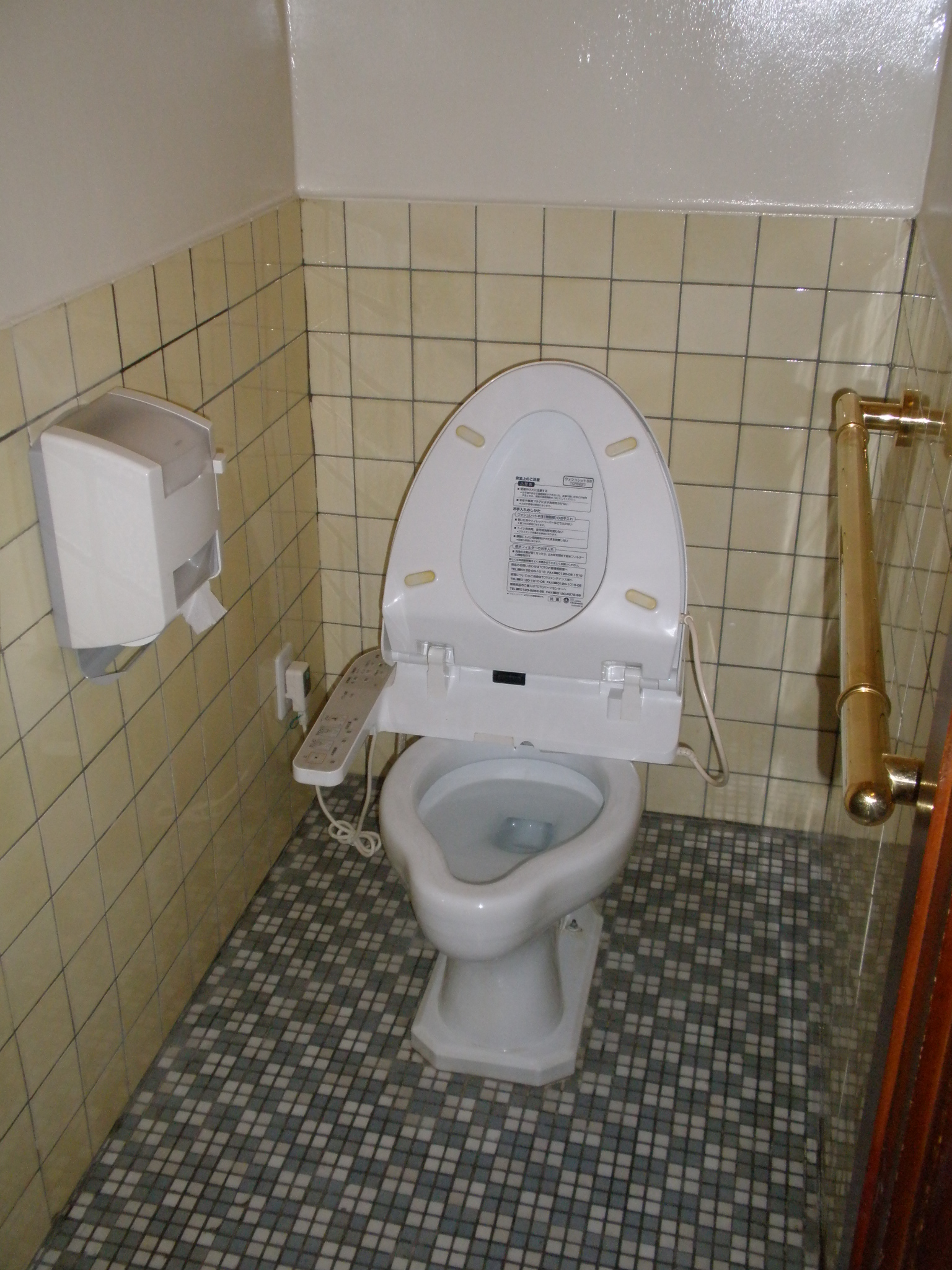
Toilet-bowl from the 1930s, with electronic lid fitted later

== See also ==
- Electronic bidet
- Mariko Aoki phenomenon, the urge to defecate while visiting a bookstore
- Science and technology in Japan
- Toilet meal
- TOTO Drake II
- TOTO Neorest 600
- Washlet
