= Toilet seat =

Hinged attachment to toilet bowl, round and open

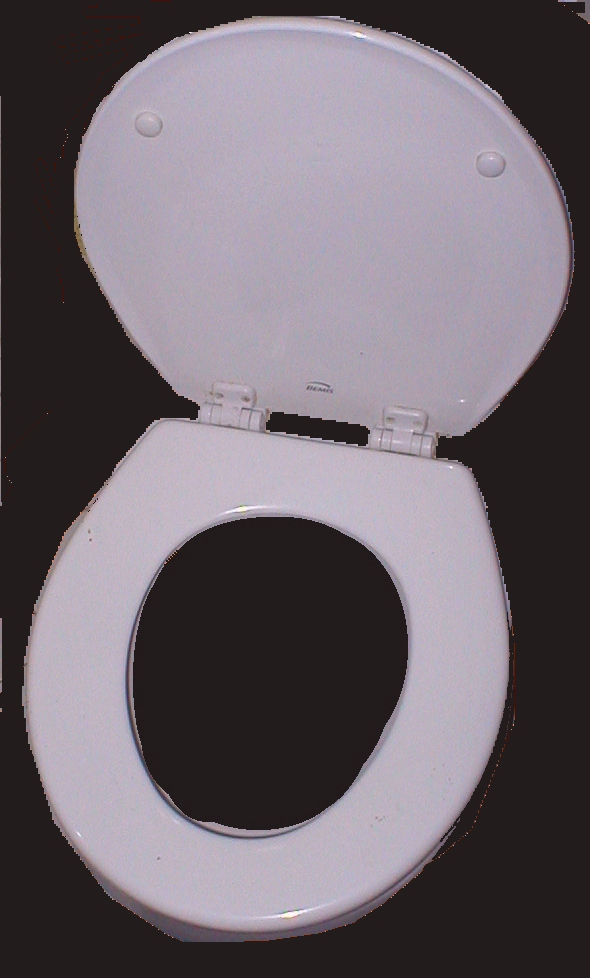
A Bemis Manufacturing Company seat and lid for a flush toilet

A toilet seat is a hinged unit consisting of a round or oval open seat, and usually a lid, which is bolted onto the bowl of a toilet used in a sitting position (as opposed to a squat toilet). The seat can be either for a flush toilet or a dry toilet. A toilet seat consists of the seat itself, which may be contoured for the user to sit on, and the lid, which covers the toilet when it is not in use – the lid may be absent in some cases, particularly in public restrooms.

== Usage ==
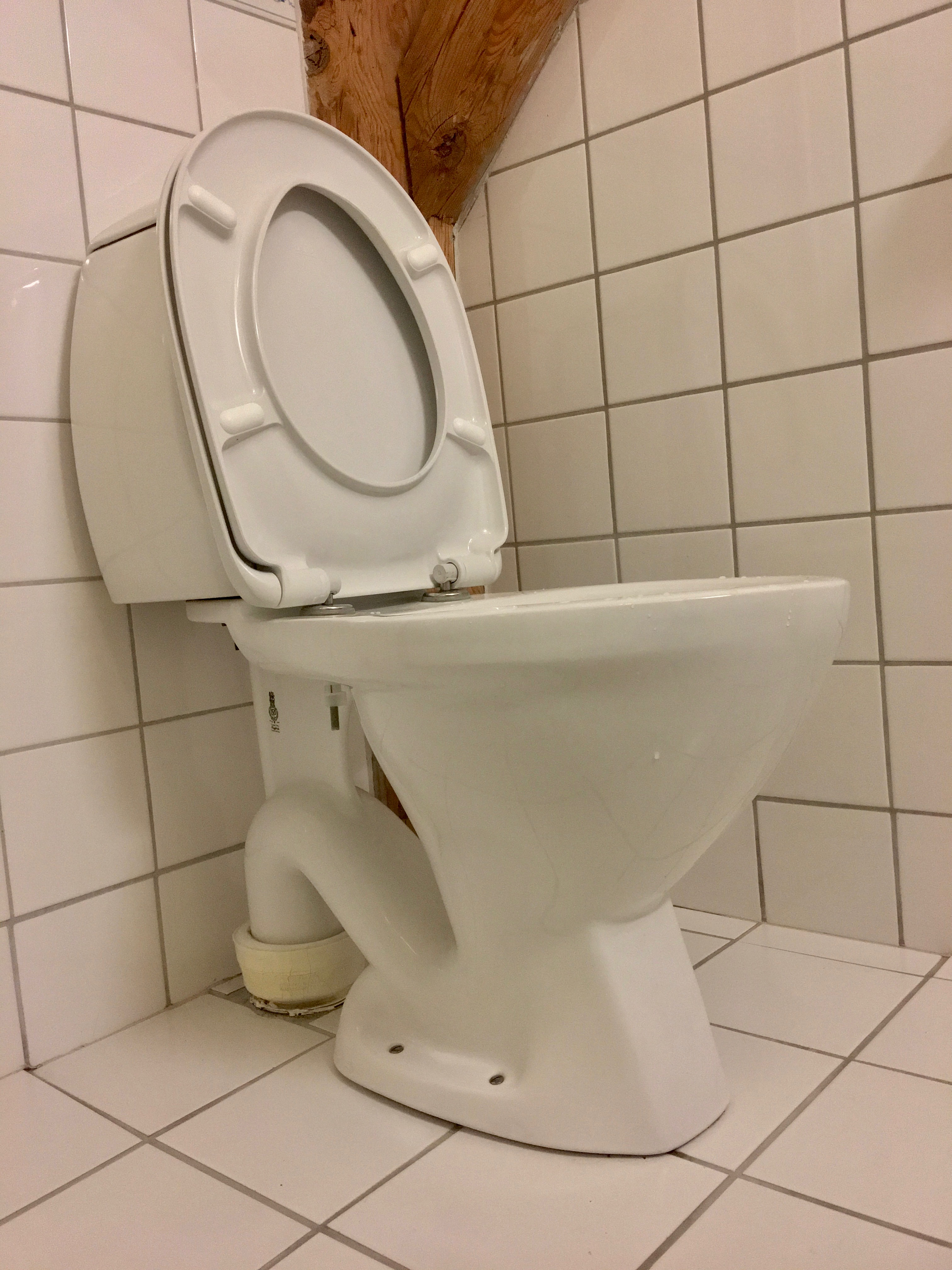
A toilet seat in the upright position

Toilet seats often have a lid. This lid is frequently left open. The combined toilet seat and lid may be kept in a closed position when a toilet is not in use, making it so that—at a minimum—the lid must be raised before use. It can be closed to prevent small items from falling in, reduce odors, or provide a chair in the toilet room for aesthetic purposes. Some studies show that closing the lid prevents the spread of aerosols on flushing ("toilet plume"), which might be a source of disease transmission.

Depending on the sex of the user and the type of use (urination or defecation), the seat itself may be left either up or down. The issue of whether the seat and lid should be placed in the closed position after use is a perennial topic of discussion and light humor (usually across gender lines), with it often being argued that leaving the toilet seat up is more efficient for men, while putting it down is more considerate for women. The "right answer" seems to depend on factors ranging from the location of the toilet (public or private), the population of the users (e.g., a sorority house vs a frat house), and/or personal or family values, opinions, preferences, agreements, or toiletry habits.

Toilet seats often rest not directly on the porcelain or metal body of the toilet itself, but upon the hinges and upon tabs/spacers affixed at a few spots. Similarly, lids do not rest directly in uniform contact with the seat but are elevated above it by the hinges and tabs/spacers affixed at a few spots. This is a possible area where effluent aerosols can be spread when shut.

== Variations ==
Toilet seats are manufactured in a range of different styles and colors, and they may be furnished to match the style of the toilet itself. They are usually built to fit the shape of the toilet bowl: two examples of this are the elongated bowl and the regular bowl. Some toilet seats are equipped with slow-closing hinges to reduce noise by preventing them from slamming against the bowl.

Some seats are made of various types of wooden materials, like oak or walnut, and others are made of soft materials for added comfort. Seats with printed multi-colored designs, such as floral or newsprint, have been fashionable at times. Other designs are made of transparent plastic, encapsulating small decorative items such as seashells or coins. The price of toilet seats varies quite considerably.

Decorative textile covers for the toilet seat lid have gone in and out of fashion. Advocates claim that they allow the toilet to be used as a more comfortable seat and provide another way of decorating a bathroom. At the same time, critics view them as a sanitation problem that creates unnecessary work.

Some metal toilets, such as those in many jails and prisons, have built-in toilet seats that cannot be removed, so that an inmate cannot fashion it into a weapon, shield, or escape tool.

=== Open front toilet seats ===
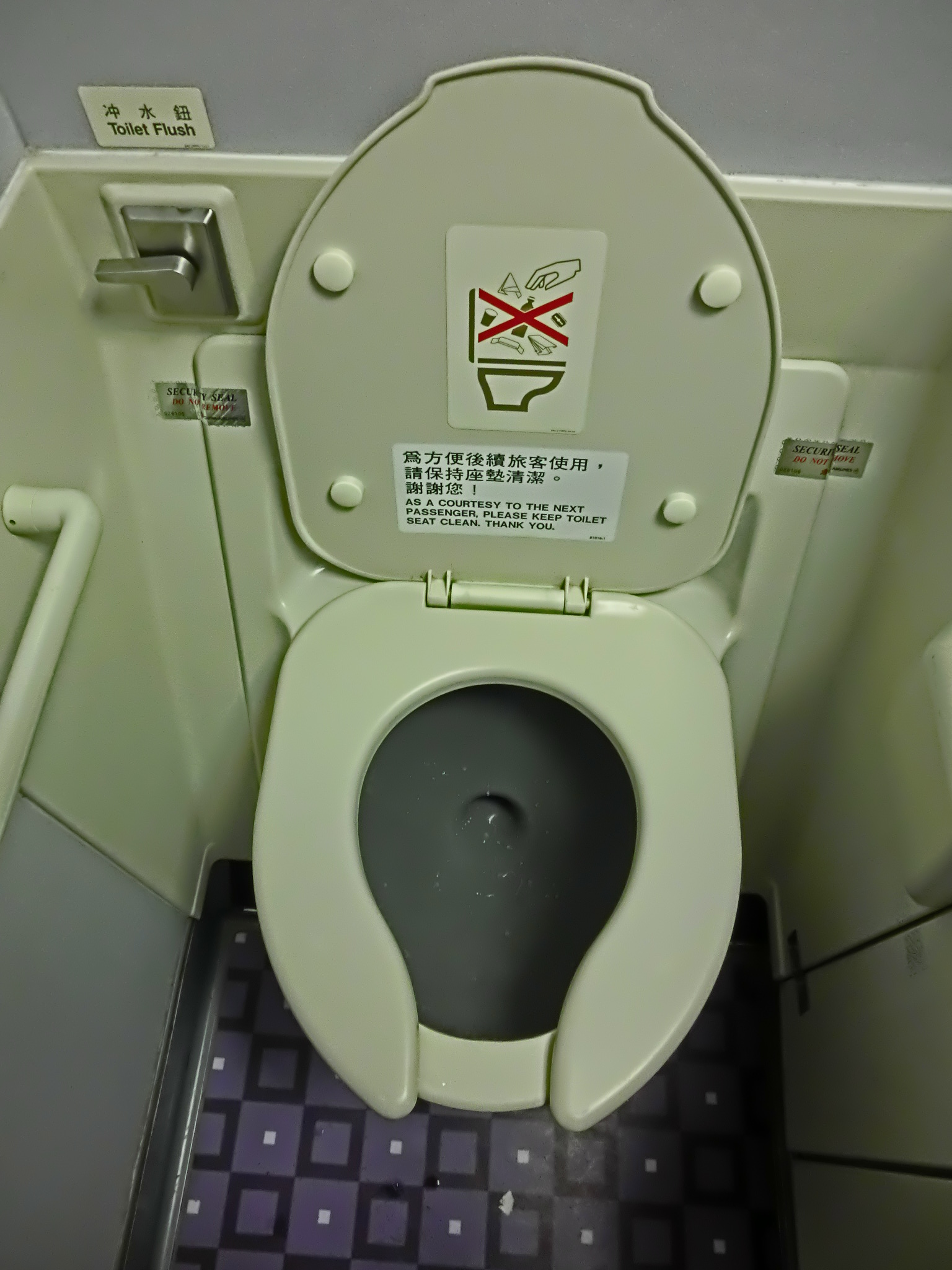
An open front airplane toilet seat, with notices instructing users not to flush rubbish down the toilet, and to keep the toilet seat clean for the following user

The International Association of Plumbing and Mechanical Officials' Uniform Plumbing Code, section 409.2.2, requires that "all water closet seats, except those within dwelling units or for private use, shall be of the open front type". There is an exception for toilets with an automatic toilet-seat cover dispenser. Most public authorities follow the code, so many public toilets feature open front toilet seats (also called "split seats").

The purpose of this seat design is to prevent the genitals from contacting the seat. It also omits an area of the seat that could be contaminated with urine and avoids contact for easier wiping.

=== Modern design, electronic integration, and function ===
==== Slow-close ====
A slow-close seat uses special hinges to prevent the seat from slamming down. Special hinges provide resistance, allowing the seat to lower slowly.

==== Warming ====
High-tech toilet seats may include many features, including a heated seat, a bidet, and a blow dryer. High-tech seats are most common in Japan, where a seat with integrated bidets is colloquially called a Washlet, after a leading brand. Electrically heated toilet seats have been popular in Japan since the 1970s. Since Japanese bathrooms are often unheated, the toilet seat sometimes doubles as a space heater. Integrated bidets date from around 1980, and have since become very popular in Japan, and are becoming more common in most other developed countries.

Water-heated seats were in use in royal homes in Britain in the twentieth century. The first electrically heated toilet seat was manufactured by Cyril Reginald Clayton at St Leonard's on Sea in Sussex. A UK patent was applied for on 5 January 1959, filed on 4 January 1960, and granted in August 1963 (UK patent no. 934209). The first model, the 'Deluxete', was made of fiberglass with a heating element in the lid triggered by a mercury switch that warmed the seat when the lid was down. Subsequent improvements were made, and another UK patent was applied for, this time for a deodorizing model with an integral fan on 20 May 1970. It was granted on 17 May 1972 (UK patent no. 1260402). At first marketed as the 'Deodar', this model was later sold as the 'Readywarm'. Among the early users of the 'Deluxete' was racing driver Stirling Moss. With the permission of Reginald Clayton, the electrically heated seat was further developed by the Japanese firm Matsushita. In 1993, Matt DiRoberto of Worcester, Massachusetts invented the padded toilet seat, an early 1990s fad.

=== Seatless toilet ===
A seatless toilet has no toilet seat. It may be much cleaner and easier to clean than toilet seats, while the structurally sound and hard rim of a porcelain toilet bowl still allows sitting. Users not aware of the possibility to sit on this type of toilet may hover over.

== Disposable covers ==
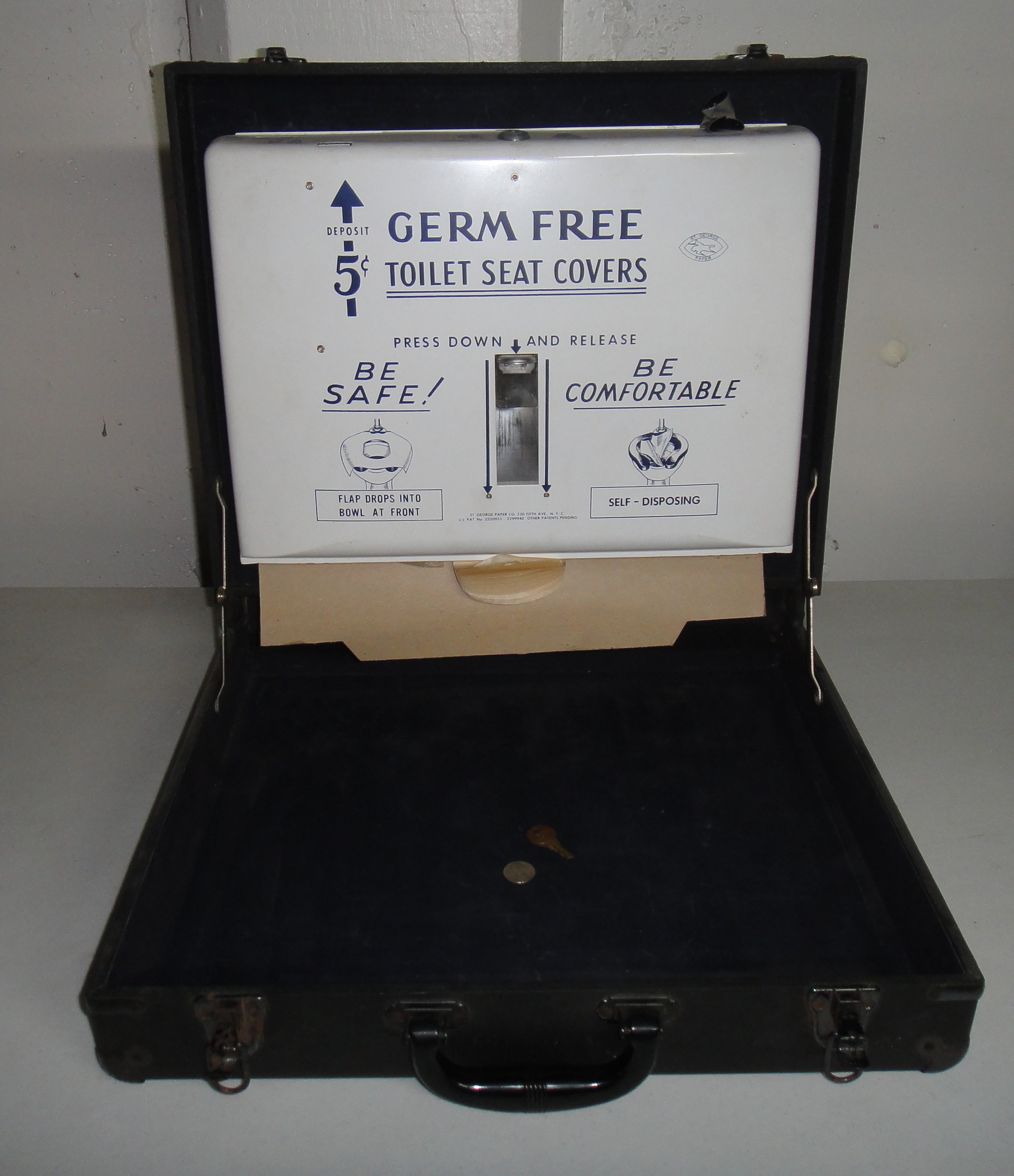
Salesman's case with an original 1943 Thomasa Seat Cover Dispenser

A disposable piece of paper, shaped like the toilet seat itself and known as a disposable toilet seat cover or toilet sheet, can be placed on the seat. Its purpose is to make the toilet user feel more reassured that they are protected from germs. The first known patented model of the toilet seat cover dispenser dates back to 1942 and was invented by J.C. Thomasa.

While toilet seat covers give public toilet users a sense of cleanliness, studies have shown they are not needed as there are few germs on a toilet seat, and infections such as Salmonella are spread via the hands, not the buttocks.

== Society and culture ==
=== Humor ===
The toilet seat functions as a comic standby for sight gags relating to toilet humor. The most common is someone staggering out of a toilet room after an explosion with a toilet seat around his neck. In the television show Dead Like Me, George Lass, the main character, is killed when a zero-G toilet seat from space station Mir re-enters the atmosphere.

=== US Navy's "$600 Toilet Seat" ===
The P-3C Orion antisubmarine aircraft went into service in 1962. Twenty-five years later, in 1987, it was determined that the toilet shroud, the cover that fits over the toilet, needed replacement. Since the airplane was out of production, this would require new tooling to produce. These on-board toilets required a uniquely shaped, molded fiberglass shroud that had to satisfy specifications for vibration resistance, weight, and durability. The molds had to be specially made, as it had been decades since their original production. The price reflected the design work and the cost of the equipment to manufacture them. Lockheed Corporation charged $34,560 for 54 toilet covers, or $640 each.

President Ronald Reagan held a televised news conference in 1987, where he held up one of these shrouds and stated: "We didn't buy any $600 toilet seat. We bought a $600 molded plastic cover for the entire toilet system." A Pentagon spokesman, Glenn Flood, stated, "The original price we were charged was $640, not just for a toilet seat, but for the large molded plastic assembly covering the entire seat, tank, and full toilet assembly. The seat itself cost $9 and some cents.... The supplier charged too much, and we had the amount corrected." The president of Lockheed at the time, Lawrence Kitchen, adjusted the price to $100 each and returned $29,165. "This action is intended to put to rest an artificial issue," Kitchen stated.

== See also ==
- Bidet
- Toilet seat riser
