= Washlet =

Toilet by the Japanese company Toto

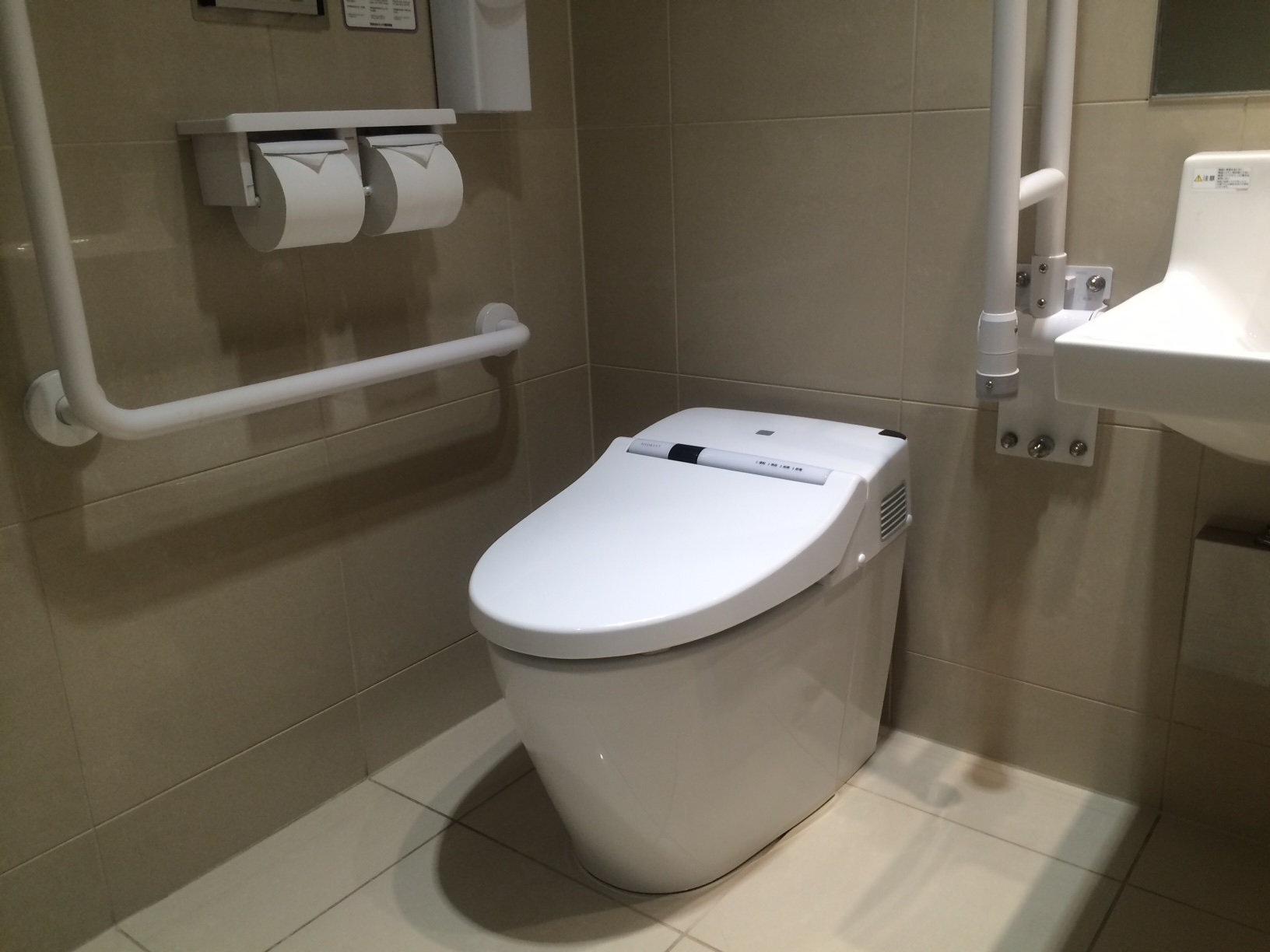
A typical washlet in Japan

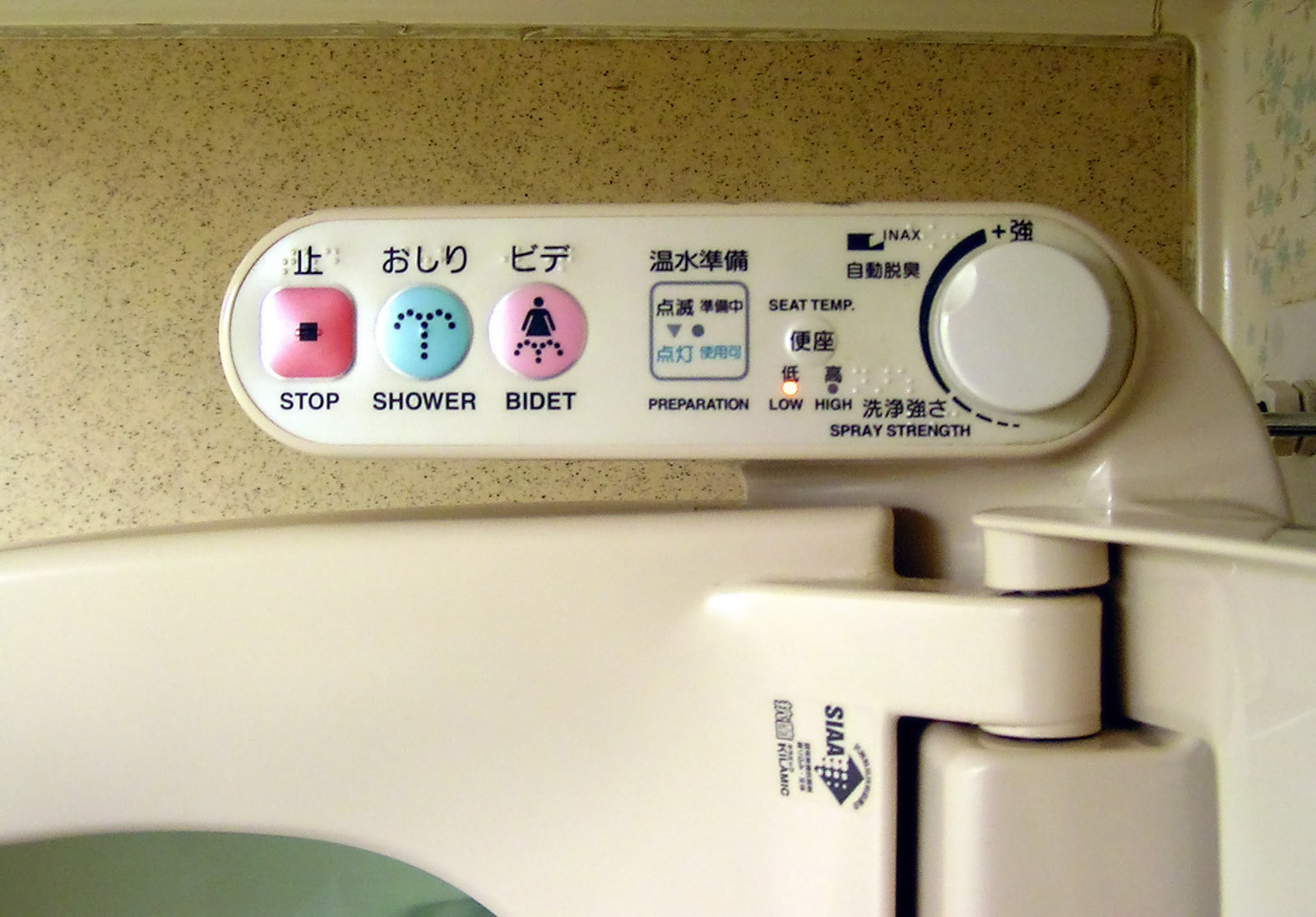
Control panel of a modern Japanese washlet with bilingual text

Washlet in action in Tokyo

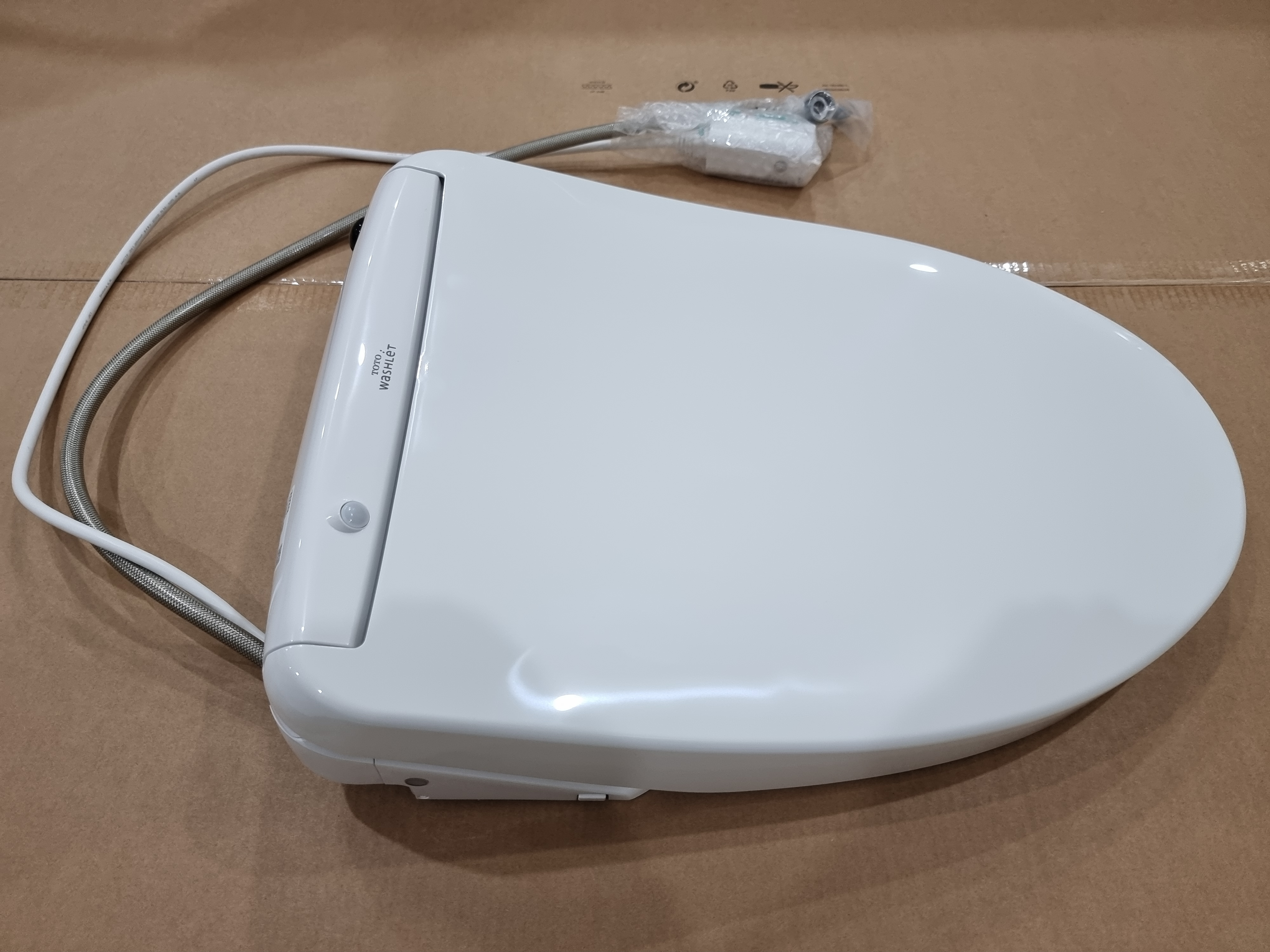
A yet-to-be-installed Washlet, TCF8WW88 model

Washlet (Japanese: ウォシュレット, Hepburn: Woshuretto) is a Japanese line of cleansing toilet seats manufactured and sold by the company Toto. The electronic bidet features a water spray element for genital and anal cleansing and is common in Japan and has become more popular in other parts of the world. The device was released in June 1980 and as of 2025, Toto has sold more than 70 million units.

== History ==
In the 1960s, Japanese plumbing company Toto's goal was to import American "wash air seats" for domestic sales, mainly for sale to hospitals and nursing homes. Toto began domestic production in 1969.

In 1980, Toto began to sell its improved Washlets in Japan after surveying employees to determine appropriate spray positions, since there were no biometric statistics available.

In the 1980s, the term "Washlet" originated by the company Toto. Recognized for its pioneering role in 2012, the original Washlet G model was certified as item 55 of Mechanical Engineering Heritage.

== Design ==
In 1996, Toto also released Washlets designed for Japanese-style squat toilets, but they proved difficult to use due to accuracy issues. Japanese-style toilets were replaced with their Western-style counterparts, and the model was discontinued around 2003.

In October 2005, Toto released other improvements, incorporating sleep mode for energy conservation, a remote control, and a Washlet that could play MP3 audio files. Upon her visit to Japan in 2005, pop singer Madonna commented that she had "missed Japan’s warm toilet seats."

== Functions ==
The cleansing features include buttons labeled Oshiri ("Rear") and Bidet ("Front") with translations in English speaking regions. Most current models have a sensor preventing water from spraying while a person is not sitting on the toilet.

For antibacterial and disinfectant purposes, the nozzle is designed at such an angle that the water does not splash back on the inside of the toilet (43° for anuses, 53° for vulvas), and the nozzle itself is washed with warm water when stowed away and before use. Anal and genital cleansing functions operate on different nozzles. Some models feature deodorizers and dryers for the user's convenience.

The control panels usually feature settings to change the intensity of the water spray, as well as temperature.

== See also ==
- Electronic bidet
- Toilets in Japan
