= Sanitation in ancient Rome =

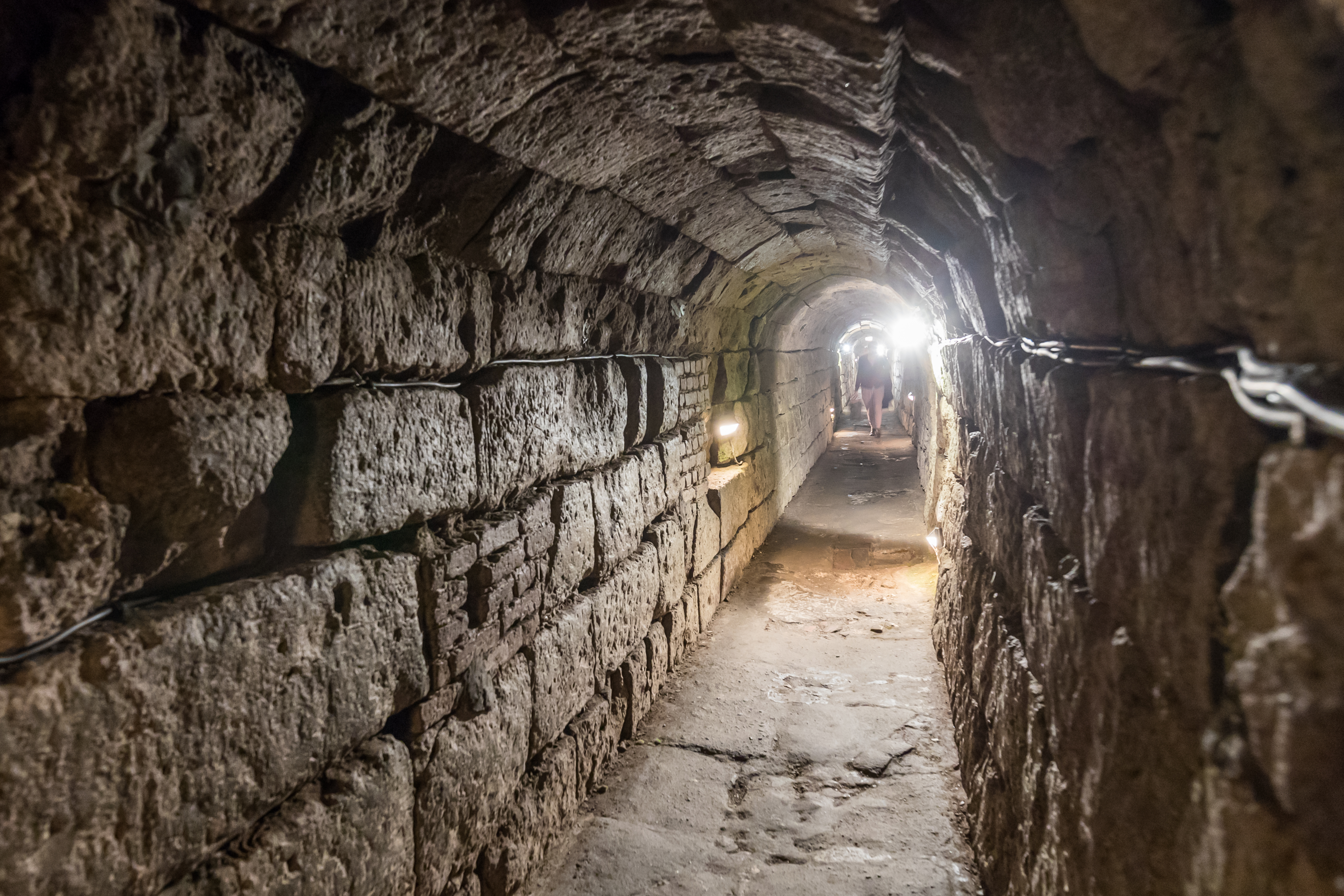
A preserved tunnel of the Roman sewer system of Colonia Claudia Ara Agrippinensium (present-day Cologne, Germany)

Sanitation in ancient Rome, acquired from the Etruscans, was very advanced compared to other ancient cities and provided water supply and sanitation services to residents of Rome. Although there were many sewers, public latrines, baths and other sanitation infrastructure, disease was still rampant. The baths are known to symbolise the "great hygiene of Rome".

== Infrastructure ==
=== Sewer systems ===
==== History ====
It is estimated that the first sewers of ancient Rome were built around 500 BCE by the Romans, in imitation of the Etruscans. These early drainage systems were underground channels made to drain rainwater as it might wash away topsoil. Also, ditches were used to drain swamps such as the Pontine Marshes and subterranean channels were used to drain marshy channels. Drainage systems evolved slowly and began primarily as a means to drain marshes and storm runoff. The sewers were mainly for the removal of surface drainage and underground water. The sewage system as a whole did not dramatically improve until the arrival of the Cloaca Maxima, an open channel that was later covered, and one of the best-known sanitation artifacts of the ancient world. Most sources believe it was built during the reign of the three Etruscan kings in the sixth century BCE. This "greatest sewer" of Rome was originally built to drain the low-lying land around the Forum. Some scholars believe that there is not sufficient evidence to accurately determine the effectiveness of the Cloaca Maxima. However other scholars believe that one million pounds of human feces and water was transported through the Cloaca Maxima.

Alongside the development of the Cloaca Maxima, other sewers were built. Many of them linked to each other. A law was eventually passed to protect innocent bystanders from assault by wastes thrown into the street. The violator was forced to pay damages to whomever his waste hit, if that person sustained an injury. This law was enforced only in the daytime, it is presumed, because one then lacked the excuse of darkness for injuring another by careless waste disposal. During Agrippa's time as Aedile in 33 BCE the Cloaca Maxima was largely reconstructed and renovated. Strabo, a Greek author who lived from about 60 BCE to 24 CE, admired the ingenuity of the Romans in his Geographica, writing:

The sewers, covered with a vault of tightly fitted stones, have room in some places for hay wagons to drive through them. And the quantity of water brought into the city by aqueducts is so great that rivers, as it were, flow through the city and the sewers; almost every house has water tanks, and service pipes, and plentiful streams of water...In short, the ancient Romans gave little thought to the beauty of Rome because they were occupied with other, greater and more necessary matters.

Around 100 CE, direct connections of homes to sewers began, and the Romans completed most of the sewer system infrastructure. Sewers were laid throughout the city, serving public and some private latrines, and also served as dumping grounds for homes not directly connected to a sewer. It was mostly the wealthy whose homes were connected to the sewers, through outlets that ran under an extension of the latrine.

==== Construction ====
The Romans had a complex system of sewers covered by stones, much like modern sewers. Waste flushed from the latrines flowed through a central channel into the main sewage system and thence into a nearby river or stream. However, it was not uncommon for Romans to throw waste out of windows into the streets (at least according to Roman satirists). Despite this, Roman waste management is admired for its innovation.

A system of eleven Roman aqueducts provided the inhabitants of Rome with water of varying quality, the best being reserved for potable supplies. Poorer-quality water was used in public baths and in latrines. Latrine systems have been found in many places, such as Housesteads, a Roman fort on Hadrian's Wall, in Pompeii, Herculaneum, and elsewhere that flushed waste away with a stream of water.

=== Public latrines ===
The latrines (public toilets) are the best-preserved feature at Housesteads Roman Fort on Hadrian's Wall. The soldiers sat on wooden boards with holes, which covered one big trench. Water ran in a big ditch at the soldiers' feet.

In general, poorer residents used pots that they were supposed to empty into the sewer, or visited public latrines. Public latrines date back to the 2nd century BCE. Whether intentionally or not, they became places to socialise. Long bench-like seats with keyhole-shaped openings cut in rows offered little privacy. Some latrines were free, for others small charges were made.

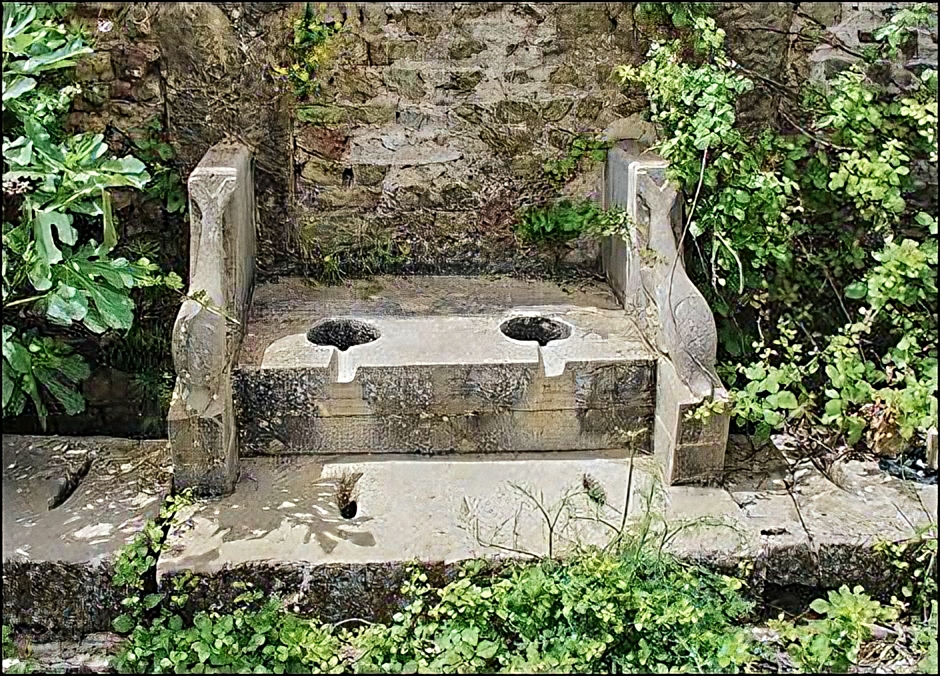
Double latrine at the Roman ruins of Timgad in Algeria.

According to Lord Amulree, the site where Julius Caesar was assassinated, the Hall of Curia in the Theatre of Pompey, was turned into a public latrine because of the dishonor it had witnessed. The sewer system, like a little stream or river, ran beneath it, carrying the waste away to the Cloaca Maxima.

The Romans recycled public bath waste water by using it as part of the flow that flushed the latrines. Terra cotta piping was used in the plumbing that carried waste water from homes. The Romans were the first to seal pipes in concrete to resist the high water pressures developed in siphons and elsewhere. Beginning around the 5th century BCE, aediles, among their other functions, supervised the sanitary systems. They were also responsible for the efficiency of the drainage and sewage systems, the cleansing of the streets, prevention of foul smells, and general oversight of baths.

In the first century CE, the Roman sewage system was very efficient. In his Natural History, Pliny remarked that of all the things Romans had accomplished, the sewers were "the most noteworthy things of all".

After defecating in the latrine, users would use a xylospongium (though newer research suggests it was a toilet brush) to wipe their butt.

=== Aqueducts ===
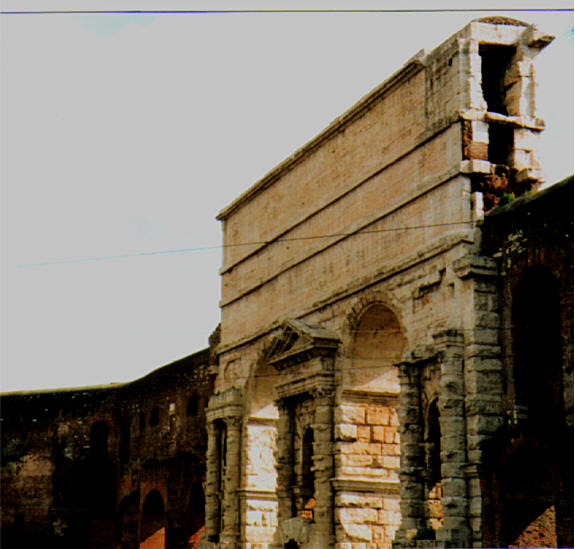
Remains of aqueducts Aqua Claudia and Anio Novus, integrated into the Aurelian Wall

The aqueducts provided the large volumes of water that—after serving drinking, bathing, and other needs—flushed through the sewers. A system of eleven aqueducts supplied the city with water from as far away as the Anio River. Anio Novus and Aqua Claudia were two of the biggest systems. The distribution system was carefully designed so that all waste water drained into the Cloaca Maxima.

The management and maintenance involved in keeping the aqueducts flowing is well described by Frontinus, a general appointed by the emperor Nerva as water commissioner toward the end of the first century CE. He described his work on the distribution system in De aquaeductu published at the end of the first century CE. When first appointed, he surveyed and mapped the entire system, and strove to investigate the many abuses of the water supply, such as the act of tapping into pipes illegally. He also systematized aqueduct maintenance with gangs of specially trained workmen. He also tried to separate the supply, so that the best-quality water went to drinking and cooking, while second-quality water flowed to the fountains, baths, and, finally, sewers.

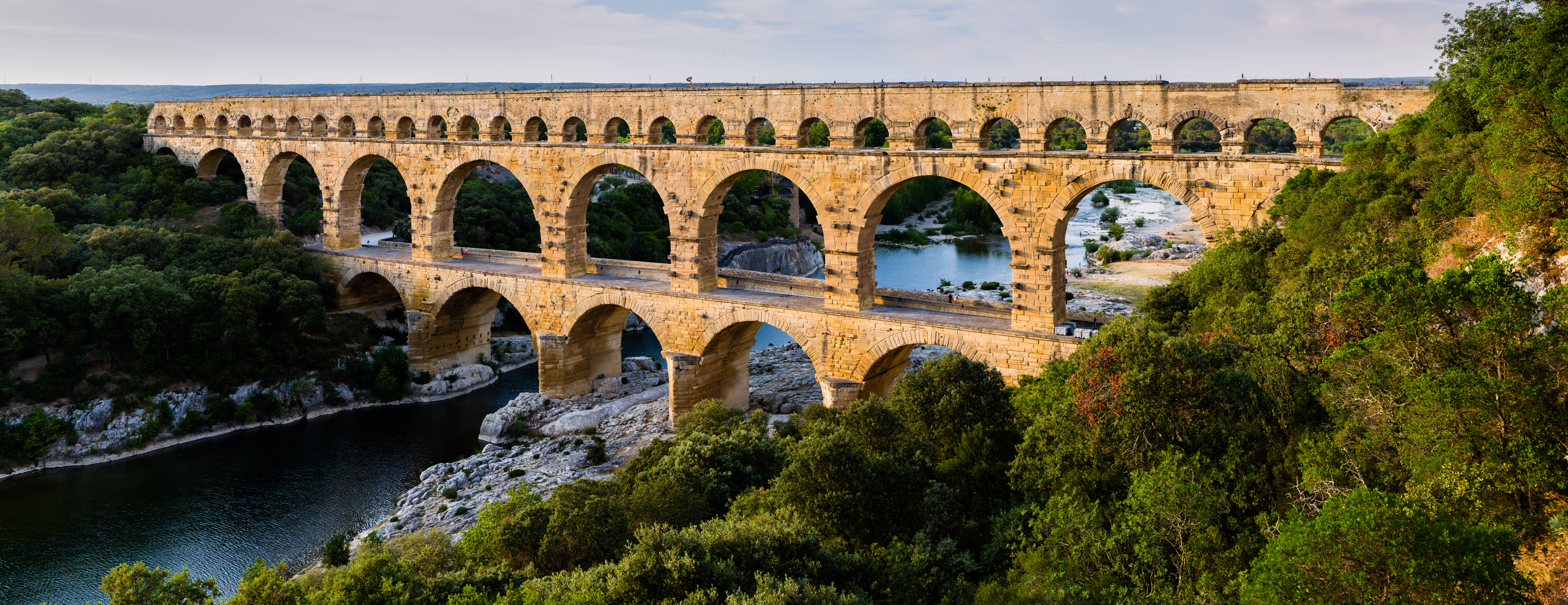
Pont du Gard in France

The system in Rome was copied in all provincial towns and cities of the Roman Empire, and even down to villas that could afford the plumbing. Roman citizens came to expect high standards of hygiene, and the army was also well provided with latrines and bath houses, or thermae. Aqueducts were used everywhere in the empire not just to supply drinking water for private houses but to supply other needs such as irrigation, public fountains, and thermae. Indeed, many of the provincial aqueducts survive in working order to the present day, although modernized and updated. Of the eleven ancient aqueducts serving Rome, eight of them entered Rome close to each other on the Esquiline Hill. Also, the first aqueduct was the Aqua Appia built in 312 BCE by the censor Appius. Other aqueducts of importance to Roman sanitation was the Aqua Marcia built between 144 and 140 BCE, which provided large amounts of quality water to Rome. One Aqueduct with some major importance to Rome was Traiana, which tapped from the clear springs of the northern and western slopes above lake Bracciano. It is said that the “Romans fully appreciated the importance of plentiful and wholesome supply of water, for domestic purposes to health of the Community. It was stated by Amulree that for 441 years after the building of Rome, it depended on water from the Tiber for drinking and other domestic purposes, but in 312 BCE Appius Claudius Crassus provide Rome with water from the Springs of the Alban hills and brought to consumers by the means of Aqueducts. The Amulree notes state that this practice is in line with the teachings of Hippocrates: that stagnant water should be refused, not the spring water from the hills or rain water.

Roman rubbish was often left to collect in alleys between buildings in the poor districts of the city. It sometimes became so thick that stepping stones were needed. "Unfortunately its functions did not include house-to-house garbage collection, and this led to indiscriminate refuse dumping, even to the heedless tossing of trash from windows." As a consequence, the street level in the city rose, as new buildings were constructed on top of rubble and rubbish.

== Health impacts ==
Although there were many sewers, public latrines, baths and other sanitation infrastructure, disease was still rampant. Most dwellings were not connected to street drains or sewers. Some apartment buildings (insulae) might have had a latrine and a fountain on the ground floor. This didn't stop the residents on the upper floors from dumping their waste onto the street. There was no street cleaning service in Rome. Thus, the neighborhoods were plagued with disease.

The baths are known to symbolise the "great hygiene of Rome". Doctors commonly prescribed their patients a bath. Consequently, the diseased and healthy sometimes bathed together. The sick generally preferred to visit the baths during the afternoon or night to avoid the healthy, but the baths were not constantly being cleaned. This means the healthy who bathe the next day might catch the disease from the sick who bathed the previous day.

Latrines could be found in many places such as in baths, forts and the colosseum. The Romans wiped themselves after defecating with a sea sponge on a stick named tersorium. This might be shared by all of those using the latrine, or people would bring their own sponge. To clean the sponge, they washed it in a bucket with water and salt or vinegar. This became a breeding ground for bacteria, causing the spread of disease in the latrine. It is commonly believed the Romans used sea sponges on a stick and dipped in vinegar after defecation (for anal hygiene), but the practice is only attested to once.

There was widespread presence of several helminth types (intestinal worms) that caused dysentery.

== Famous ancient Roman water supply and sewer systems ==
- Roman aqueduct, water supply
- Cloaca Maxima, ancient Roman sewer system
- Cloaca Circi Maximi, ancient Roman sewer system

== Ancient Roman technology ==
The Ancient Roman technology which impacted the water and sanitation system include:

- Ancient Roman architecture
- Ancient Roman engineering
  - Frontinus, ancient engineer

== See also ==
- History of water supply and sanitation
  - Ancient water conservation techniques
  - Water supply and sanitation in the Indus-Saraswati Valley Civilisation
  - History of stepwells in Gujarat
  - Traditional water sources of Persian antiquity
