= Sponge (tool) =

Cleaning tool made of porous material

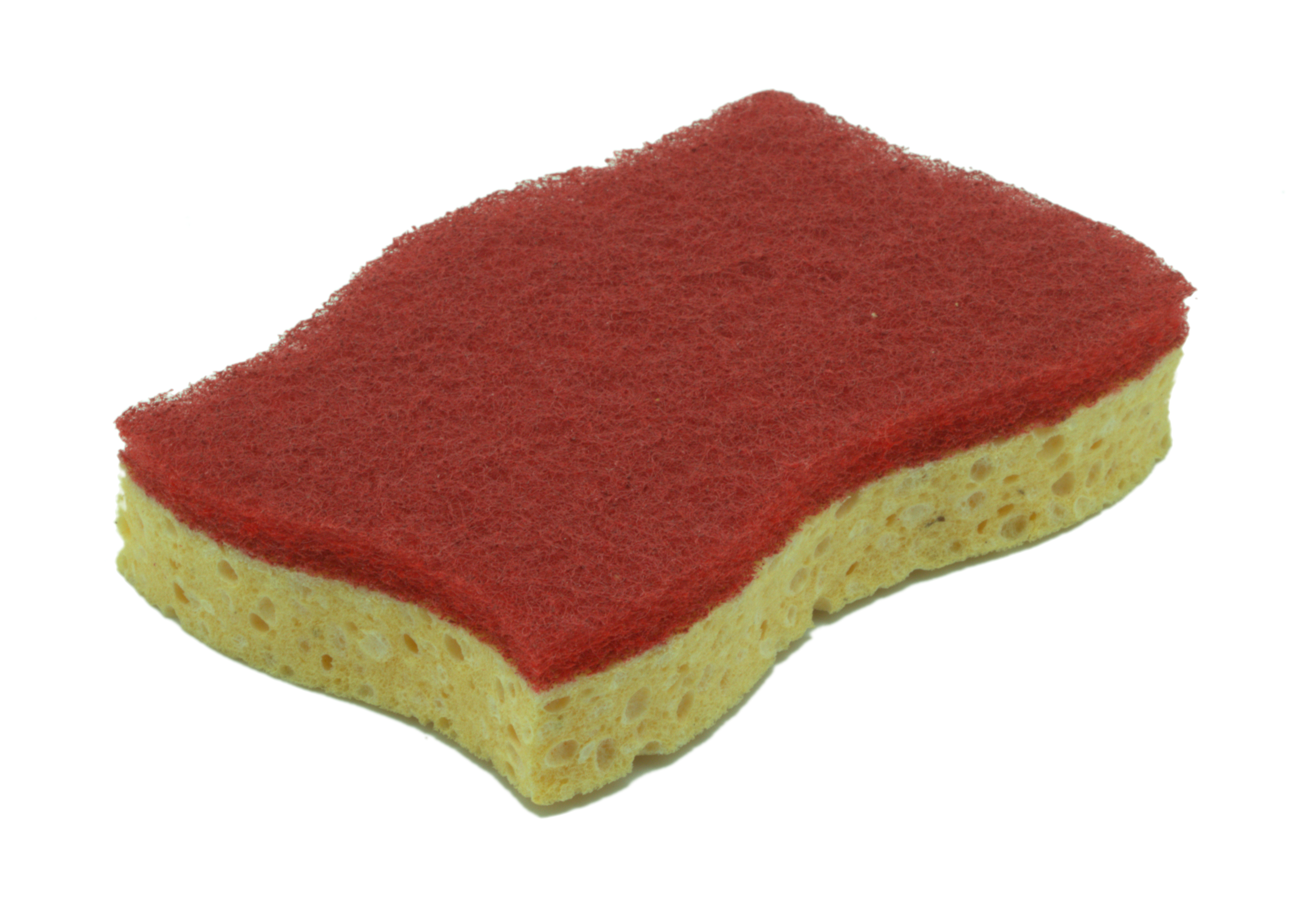
Vegetable fiber sponge: wood fiber sponge combined with scouring pad.

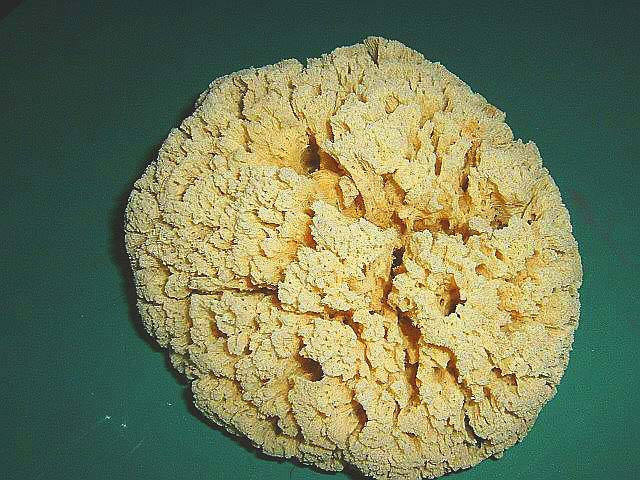
Animal fiber sponge: A Greek natural sponge.

A sponge (/ˈspʌndʒ/ SPUNJ) is a cleaning aid made of soft, porous material. Typically used for cleaning impervious surfaces, sponges are especially good at absorbing water and water-based solutions.

Originally made from natural sea sponges, they are most commonly made from synthetic materials today.

== Etymology ==
The word comes from the Ancient Greek term σπόγγος (spóngos).

== History ==
The first reference of sponges used for hygiene dates from Ancient Greece. Competitors of the Olympic Games bathed themselves with sea sponges soaked in olive oil or perfume before competing. In the book Odyssey by the Greek poet Homer, the god Hephaestus cleans his hands, face, and chest with a sea sponge, and the servants in the Odysseus palace used sea sponges to clean the tables after the meals the suitors of Penelope had there. The Greek philosophers Aristotle and Plato mentioned sea sponges in both scientific and historic contexts in their works. Ancient Romans used sea sponges extensively for hygiene. The belief that sponges had therapeutic properties led to their usage in medicine for cleaning wounds and treating disease. Ancient Greeks and Romans also used sea sponges tied to sticks for anal hygiene, a tool known as the xylospongium, and washed them with sea water.

In the New Testament, a Roman soldier offers Jesus Christ the Holy Sponge soaked in vinegar on the tip of his spear (some versions say staff) for Jesus to drink during his crucifixion.

Synthetic sponges were made possible to be manufactured only after the invention of polyester in the 1920s and the commercial production of polyurethane foam in 1952.

== Material ==
Synthetic sponges can be made of polyester, polyurethane, or vegetable cellulose. Polyurethane is used in polyester sponges for their abrasive side. Polyester sponges are more common for dish washing and are usually soft and yellow. Microplastics and nanoplastics can be released from kitchen sponges during use.

Vegetable cellulose sponges made of wood fiber are used more for bathing and skin cleaning, and are usually tougher and more expensive than polyester sponges. They are considered more eco-friendly than polyester sponges as they are biodegradable and made of natural materials.

Materials used in manufactured household sponges
Material	Characteristics	Common uses
Regenerated cellulose	Absorbent; available with different pore sizes	Household cleaning
Polyurethane foam	Soft, resilient, cellular structure	Kitchen and general cleaning
Melamine foam	Fine porous structure; mildly abrasive	Removing marks and stains

== Harboring bacteria ==
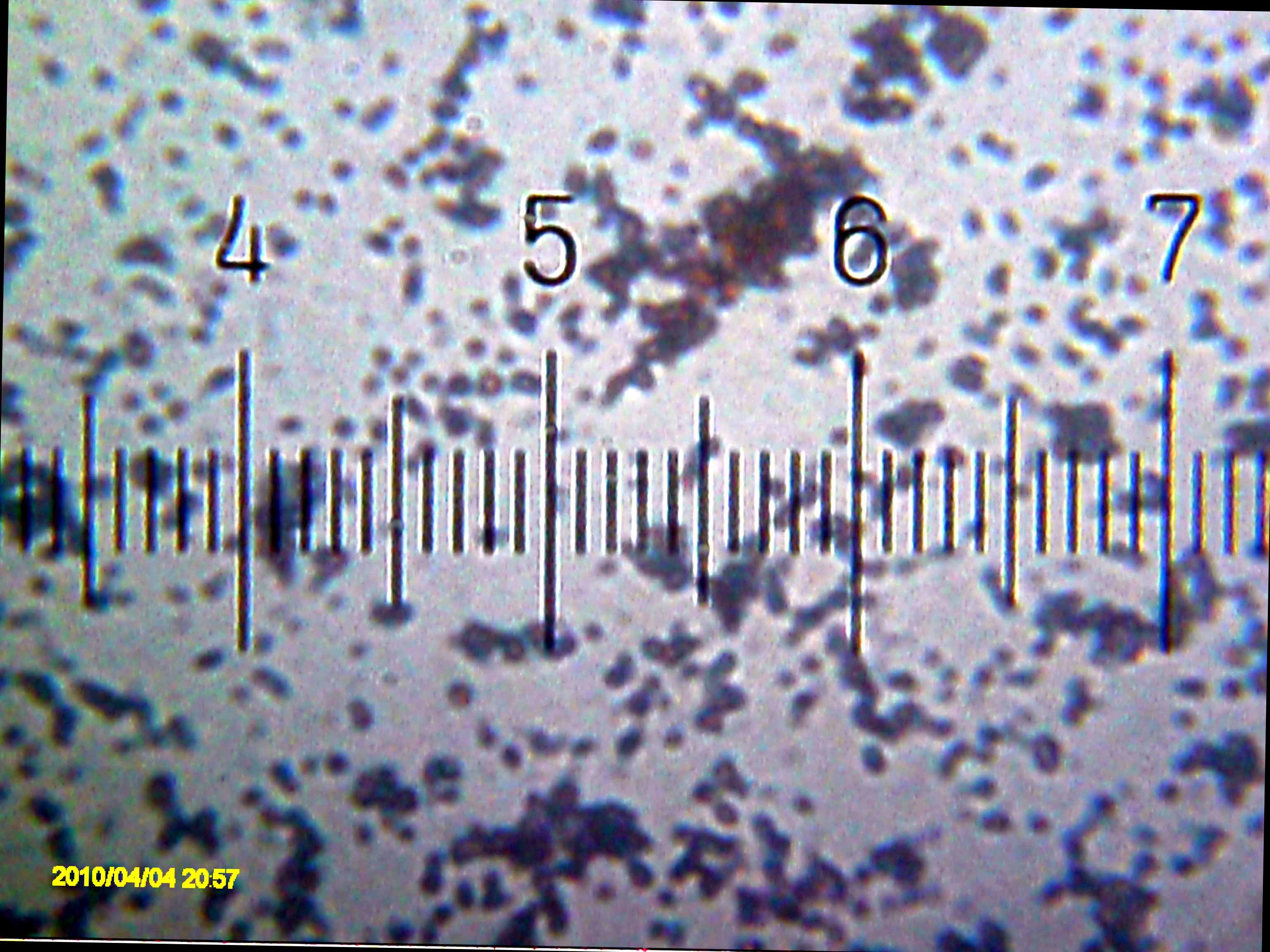
Bacteria from a kitchen sponge

A sponge can be a medium for the growth of harmful bacteria or fungi, especially when it is allowed to remain wet between uses. Studies have found some sponges can harbor Salmonella bacteria for more than seven days.

=== Cleaning ===
Several methods have been used to clean sponges. A 2009 study showed that the microwave and the dishwasher were both effective ways to clean domestic sponges. Leaving sponges soaking in a dilute solution of dish detergent discourages bacterial growth.

Studies have investigated the use of the microwave to clean non-metallic domestic sponges that have been thoroughly moistened. A 2006 study found that microwaving wet sponges for two minutes (at 1000 watt power) killed 99% of coliforms, E. coli, and MS2 phages, but Bacillus cereus spores required four minutes. After some fires were caused by people trying to replicate the results at home, the study's author urged people to make sure their sponges were wet before treatment.

== Economy ==
Countries around the Caribbean and the Mediterranean Sea are the largest sea sponge exporters, whereas the largest importers are developed European and North-American countries. Tunisia is the world's main sea sponge exporter, exporting 90% of its sponge production. France is the main importer, being supplied by Tunisia, but France's sponge demand has fallen in recent years.

Main sponge exporters (in metric tons exported)
Exporters	1981	1982	1983	1984	1985	1986
Tunisia	74	71	84	81	91	88
Cuba	36	33	38	33	41	41
France	25	26	33	31	35	30
Greece	32	42	36	27	32	22
Bahamas	-	8	21	8	3	14
Turkey	11	8	7	8	1	1
Egypt	5	4	4	2	4	8
Japan	-	6	4	1	1	6
Philippines	9	4	5	6	6	4
Libya	-	-	-	6	3	-
Total	192	202	232	213	245	225

== See also ==
- Dishcloth
- Ethylene-vinyl acetate – material that craft foam is made from ethylene-vinyl and acetate
- Holy Sponge
- Luffa aegyptiaca
- Sponge metal
- Capillary action
- Shower puff (Loofah)
- SpongeBob SquarePants
- Dawn (brand)
- Scrub Daddy
