= Shower puff =

Shower accessory

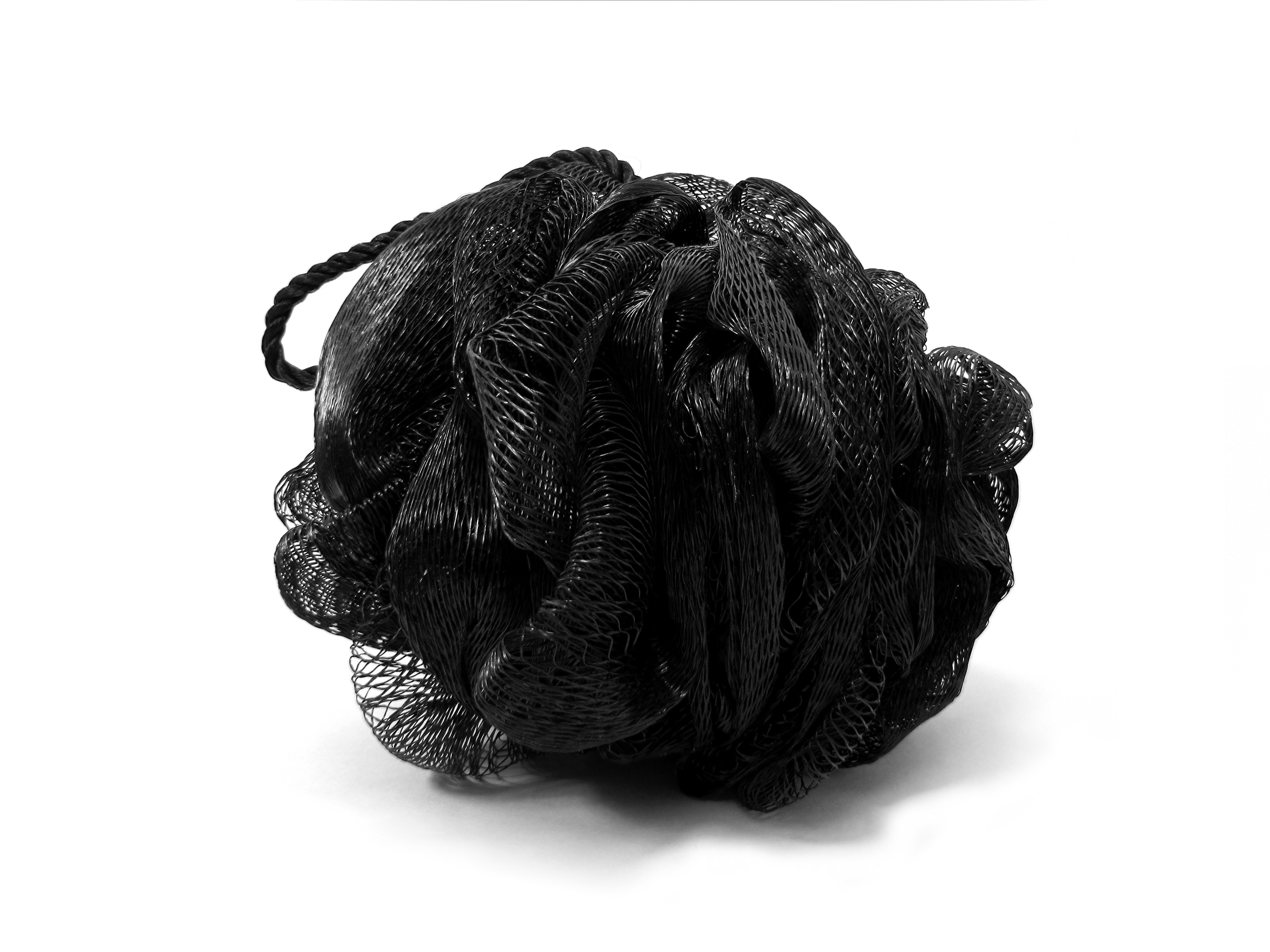
A black shower puff

A shower puff also known as a shower sponge, is a popular shower accessory used for cleaning one's skin in the shower as an alternative to a natural sponge or luffa. It is used to scrub soap into one's skin when washing, and then wash it off again afterwards. It is also used to wash dry or dead skin off. Whilst popular, some dermatologists recommend against the use of a shower puff, because they can harbour bacteria, yeast, and mould.
