= Toilet brush =

Tool for cleaning a toilet bowl

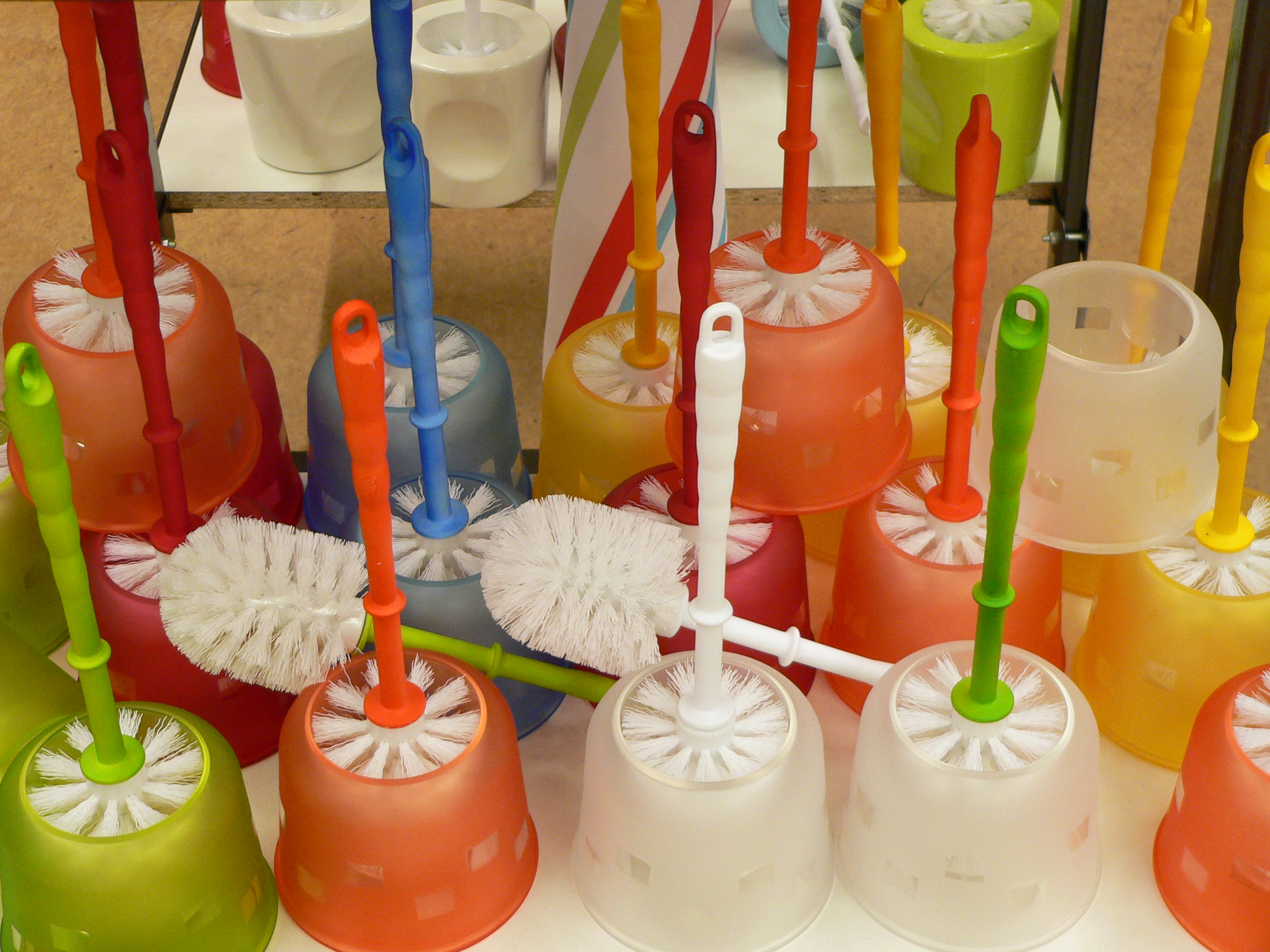
Toilet brushes and holders

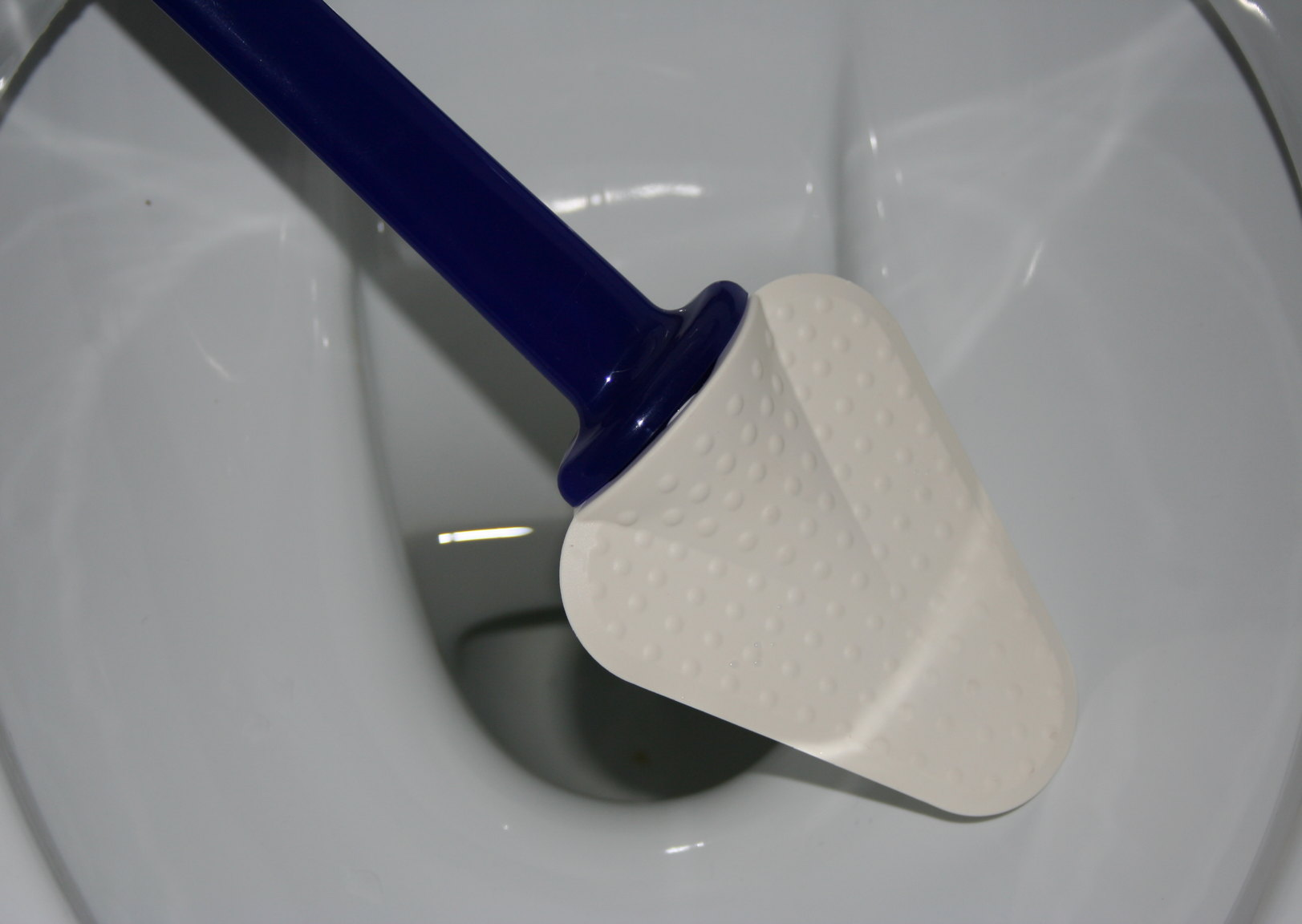
Modern toilet brush made with silicone polymer

A toilet brush is a tool for cleaning a toilet bowl.

Generally the toilet brush is used with toilet cleaner or bleach. The toilet brush can be used to clean the upper area of the toilet, around the bowl. However, it cannot be used to clean very far into the toilet's U-bend and usually not used to clean the toilet seat.

In many cultures it is considered impolite to clean away biological debris without the use of chemical toilet cleaning products, as this can leave residue on the bristles. By contrast, others consider it impolite not to clean away biological debris immediately using the toilet brush.

A typical toilet brush consists of a hard bristled end, usually with a rounded shape and a long handle. Today toilet brushes are commonly made of plastic, but were originally made of wood with pig bristles or from the hair of horses, oxen, squirrels and badgers. The brush is typically stored in a holder, but in some cases completely hidden in a tube.

Electric toilet brushes differ from normal toilet brushes. The bristles are fastened to the rotor of a motor which works similarly to an electric toothbrush. The power supply is attached without any metal contact via electromagnetic induction.

In recent years, there has been a general shift in design with a new emphasis on ergonomically designed brushes. Further design enhancements have included innovative holders that snap shut around the bristled end, thereby preventing the release of smells, germs and other unpleasantries.

Further development of the traditional toilet brush focuses on the risk of germ incubation within the brush holder. In this direction, a toilet brush has been patented which introduces a reservoir of anti-bacterial fluid, allowing the brush to be dipped and sanitized after each use.

The first successful artificial Christmas tree was made from brush bristles by Addis using the same machinery used to manufacture its toilet brushes. The trees were made from the same animal-hair bristles used in the brushes, except they were dyed green.

== Recent developments ==
In recent years many new products aiming to reinvent the traditional toilet brush have emerged to the market.

- The LooBlade is a toilet brush with an 8-blade silicone head and hydrophobic properties that sheds water and dries quickly. It is claimed to be able to kill 99.9% of germs during and after cleaning. It was invented by Garry Stewart.
- The Loogun is an alternative to the toilet brush. It is a pressure washer that sprays a powerful jet of clean water that washes away marks both above and below the water line. The device never touches the toilet, so the device stays hygienic.
- The Handi Sani is a self-cleaning toilet brush. It works by attaching the Handi Sani brush holder to the side of the tank with one small hose running into the tank to take advantage of clean water, and another hose running into the toilet bowl for proper draining. The brush is placed inside the Handi Sani so that when the toilet is flushed, the attachment fills up with clean water while simultaneously draining the dirty water into the toilet bowl.

== In popular culture ==
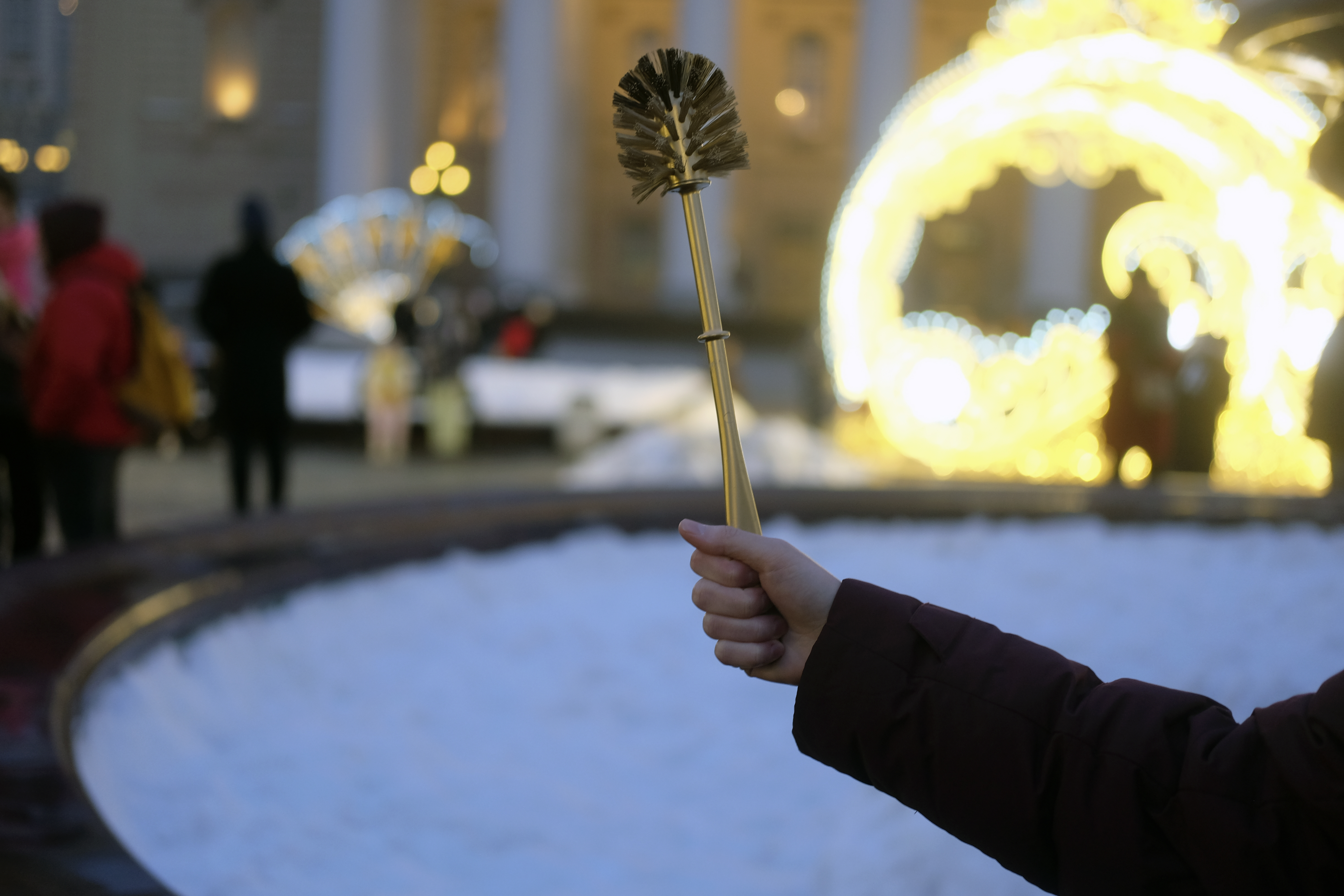
Protester holding a golden toilet brush

The toilet brush became one of the symbols of the widespread Russian protests in support of Alexei Navalny that took place in January 2021. An investigation led by the Anti-Corruption Foundation suggested that each of the toilet brushes at the alleged personal residence of President Vladimir Putin cost about €700.

== See also ==
- Automatic self-clean toilet seat
- Bidet
- Shit stick
- Toilet (room)
- Washlet
- Xylospongium
