= Dharma combat =

Practice in some schools of Buddhism

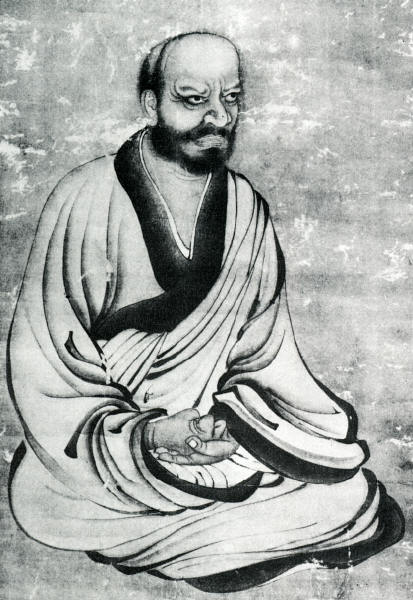
Portrait of Zen master Línjì Yìxuán, one of the most renowned practitioners of Dharma combat

Dharma combat, called issatsu (一拶, いっさつ; literally "challenge") or shosan in Japanese, is a term in some schools of Buddhism referring to an intense exchange between student and teacher, and sometimes between teachers, as an occasion for one or both to demonstrate his or her understanding of the Dharma and Buddhist tenets. It is used by both students and teachers to test and sharpen their understanding. Practice is primarily seen in Zen traditions, particularly Rinzai Zen and the Kwan Um School of Zen. In both, it is a key component in the Dharma transmission process.

Zen practitioners will often have a sanzen, where the student has a face to face interview with their master. This is also called nishitsu, which literally means "entering the room" and refers to the student entering the room for private dharma combat.

An exchange is initiated when a master issues a challenge to members either individually or as a group. The master will use confrontation as an emotionally charged tool to push a student into immediate realization.

The Dharma combat usually appears to be in the form of a debate, with questions and answers that seem illogical to an outside observer. These encounters may involve dialogues with non-verbal elements as well as verbal. An exchange between combatants will often show disjointed comments, shouting and even slapping. These encounters, where the student's flaws in understanding or practice of dharma are exposed, have left students with a reluctance to enter the room used for combat.

As Peter D. Hershock asserts, the term itself provides insight into the risks of the encounter between student and master. Traditionally, Buddhism is known for helping others to attain peace and freedom from affliction. The usage of a martial term to describe enlightenment, he attests, cannot be accidental. The student is in danger of losing the ability to maintain their prior chosen heading, much the same as in a battle.

== History ==
The first known recorded examples of Dharma combat occurred during the "Classical" period of Zen history. Stretching roughly from 765 to 950 C.E., this period saw the rise of many Zen masters whose work is still widely studied in modern Zen Buddhism today.

One of these masters was Línjì Yìxuán (Rinzai Gigen in Japanese). Linji died in 866 and was the founder of the Linji school of Zen Buddhism during the Tang dynasty in China. Many examples of dharma combat can be found in the collection of sayings by and about Línjì. On occasions the Dharma combat of Linji even extended to physical handling, as in the following example:

From the High Seat, the master said: "Upon the lump of red flesh there is a True Man of no Status who ceaselessly goes out and in through the gates of your face. Those who have not yet recognized him, look out, look out!"

A monk came forward and asked: "What is the True Man of no Status?"

The master descended from the meditation cushion, grabbed (the monk) and said: "Speak, speak!"

The monk hesitated. The master released him and said: "What a shit-stick this True Man of no Status is!" Then he withdrew to his quarters.

— Línjì Yìxuán, The Zen Teachings of Rinzai

In another example, he recounts a question from Ma-yu: "Of the eyes of the thousand-armed bodhisattva of compassion, which is the true eye?" Línjì repeats the question, adding "Answer me! Answer me!" Then, Ma-yu "dragged the Master down from the lecture seat and sat in it himself."
