= Xylospongium =

Ancient Roman implement for anal hygiene

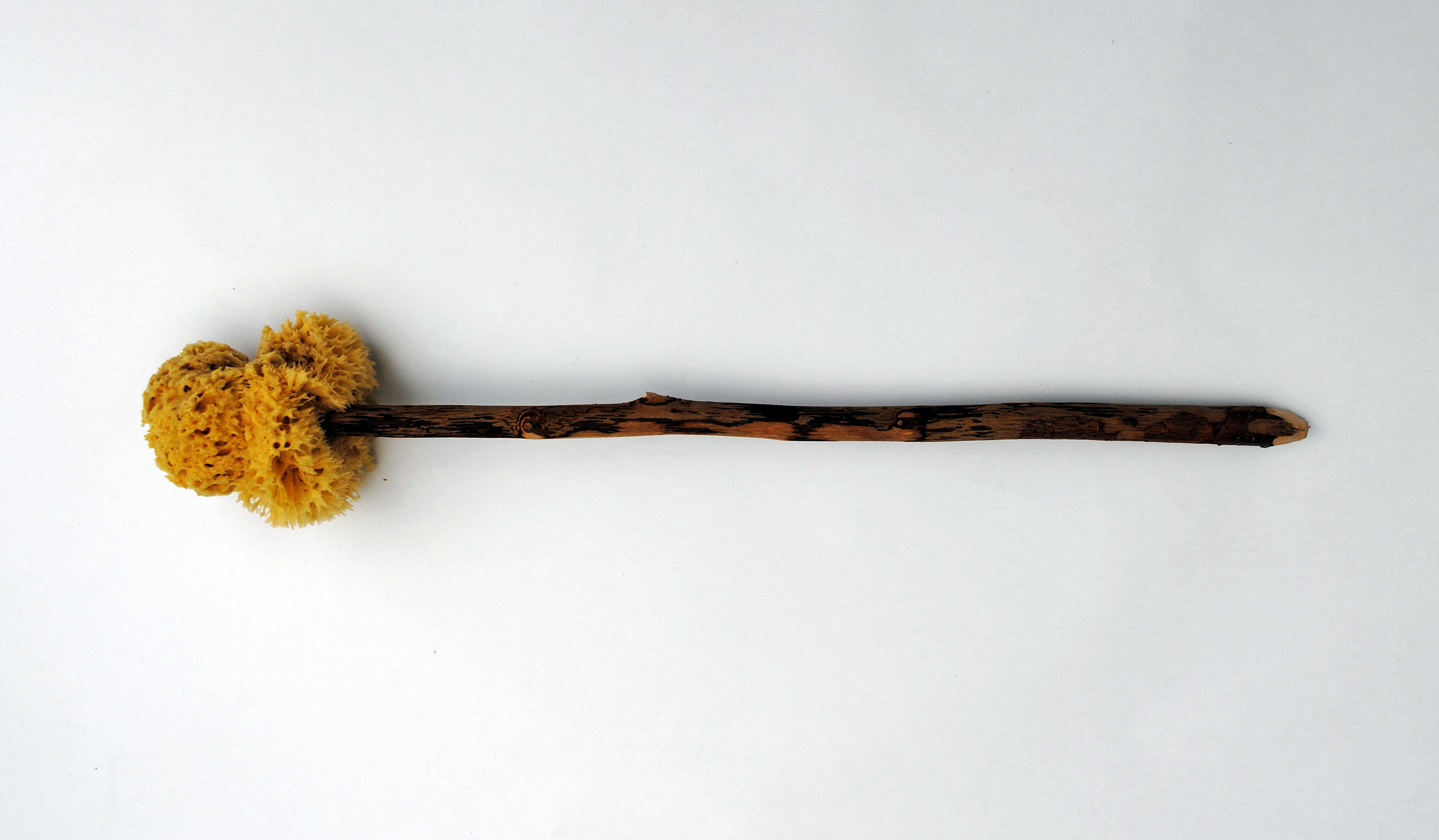
A replica xylospongium (sponge on a stick)

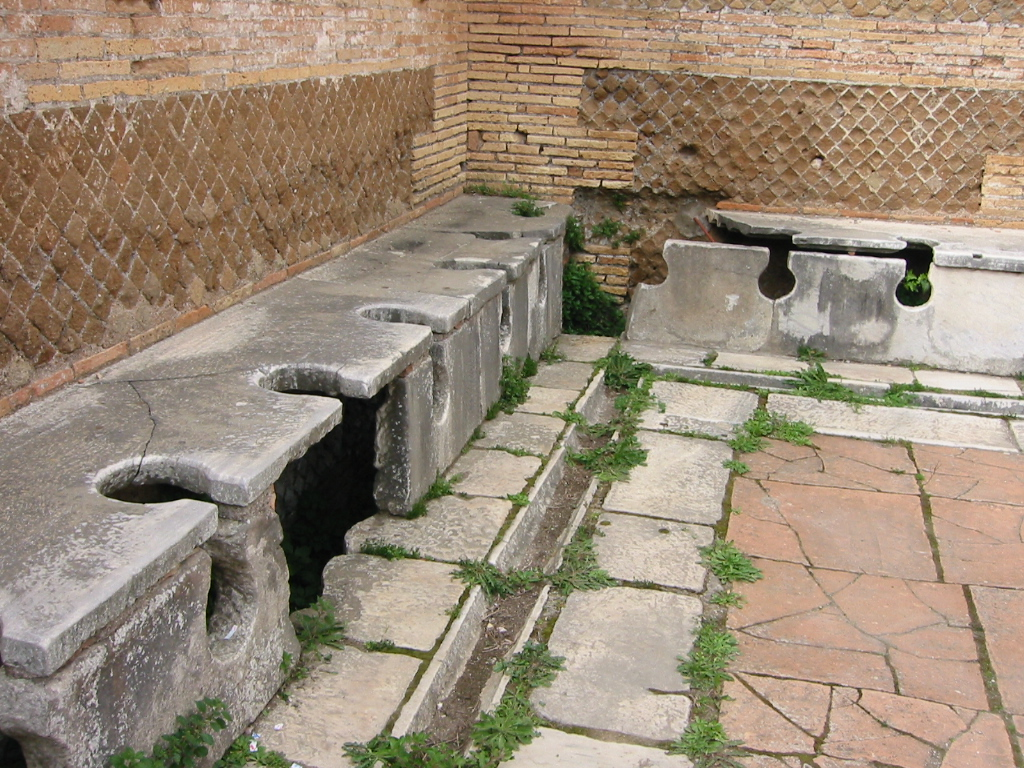
Ancient Roman latrines in Ostia Antica

The xylospongium, also known as a tersorium, or a "sponge on a stick", was a hygiene utensil found in ancient Roman latrines, consisting of a wooden stick (Greek: ξύλον, xylon) with a sea sponge (Greek: σπόγγος, spongos) fixed at one end.

Academics disagree as to its exact use, primarily because the primary sources are vague. It has traditionally been assumed to be a type of shared anal hygiene utensil used to wipe after defecating, and the sponge cleaned in vinegar or water (sometimes salt water). Other recent research suggests it was most likely a toilet brush.

In the Baths of the Seven Sages in Ostia, a fresco from the 2nd century contains the Inscription (u)taris xylosphongio which is the first known mention of the term. Also in the early second century, a papyrus letter of Claudius Terentianus to his father Claudius Tiberianus uses the term xylesphongium in a phrase.

== See also ==
- Bidet shower
- Shit stick

== General references ==
=== Primary sources ===
- Claudius Terentianus, Michigan Papyri VIII 471 (inv. 5393) = CEL 146 = ChLA XLII 1220 29.
- Seneca, Epistulae morales Liber 8, 70, 20.
- Martial, Epigrammata, Liber 12,48,7.

=== Secondary sources ===
- Richard Neudecker: Die Pracht der Latrine. Zum Wandel öffentlicher Bedürfnisanstalten in der kaiserzeitlichen Stadt. Pfeil-Verlag, München 1994 (Studien zur antiken Stadt, Bd. 1) ISBN 3-923871-86-4, pp. 36f.
- Gilbert Wiplinger: "Der Gebrauch des Xylospongiums – eine neue Theorie zu den hygienischen Verhältnissen in römischen Latrinen". In: SPA . SANITAS PER AQUAM. Tagungsband des Internationalen Frontinus-Symposiums zur Technik – und Kulturgeschichte der antiken Thermen Aachen, 18. – 22. März 2009. Frontinus-Gesellschaft e.V. & Peeters, Leiden 2012. ISBN 978-90-429-2661-5. pp. 295–304.
- The Sponge-Stick: Scatological Undertones to Christ's Humiliation at the Crucifixion. Benjamin J. Rusch. 2023, Global Journal of Classical Theology.
