= Claudius Tiberianus =

Second-century Roman legionary soldier

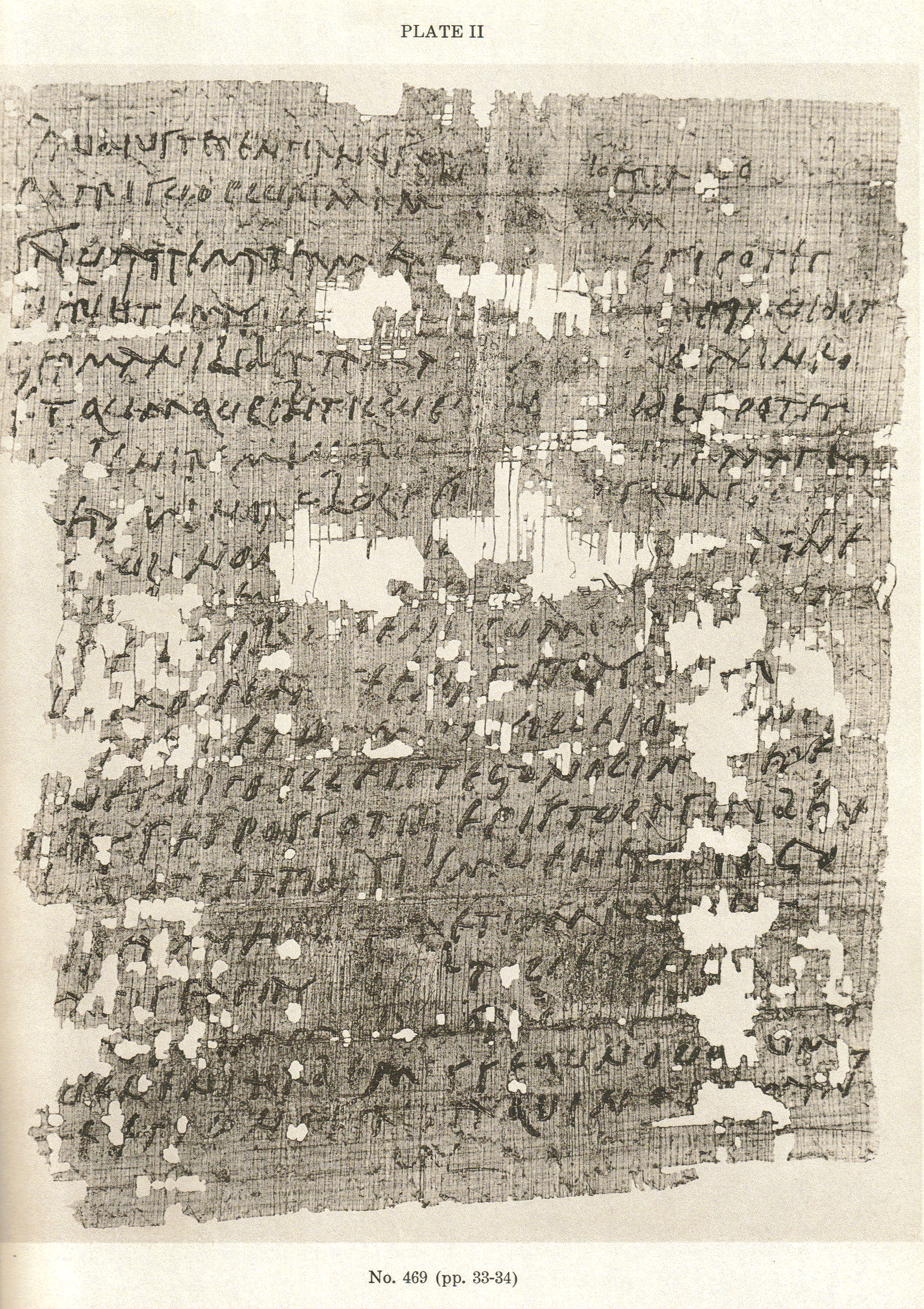
- Papyrus P.Mich. VIII 469

Soldier of the Roman Empire

Personal details
- Born: c. 1st century AD
- Died: c. 2nd century AD
- Occupation: Ancient Roman soldier

Claudius Tiberianus was a second-century Roman legionary soldier in Egypt, the recipient of a number of papyrus letters which were rediscovered in the twentieth century.

The archive of Claudius Tiberianus was partially published in the eighth volume (Nos. 467–81) of the University of Michigan Papyrology Collection. It comprises 18 papyrus-letters, mostly written by Claudius Terentianus, an Egyptian enrolled in the Roman army, who addresses him as "father." These texts constitute an ancient archive, as they include the letters which were found together in a niche under the staircase of the house of Tiberianus at Karanis between 1924 and 1935, along with further texts, which emerged from the antiquities market.

== Military career ==
Claudius Tiberianus first appears as a speculator legionis, a legionary soldier on detachment as a special agent to the provincial governor. He holds this title at the time his son Terentianus enrolled in the fleet at Alexandria, around 110 AD. Shortly thereafter, he retired, and is subsequently referred to as a veteran. Terentianus writes to Tiberianus requesting both military equipment as well as contacts to help him transfer from the fleet to a legion.

== Family ==
It is generally held that Claudius Tiberianus had at least one son, Claudius Terentianus. In addition, a letter from a sister in Alexandria refers to two other children, Isidorus and Segathis. In all likelihood, this sister is the woman named Tabetheus who identifies herself as his sister in a different letter. Tabetheus is the mother of a man named Saturnilus, who subsequently murdered a man. Tabetheus sought help from Tiberianus in paying the blood money to settle the murder charge. While it is possible that Tiberianus is merely a patron to all the people mentioned in the letters, and the kinship terms of "father" and "brother" are honorific, in all likelihood most of the correspondents in the Tiberianus archive represent blood relatives.
