= Claudius Terentianus =

1st-century Egyptian enrolled in the Roman army

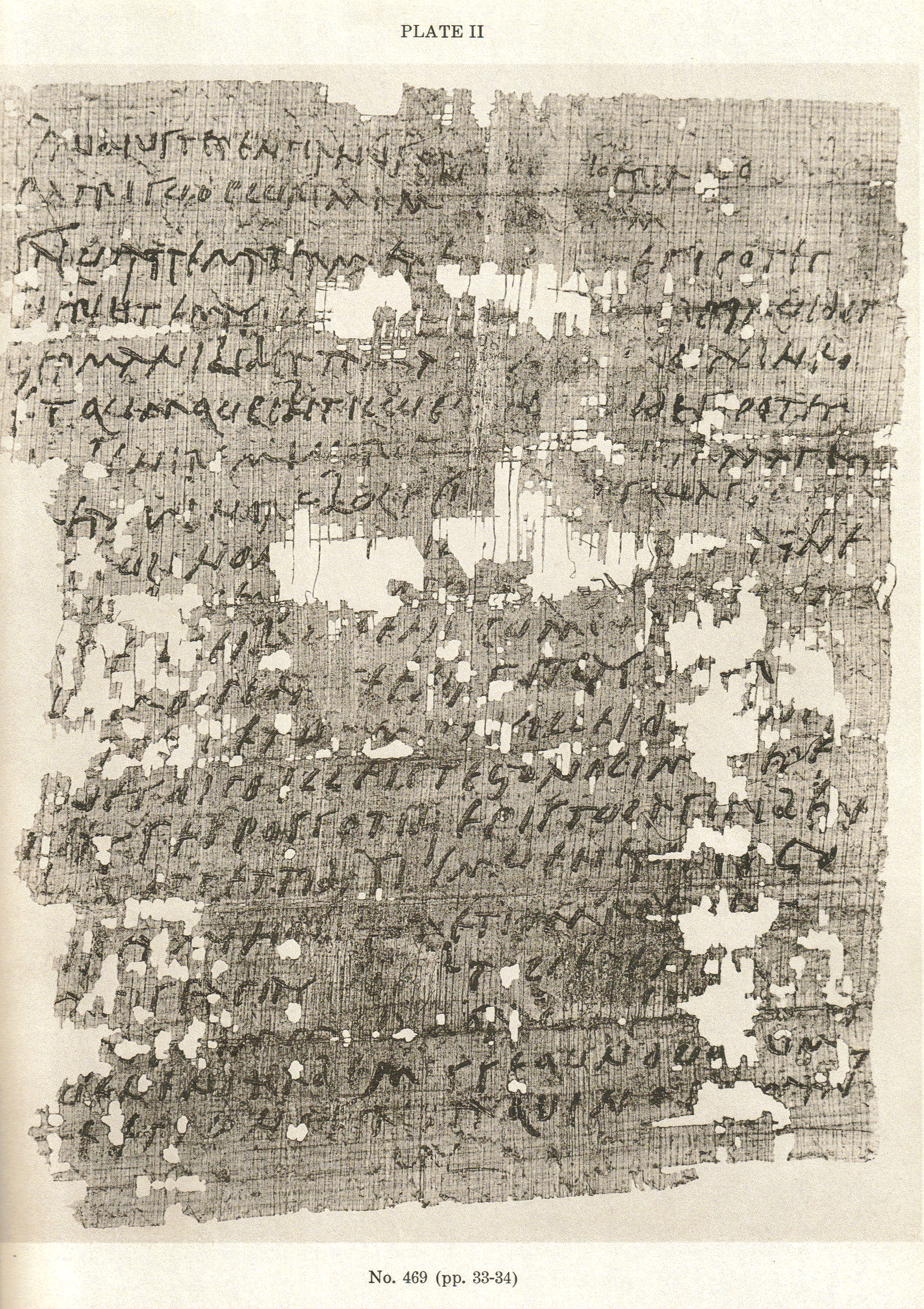
- Papyrus P.Mich. VIII 469

Soldier of the Roman Empire
- In office c. 110 AD – c. 136 AD

Personal details
- Born: c. 1st century AD
- Died: c. 2nd century AD
- Occupation: Ancient Roman soldier

Claudius Terentianus was an Egyptian enrolled in the Roman army sometime before 136 AD. He was the author of a number of papyrus-letters, mostly addressed to his father Claudius Tiberianus, a veteran settled in Karanis, Egypt. They were found in that village in 1928-29 during excavations conducted by the University of Michigan. Specifically, the letters were found in a house identified as C/B167, located near the center of the town, beneath a staircase on the ground floor in a niche.

== Military service ==
Claudius Terentianus attempted to get into the Roman Army but, lacking suitable references, failed and enlisted in the lower status and more dangerous classis Alexandriae (Alexandrian fleet) sometime around 110 AD. He complained about life in the fleet and never gave up hope of joining the Roman army, subsequently achieving his dream of transferring to a legion. He was deployed to Syria, possibly in relation to Trajan's Parthian campaign, and was wounded quelling civic unrest in Alexandria. Only around 50% of Roman soldiers survived to retirement. He was discharged in 136 AD after a full military career, and likely settled in the village of Karanis.

== Family ==
Claudius Terentianus repeatedly refers to Claudius Tiberianus as his father. While a few scholars think this may be an honorary title, most believe that Terentianus is Tiberianus' biological son (both do share the same nomen). Terentianus also calls another man named Ptolemaios "father" (P Mich 5393); this is likely an honorary designator, although Ptolemaios may be his uncle by marriage. Terentianus also refers to a woman he calls his "mother" living in Alexandria, who is most likely his aunt Tabetheus. If she is the same woman who addresses Claudius Tiberianus as "brother" in P. Mich 5403, then she was living in Alexandria near where Terentianus was stationed. The same letter mentions that Terentianus had a brother named Isidoros and a sister named Segathis, who are being cared for by the aunt in Alexandria. It may be that Tiberianus was a widower, and entrusted his children to his sister in Alexandria while he was occupied with his own military career.

== Letter highlights ==
- P Michigan 5390: Results of a shopping spree in Alexandria; request for new boots.
- P Michigan 5391: Terentianus recounts his enlistment in the fleet, and requests military equipment.
- P Michigan 5393: Dispute with Ptolemaios, his "father," addressed to Claudius Terentianus, his father.
- P Michigan 5400: A Riot in Alexandria, Terentianus is wounded. Possibly connected to the diaspora revolt of 115–117 AD.

== Exhibitions ==
Claudius Terentianus was the unexpected hero of the British Museum's "Life in the Roman Army" exhibition from Feb- June 2024. As part of their initiative to make exhibitions more relatable and personal, the exhibition followed his life story as he attempted to, joined, then retired from the Roman Army.
