= Shit stick =

Stick used to clean self after defecating

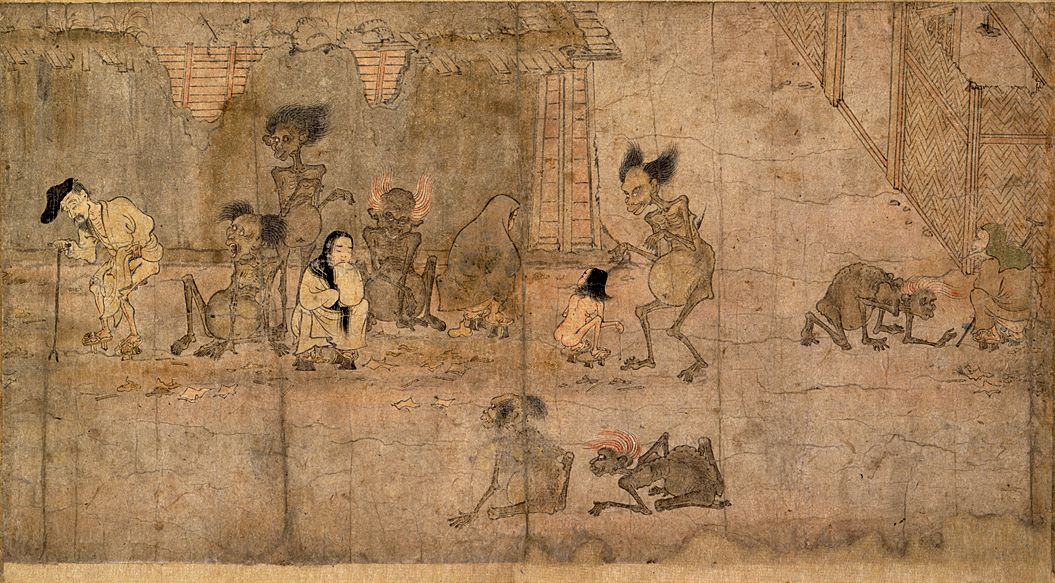
Gaki zōshi (餓鬼草紙, "Scroll of Hungry Ghosts"). A gaki condemned to shit-eating watches a child wearing geta and holding a chūgi, c. 12th century.

Shit stick means "a thin stake or stick used instead of toilet paper" for anal hygiene and was a historical item of material culture introduced through Chinese Buddhism and Japanese Buddhism. A well-known example is in a watō from the Chan/Zen gōng'àn/kōan, in which a monk asked "what is buddha?" and Master Yunmen/Unmon answered "a dry shit stick" (gānshǐjué/kanshiketsu, 乾屎橛/乾屎橛) .

== History ==
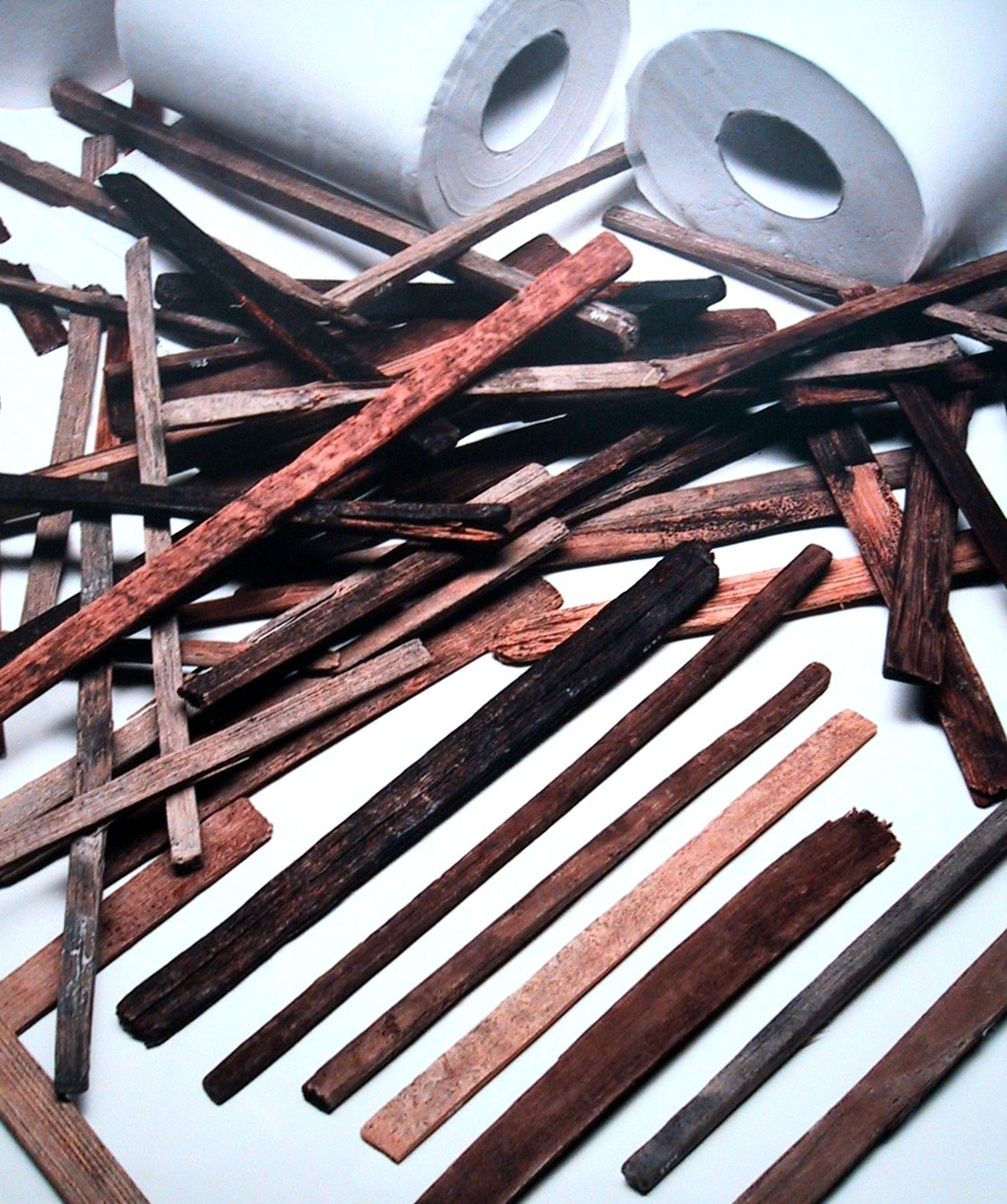
Japanese chūgi from the Nara period (710–784), shown with modern toilet paper for size comparison

People have used many different materials in the history of anal hygiene, including leaves, rags, paper, water, sponges, corncobs, and sticks.

According to the historians of Chinese science Joseph Needham and Lu Gwei-djen,

In very ancient times, instruments of bamboo, possibly spatulas ([cèchóu] 廁籌, [cèbì] 廁篦, or [cèjiǎn] 廁簡), may have been used with the assistance of water in cleaning the body after defecation. At other times and places, it seems that pieces of earthenware or pottery were so used. Undoubtedly one material which found employment in this respect was waste silk rag.

When monks and missionaries introduced Buddhism into China and Japan, they also brought the Indian custom of using a śalākā "small stake, stick, or rod" for wiping away excrement. Translators rendered this Sanskrit word into different neologisms such as Chinese cèchóu 廁籌 and Japanese chūgi (籌木), and the custom of using shit sticks became popular. They had the advantage of being inexpensive, washable, and reusable.

The Chinese invented paper around the 2nd century BCE, and toilet paper no later than the 6th century CE, when Yan Zhitui noted, "Paper on which there are quotations or commentaries from the Five Classics or the names of sages, I dare not use for toilet purposes".

The earliest Japanese flush toilets date from the Nara period (710–784), when a drainage system was constructed in the capital at Nara, with squat toilets built over 10–15 cm (3.9–5.9 in) wide wooden conduits that users would straddle. Archaeological excavations in Nara have also found numerous chūgi wooden sticks used for fecal cleansing. Matsui et al. explain that Japanese archeologists have discovered comparatively few toilets because "the decisive factors in identifying toilets were fly maggots and flat sticks called chūgi used as a toilet paper," but the preservation of such artifacts requires the environment of a wetland site where organic remains are constantly soaked with groundwater.

Archeologists discovered 2,000-year-old shit sticks in a latrine at Xuanquanzhi 悬泉置, in the town of Dunhuang, Gansu. Xuanquanzhi was a Han dynasty military base and relay station (111 BCE – CE 109) at the eastern end of the Silk Road. Analysis of preserved fecal matter found on cloth covers wrapped around the ends of sticks revealed the remains of roundworm (Ascaris lumbricoides), whipworm (Trichuris trichiura), tapeworm (Taenia solium), and Chinese liver fluke (Clonorchis sinensis).

== Terminology ==
The Chinese and Japanese lexicons have various words meaning "shit stick". They are divisible into compounds of chóu or chū 籌 "small stake or stick", jué or ketsu 橛 "short stake or stick", and other terms.

=== Chou or Chū ===
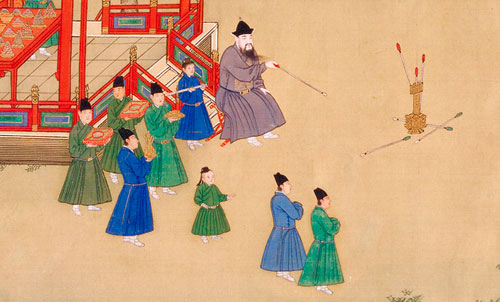
Ming dynasty Xuande Emperor playing touhu, 15th century

Chinese chóu or Japanese chū 籌 "small stake; stick; chip; tally; counter; token" is used in the "shit stick" terms and chóumù or chūgi 籌木 (with 木 "tree; wood") and cèchóu 廁籌 (with 廁 "toilet").

Chóu or chū was used to translate the polysemous Buddhist Sanskrit term śalāka or śalākā (Pali: salākā).

śalākā any small stake or stick, rod (for stirring [etc]), twig (smeared with lime for catching birds), rib (of an umbrella), bar (of a cage or window), chip, splinter, splint, pencil (for painting or applying collyrium).

- (1) a piece of bamboo (borne as a kind of credential by mendicants and marked with their name).
- (2) the quill of a porcupine.
- (3) an oblong quadrangular piece of ivory or bone (used in playing a partic[ular] game).
- (4) a peg, pin, arrow-head, needle, a probe (used in surgery and sometimes taken as the N[ame] of this branch of, surgery), any pointed instrument.
- (5) a sprout, sprig, shoot of any kind.
- (6) a ruler.
- (7) a toothpick or tooth-brush.
- (8) a match or thin piece of wood (used for ignition by friction).
- (9) a bone.
- (10) a finger, toe.
- (11) a porcupine.
- (12) a partic[ular] thorny shrub, Vanguieria Spinosa.
- (13) the Sārikā bird, Turdus salica (syn. Acridotheres tristis, common myna).
- (14) N[ame] of a town.
- (15) of a woman.

— abridged

In Indian Buddhist contexts, śalākā meant "a piece of wood or bamboo used for counting or voting". The salākāgrahapāka was the elected "collector of votes" in the santhāgāra, or general assembly hall used for voting. The Jain cosmological term salākāpurusa "illustrious or worthy person" compounds salaka "stick used for voting" and purusa "person".

Chou 籌 originally meant "arrow used in tóuhú (ancient drinking game decided by the number of arrows thrown into a pot)" or "tally stick (used in counting)", and by extension came to mean "plan; prepare; collect". Chóu 籌 "shit stick" was first chronicled around the 3rd century CE. The Jin dynasty (266–420) Yulin 語林 by Pei Qi 裴啟 has stories about the ostentatious bathrooms of wealthy merchant Shi Chong 石崇 (249–300), including one about Shi mocking the politician Liu Shi 劉寔 (220–310) for being unfamiliar with the perfumed shit sticks offered by two female restroom attendants.

Cèchóu 廁籌 was first recorded in the (c. 659) History of the Northern Dynasties, when Emperor Wenxuan of Northern Qi (r. 550–560) said that getting Yang Yin to serve as Prime Minister was as difficult as making him present shit sticks.

The Nihon Kokugo Daijiten (2001) defines chūgi (籌木) or chū (籌) as "chips of wood anciently used instead of toilet paper", and cites the earliest recorded usage of chūgi ちうぎ in Ono Ranzan's 小野蘭山 (1847) Jūtei honzō kōmoku keimō (重訂本草綱目啓蒙, "Illuminated Compendium of Materia Medica"). Modern Japanese dialect pronunciations of chūgi include chyōi or chūge in Hida (region) and tsū in Iwate Prefecture.

Translations in English dictionaries of Buddhism include:

- 籌 To calculate, devise, plan; a tally.
- Chū 籌 śalākā. 1. A small stake or stick. A piece of bamboo used for counting and voting. 2. A thin piece of wood, used for wiping away excrement.
- 籌 (Skt. śalāka, śalākā; Pāli salākā). A piece of wood or bamboo used for counting and voting. A tally. To calculate, devise, plan. (Skt. kaṭhikā, vartikā, tūlī, tūli, kalâpa) ... A thin piece of wood used for wiping away excrement.

=== Jue or Ketsu ===
Chinese jué or Japanese ketsu 橛 "short wooden stake; stick; peg; post" is compounded with shi or shǐ 屎 (written with 尸 "body" and 米 "rice") "shit; excrement; dung" into Japanese shiketsu or Chinese shǐjué 屎橛 "shit stick".

The famous term gānshǐjué or kanshiketsu 乾屎橛 "dry shit stick", modified with gān or kan 乾 "dry, dried; hollow", occurs in a famous Chan gōng'àn or Zen kōan recorded in The Gateless Gate (see below).

Definitions in English dictionaries of Buddhism include:

- "乾屎橛 A stick used in India as 'toilet paper', in China paper, straw, or bamboo."
- "Kan-shiketsu 乾屎橛 Excrement-wiping spatula. A word of abuse for a person who clings to things. A typical zen term."
- "Kan-shiketsu Jap., lit. "dry shit stick"; a Zen expression designating a person who is attached to the world of appearance. Kan-shiketsu is the wato of a famous kōan (example 21 of the Wu-men-kuan). The expression stems from a time in China in which a wooden stick was used instead of toilet paper."
- "Kan-shiketsu (Jap. 'dry shit stick') Zen description of person attached to the world of appearance. It is the wato of kōan 21 in the Wu-men kuan."
- "乾屎橛 'Excrement-wiping spatula.' A stick used in India as 'toilet paper,' in China paper, straw, or bamboo. ... In Chan, a term of abuse for someone who is attached to things."

== Bi or Hera ==
Chinese bì 箆 "fine-tooth comb; spatula" or Japanese hera 箆 "spatula; scoop" is compounded into Chinese cèbì 廁箆 "toilet spatula" and Japanese kusobera (糞箆, "shit spatula") or kusokakibera (糞掻き篦, "shit scratching spatula"). While most Japanese "shit stick" words have Sino-Japanese on'yomi readings, such as chūgi from chóumù 籌木, both kuso 糞 "shit; crap" (cf. internet slang kuso) and hera 箆 "spatula; scoop" are native Japanese kun'yomi pronunciations of these kanji (which would be read funhei 糞箆 in Sino-Japanese).

Chinese cebi 廁箆 "toilet spatula" is first recorded in Buddhabhadra's (c. 419) Mohe sengqi lü 摩訶僧祇律 translation of the Mahāsāṃghika version Vinaya Pitaka monastic rules; the toilet etiquette section (明威儀法之一) says inside toilets should have privacy partitions, with cebi shit-sticks placed at the side.

=== Other terms ===
Chinese cèjiǎn 廁簡 or 厕简 "toilet stick" is a synonym of cèchóu 廁籌 (above) using the word jiǎn 簡 "bamboo and wooden slips used for writing; letter; select; choose; simple; brief". Cèjiǎn was first recorded in the (c. 1105) Book of Southern Tang "Biographies of Buddhists" section. During the time of Queen Zhou the Elder (r. 961–964), a monk used a sharpened toilet stick to remove a tumor. Jabamukhi salaka (also from Sanskrit śalākā) was "a curved needle (used in traditional Indian cataract surgery)".

=== English counterparts ===
The English language has some shit(e) stick lexical parallels to these Asian language terms. The Oxford English Dictionary (s.v. shit, shite n.) quotes two early shit-stick examples: "a hard chuffe, a shite-sticks" (1598) and "a shite-sticks, a shite-rags, that is to say, a miserable pinch-pennie" (1659); and (s.v. poop n.^{2}) defines poop-stick as "a fool, ineffectual person", with the earliest usage in 1930. Shit-sticks is metaphorically parallel to shit-rags. In modern usage, Atcheson L. Hench suggests calling someone a shit-stick may combine the ideas of shit and stick-in-the-mud.

The lexicographer Eric Partridge lists three slang terms.

- shit-stick "a despised person" (US 1964)
- shit sticks! "used as a mildly profane expression of disappointment" (US 1964)
- shit(ty) end of the stick "an unfair position to be in; inequitable treatment" (UK 1974)

== Textual usages ==
Words meaning "shit stick" are associated with the Chan/Zen school of Buddhism. Victor Mair explains that most great masters in this school "did not directly state what they wanted to say, but used a conclusive shout or a knock on the head with a rod, or yet spoke such words as 'dry shit stick' that are situated somewhere between comprehensibility and incomprehensibility in order to make a suggestion that would enable their students to partake of enlightenment".

=== The Gateless Gate ===
The Gateless Gate is the Song dynasty Chan master Wumen Huikai's (c. 1228) compilation of 48 kōans. Case 21 is titled Yunmen (kan)shiketsu 雲門(乾)屎橛" "Master Yunmen's (Dried) Shit Stick", referring to the Tang dynasty Chan master Yunmen Wenyan (c. 862–949 CE).

THE CASE

A monk asked Yün-men, "What is Buddha?" [雲門因僧問如何是佛]
Yün-men said, "Dried shitstick." [門云乾屎橛]

WU-MEN'S COMMENT

It must be said of Yün-men that he was too poor to prepare even the plainest food and too busy to make a careful draft. Probably people will bring forth this dried shitstick to shore up the gate and prop up the door. The Buddha Dharma is thus sure to decay.

WU-MEN'S VERSE

A flash of lightning,
sparks from flint;
if you blink your eyes,
it's already gone.

Aitken explains "dried shitstick" as "a soft stick that was used the way our ancestors used a corncob in their outhouses". Jack Kerouac paraphrased "The Buddha is a dried piece of turd".

Owing to the ambiguities of Classical Chinese, the word gānshǐjué or kanshiketsu 乾屎橛 can be parsed as "dried shit-stick" or "dried-shit stick". English translations include:

- "Dried dung"
- "A shit-wiping stick"
- "Kanshiketsu! (a dried shit-stick)"
- "Kanshiketsu!"
- "Dry shit on a stick!"

Sekida and Grimstone note: "Kanshiketsu. A shiketsu, or 'shit-stick' (kan, dry; shi, shit; ketsu, stick), was used in old times instead of toilet paper. It is at once both private and polluted. But in samadhi there is no private or public, no pure or polluted."

=== Record of Linji ===
The Línjì lù or Rinzai roku 臨濟錄 "Record of Linji" contains the compiled sayings of the Tang dynasty Chan master Linji Yixuan or Rinzai Gigen (d. 866 CE). In one famous example of so-called dharma combat, Linji uses the word ganshijue as an epithet, comparable to "You shithead!".

The master, taking the high seat in the hall, said, "On your lump of red flesh is a true man without rank who is always going in and out of the face of every one of you. Those who have not yet confirmed this, look, look!"

Then a monk came forward and asked, "What about the true man without rank?"

The master got down from his seat, seized the monk, and cried, "Speak, speak!"

The monk faltered.

Shoving him away, the master said, "The true man without rank—what kind of dried piece of shit is he!" Then he returned to his quarters.

In an editorial note, Kirchner says Ruth Fuller Sasaki originally translated Chinese ganshijue 乾屎橛 as "shit-wiping stick", saying that the term literally means a "cleaning-off-dung-stick", a smooth stick of bamboo used in place of toilet paper, with 乾 being the verb "to clean". However, Sasaki changed this to "dried piece of shit", following the interpretation of Iriya Yoshitaka, an authority on Tang-dynasty slang, that it means "stick-shaped piece of dung". A comparable usage occurs in the record of Song dynasty Chan master Dahui Zonggao, Dahui Pujue Chanshi yulu 大慧普覺禪師語錄, where the two characters 屎麼 form a noun-compound: "I say to [such stupid monks], 'You're biting on the dung-sticks of others. You're not even good dogs!'." Sasaki's other collaborator, Yanagida Seizan, interprets the term 乾屎橛 to mean "useless dung stick", explaining that 乾 does not have its usual meaning of "dry", but is synonymous with the homophonous 閑 "useless".

Thích Nhất Hạnh comments,

Scholars still aren't sure if the phrase "a stick of dry fecal matter" means the fecal matter dries and becomes very hard like a stick or that the monks there used sticks as toilet paper. The Zen master expressed his disappointment but at the same time used an image opposite of the one we have of the true person. We tend to think of a true person as pure and noble, someone extraordinary, so the Zen master uses this image of a dry piece of fecal matter or dried excrement on a stick to neutralize our view. If we have a set view about what our true person is, then that view has no more value than a piece of dry fecal matter.

== See also ==
- Pessoi
- Toilets in Japan
- Xylospongium
