= Cologne sewerage system =

Sewerage system

Coordinates: 50°57′02″N 6°57′48″E

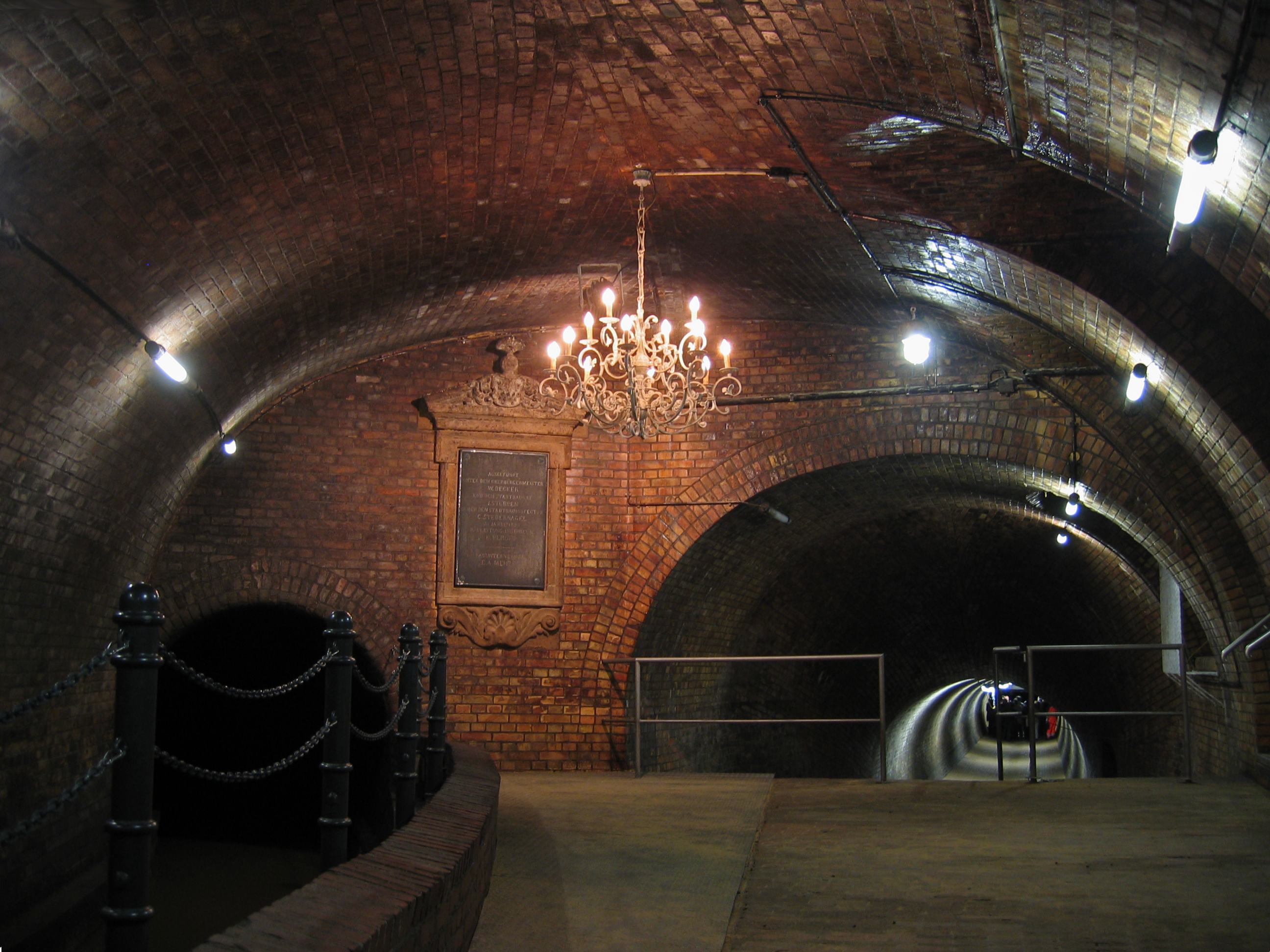
The "Chandelier Hall"

The sewerage system of Cologne is part of the water infrastructure serving Cologne, Germany. Originally built by the Roman Empire in the 1st century, the city's sewer system was modernised in the late 19th century. Parts of the subterranean network are opened for public tours, and the unusual Chandelier Hall (German: Kronleuchtersaal) hosts jazz and classical music performances.

== History ==
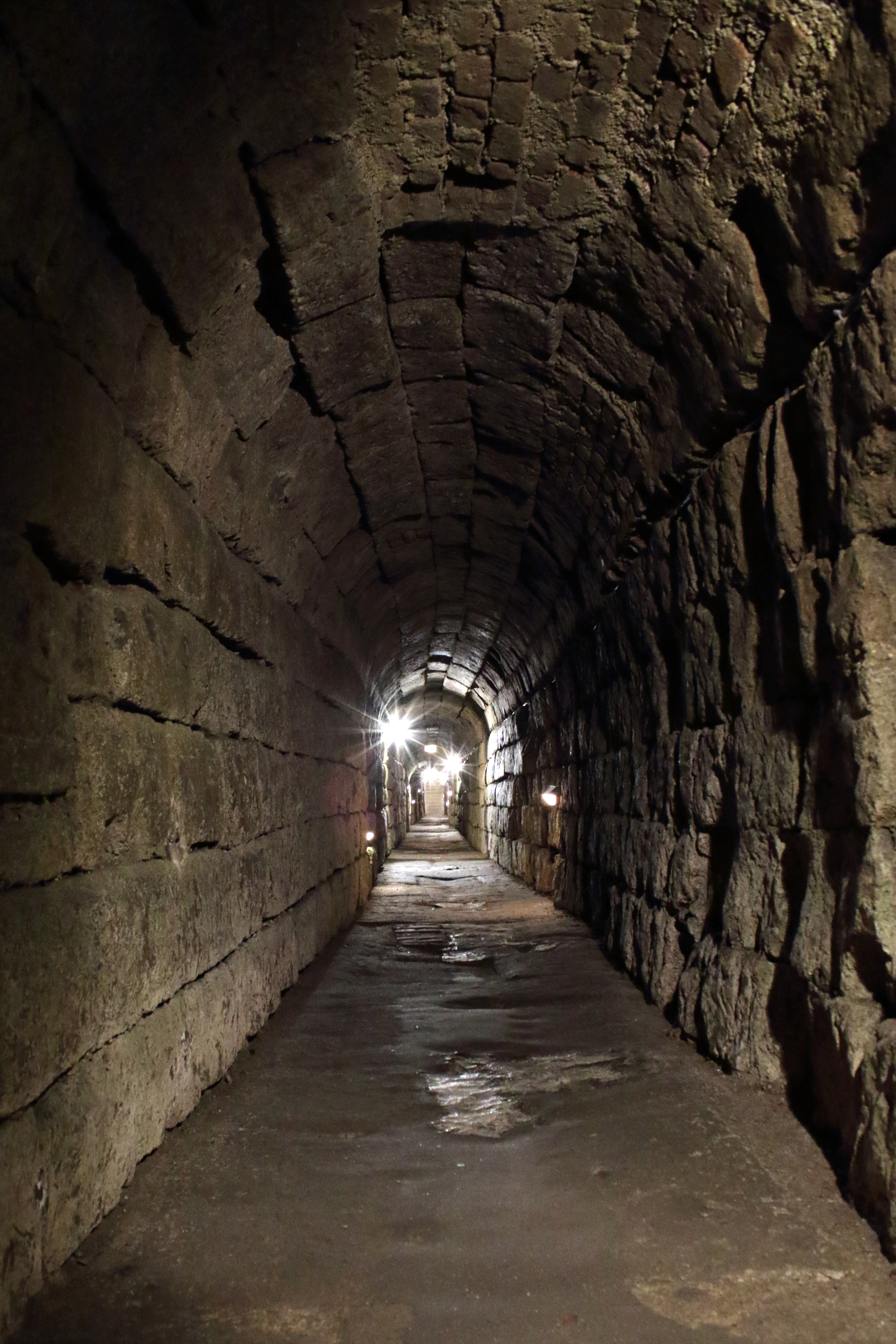
Remaining section of a Roman sewer in Cologne

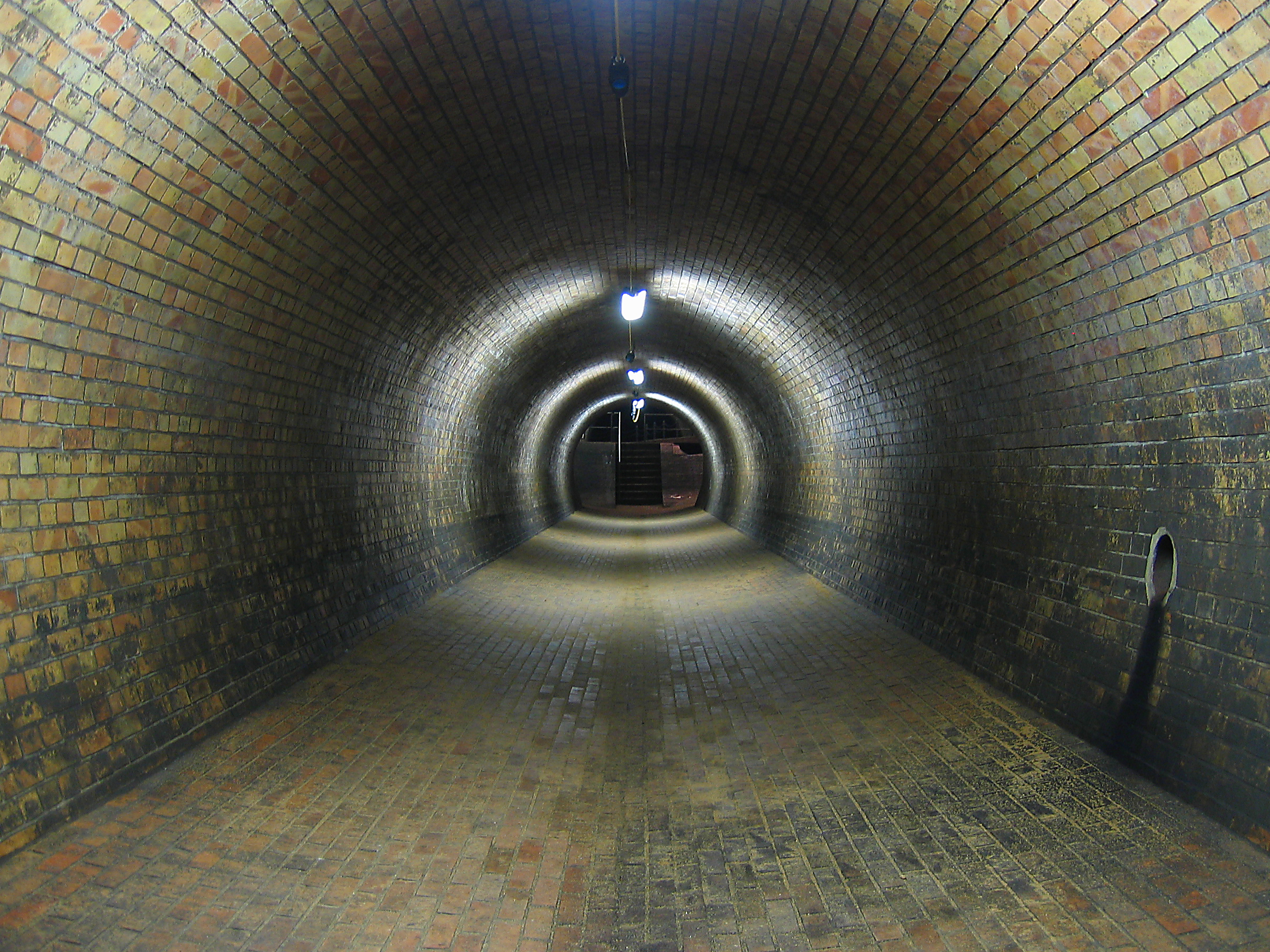
A tunnel for surface water

The first sewers in Cologne were built by the Romans in the 1st century, and there was little change for 1,800 years. As the population of the city was rapidly increasing throughout the 19th century, it became apparent that the existing sewerage system was unable to cope with the volume of waste that was being produced. Raw sewage was directed to the Rhine river, causing significant problems with disease and odor. English poet Samuel Taylor Coleridge wrote in 1828 that the city had "two and seventy stenches, all well defined, and several stinks!"

Paris, London, and other large cities saw an investment in their sewerage system during the 1850s. The people of Cologne had to wait until 1890 for modern sewers to finally open in their city, led by architects Johann Stübben and Carl Steuernagel. By 1900 the boroughs of Deutz, Nippes, and Ehrenfeld were all connected to the system. A mechanised waste water plant opened in 1905 and five purification plants now filter the water before releasing it into the Rhine. By 1933 the length of the system measured 735 kilometres (457 mi), and by 2011 it had expanded to 2,400 kilometres (1,500 mi).

== Notable features and tourism ==
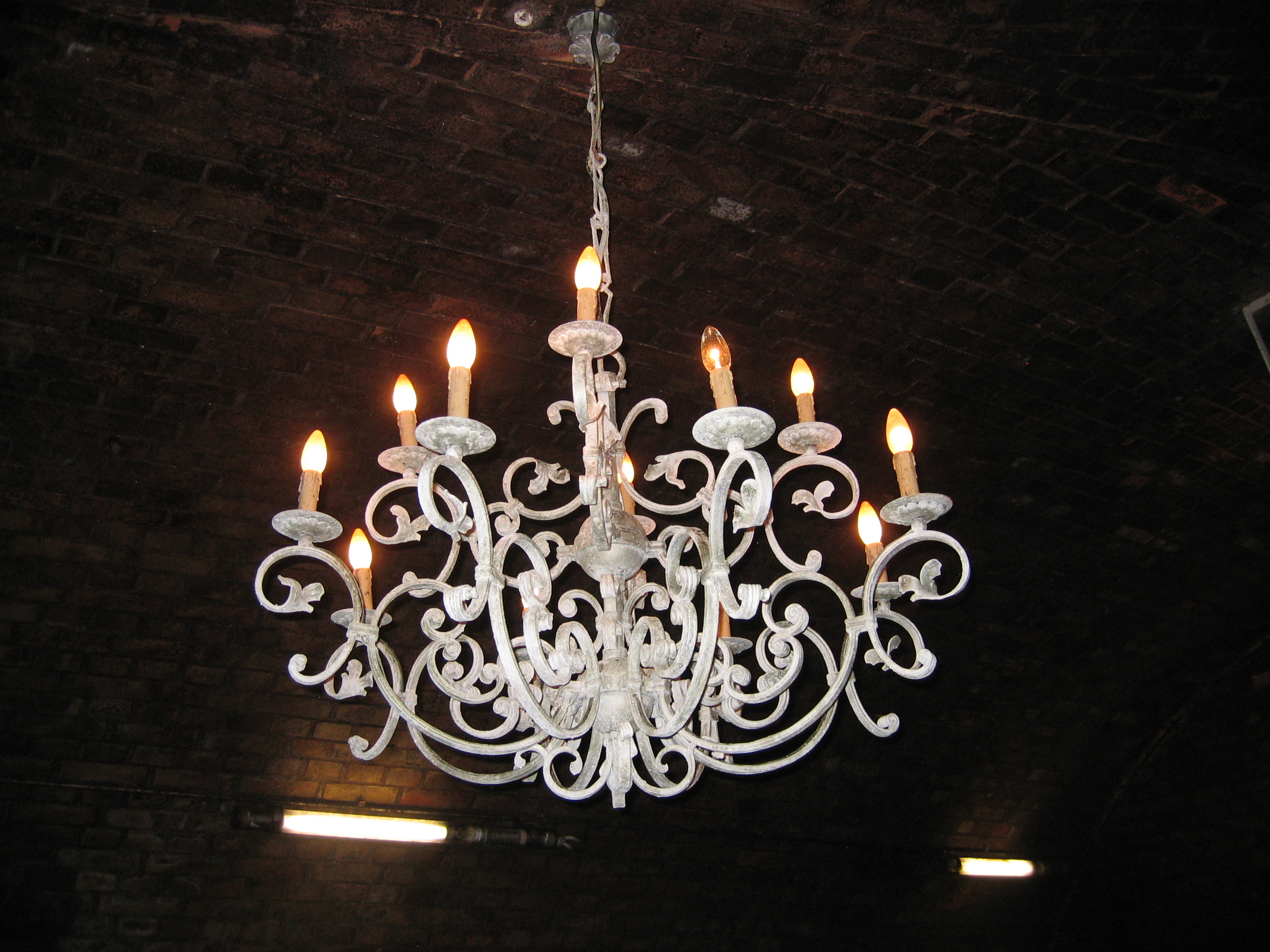
The twelve-arm electric chandelier

The sewers are opened to the public seven times each year, once a month from March to September, giving the public the opportunity to tour the subterranean network. Tours begin underneath the Neustadt-Nord district in the Regenentlastungbauwerk (storm-water overflow structure), a former harbour created during French occupation of the city. Part of the old Roman sewer system is preserved and features in tours. Sections of these old constructions were used for some time as cellars and, during World War II, as air-raid shelters.

An unusual feature of the system is the Kronleuchtersaal (Chandelier Hall). In order to impress German Emperor Wilhelm II, chandeliers were installed in the ceiling, though he was unable to attend the opening ceremony. In 1990 a single electric chandelier was installed. The room has hosted jazz and classical music concerts to audiences of up to 50 people. A stone plaque in the room records the names of the architects and Wilhelm von Becker, the then-mayor of Cologne. The area is listed as being protected.
