= Anal hygiene =

Hygienic practices for the anal area

Anal hygiene refers to practices (anal cleansing) that are performed on the anus to maintain personal hygiene, usually immediately or shortly after defecation. Anal cleansing may also occur while showering or bathing. Post-defecation cleansing is rarely discussed academically, partly due to the social taboo surrounding it. The scientific objective of post-defecation cleansing is to prevent exposure to pathogens.

The process of post-defecation cleansing often involves washing the anus and inner part of the buttocks with water. Water-based cleansing typically involves either the use of running water from a handheld vessel and a hand for washing or the use of pressurized water through a jet device, such as a bidet. In either method, subsequent hand sanitization is essential to achieve the ultimate objectives of post-defecation cleansing. However, many people throughout history have instead wiped or scrubbed the area, most commonly in modern history with toilet paper.

== History ==
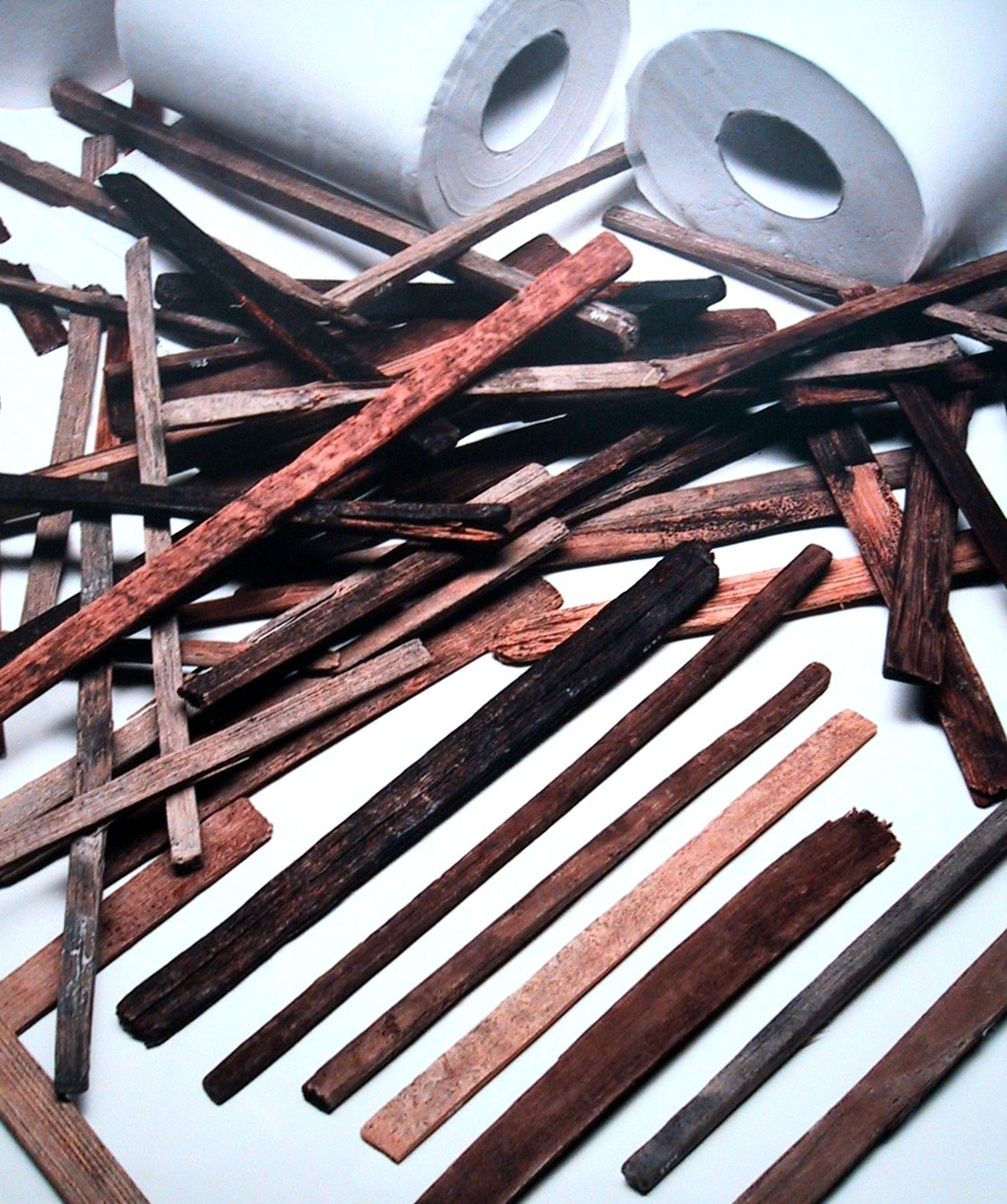
Anal cleansing instruments known as chūgi from the Nara period (710 to 784) in Japan. The modern rolls in the background are for size comparison.

=== Materials ===
The ancient Greeks were known to use fragments of ceramic, known as pessoi (πεσσοί), to perform anal cleansing.

The ancient Romans may have used a tersorium (Ancient Greek: xylospongium), consisting of a sponge on a wooden stick. The stick would be soaked in a water channel in front of a toilet, and then stuck through the hole built into the front of the toilet for anal cleaning. The tersorium was shared by people using public latrines. To clean the sponge, they washed it in a bucket with water and salt or vinegar. However, this became a breeding ground for bacteria, causing the spread of disease in the latrine.

In ancient Japan, wooden skewers known as chuugi ('shit sticks') were used for post-defecation cleaning.

The use of toilet paper first started in ancient China around the 2nd century BC. According to Charlier (2012), French physician François Rabelais had argued about the ineffectiveness of toilet paper in the 16th century. The first commercially available toilet paper was invented by American entrepreneur Joseph Gayetty in 1857, with the dawning of the Second Industrial Revolution.

Elsewhere in Asia, water has been used for anal cleansing since ancient times, using methods such as Istinja in the Middle East, the lota vessel in the Indian subcontinent, and the tabo tool in Southeast Asia.

=== Facilities ===
Post-defecation facilities evolved with human civilization, and thus, so did post-defecation cleansing. According to Fernando, there is archeological evidence of toilet use in medieval Sri Lanka, ranging from the 6th-century Abhayagiri Complex in Anuradhapura; the 10th-century Pamsukulika Monastery in Ritigala, and the Baddhasimapasada and the Alahana Pirivena hospital complex in Polonnaruwa; to the 12th-century hospital toilet in Mihintale. These toilets were found to be with a complete system of plumbing and sewage with multi-stage treatment plants. According to Buddhism, toilet etiquettes (Wachchakutti Wattakkandaka in Pali language) were enumerated by Buddha himself in Tripitaka, the earliest collection of Buddhist teachings.

== Common methods ==
=== Washing ===
In countries that have predominantly Catholic, Eastern Orthodox, Hindu, Buddhist, or Islamic cultural traditions, water is usually used for anal cleansing. It is also practiced in some Protestant cultures, such as that of Finland. The cleaning process is typically done through either a pressurized device (e.g., a bidet or a bidet shower) or a non-pressurized vessel (e.g., a lota or an aftabeh) alongside a person's hand; many cultures assert that only the left hand is to be used for this task. Washing is sometimes followed by drying the cleaned areas with a cloth towel.

=== Wiping ===
In some parts of the developing world and in other areas where water may not always be usable, such as during camping trips, materials such as vegetable matter (leaves), mudballs, snow, corncobs, and stones are sometimes used for anal cleansing. Having hygienic means for anal cleansing available at the toilet or site of defecation is important for overall public health. The absence of proper materials in households can, under some circumstances, be correlated to the number of diarrhea episodes per household. The history of anal hygiene, from the Greco-Roman world to ancient China and ancient Japan, involves the widespread use of sponges and sticks as well as water and paper.

The inclusion of anal cleansing facilities is often overlooked in the design of public or shared toilets in developing countries. In most cases, materials for anal cleansing are not made available within those facilities. Ensuring safe disposal of anal cleansing materials is often overlooked, which can lead to unhygienic debris inside or surrounding public toilets that contributes to the spread of diseases.

== Cultural preferences ==
=== Water ===
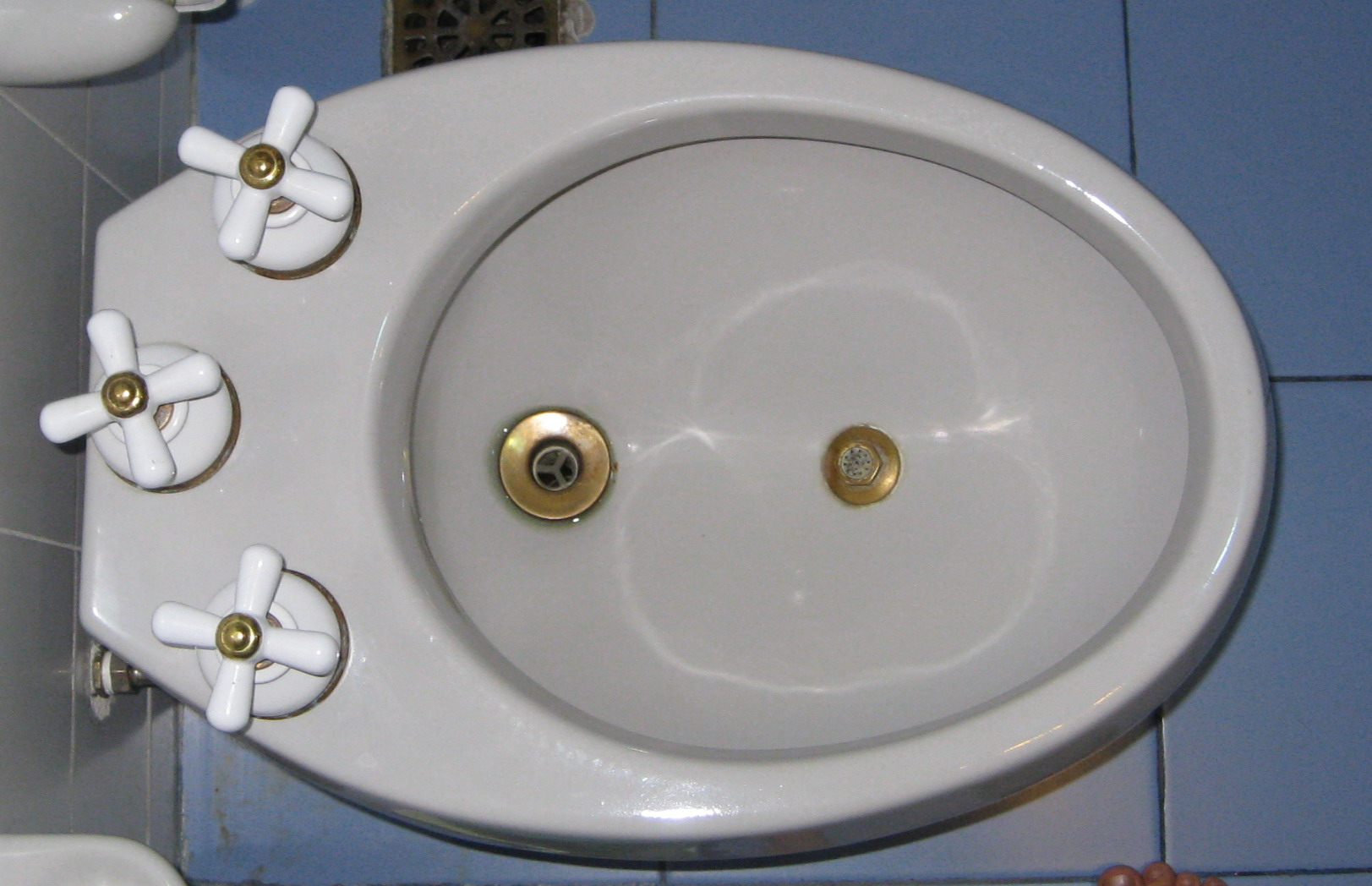
Top view of a bidet

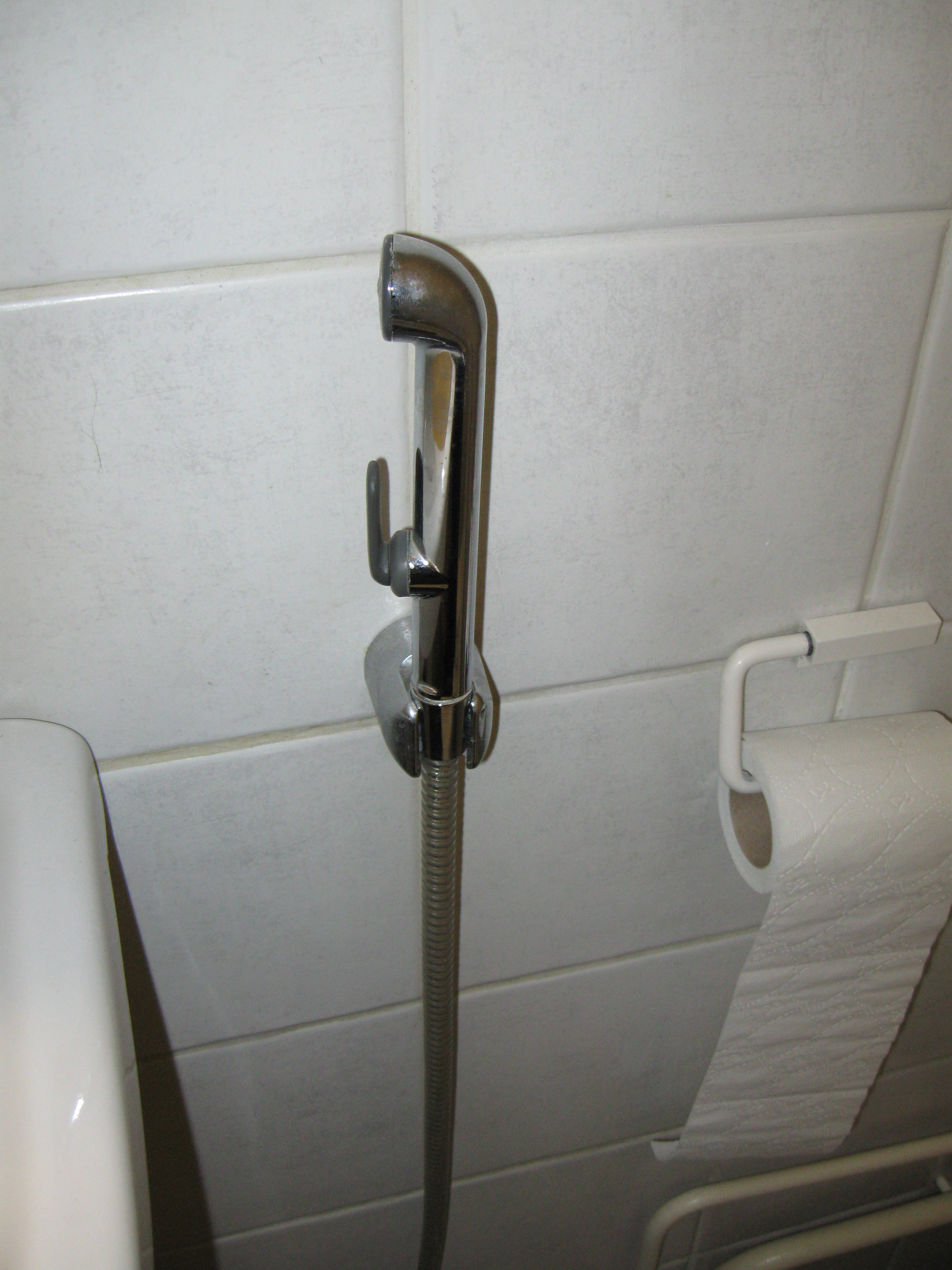
A bidet shower or "health faucet". It is commonly used in the Arab world and Asia.

Water with soap cleansing is a reliable and hygienic way of removing fecal remnants.

==== Muslim societies ====
The use of water in Muslim countries is due in part to Islamic toilet etiquette which encourages washing after all instances of defecation. There are flexible provisions for when water is scarce: stones or papers can be used for cleansing after defecation instead.

In Turkey, all Western-style toilets have a small nozzle on the centre rear of the toilet rim. This nozzle is called taharet musluğu and it is controlled by a small tap placed within hand's reach near the toilet. It is used to wet the hand to wash the anus. Wet toilet papers may also be used. Afterwards the anus is dried with toilet paper. Squat toilets in Turkey do not have this kind of nozzle (a small bucket of water from a hand's reach tap or a bidet shower is used instead).

Another alternative resembles a miniature shower and is known as a "health faucet", bidet shower, or "bum gun". It is commonly found to the right of the toilet where it is easy to reach. These are commonly used in the Muslim world. In India, a lota vessel is often used to cleanse with water, though the shower or nozzle is common among new toilets.

In the early 1990s, Rizwan Sajan and Anis Sajan based in Dubai founded the company Danube Group and began selling a handheld bidet shower called Shattaf. It soon became widespread across much of the Arab world and Asia.

==== Christian societies ====
The use of water in many Christian countries is due in part to the biblical toilet etiquette which encourages washing after all instances of defecation. The bidet is common in predominantly Catholic countries where water is considered essential for anal cleansing.

Some people in Europe and the Americas use bidets for anal cleansing with water. Bidets are common bathroom fixtures in many Western and Southern European countries and many South American countries, while bidet showers are more common in Finland and Greece. The availability of bidets varies widely within this group of countries. Furthermore, even where bidets exist, they may have other uses than for anal washing. In Italy, the installation of bidets in every household and hotel became mandatory by law on July 5, 1975.

==== East Asia ====
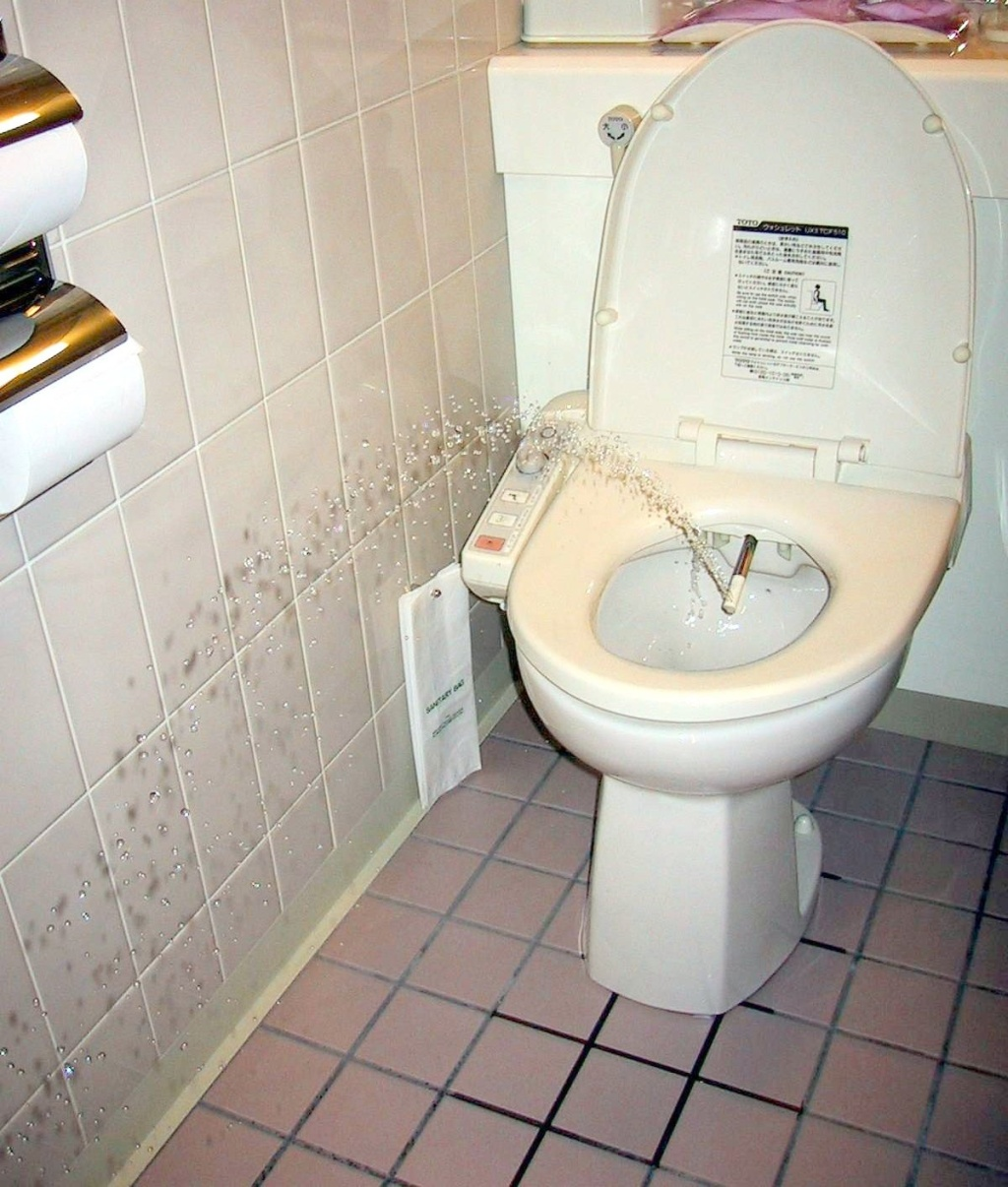
A Japanese toilet with integrated bidet spraying water for cleaning. The water jet is used to wash the anus and buttocks after defecation.

In Japan, the INAX Sanitarina 61 (1967) was the first commercial electronic bidet toilet with warm water spray and drying functions. The INAX Sanitarina F1 (1976) bidet toilet introduced a heated toilet seat. Between 1978 and 1980, TOTO developed the first washlet, the Washlet G. It featured warm water spray, heated seat and dryer functions.

In 1980, the "paperless" toilet seat was popularized in Japan. A spray toilet seat, commonly known by Toto's trademark Washlet, is typically a combination of seat warmer, bidet and drier, controlled by an electronic panel or remote control next to the toilet seat. A nozzle placed at rear of the toilet bowl aims a water jet to the anus and serves the purpose of cleaning. Many models have a separate "bidet" function aimed towards the front for vaginal cleansing. The spray toilet seat is common only in Western-style toilets, and is not incorporated in traditional style squat toilets. Some modern Japanese bidet toilets, especially in hotels and public areas, are labeled with pictograms to avoid language problems, and most newer models have a sensor that will refuse to activate the bidet unless someone is sitting on the toilet.

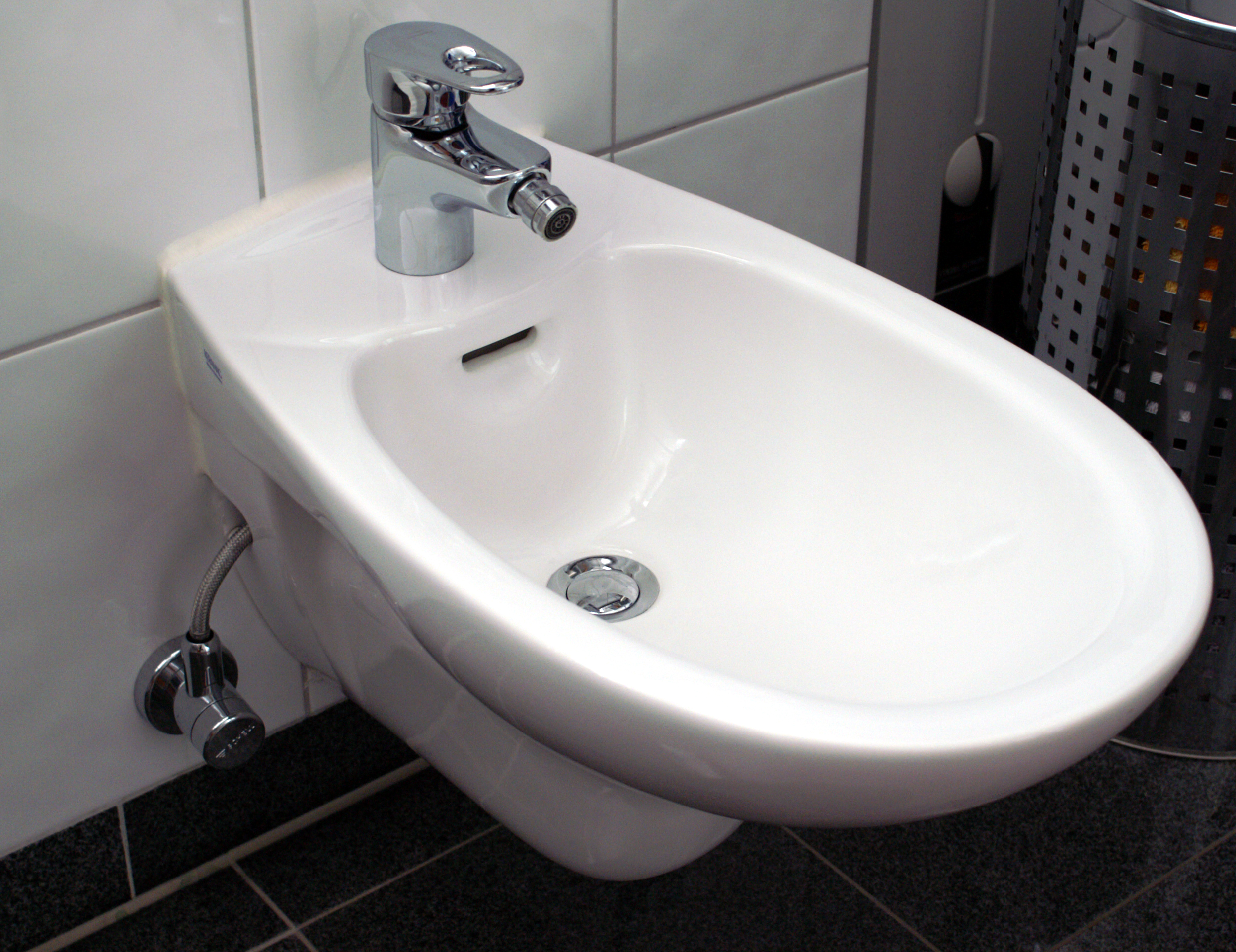
A modern bidet of the traditional type, available in many southern European and South American countries

==== Southeast Asia ====
In Southeast Asian countries such as Indonesia, the Philippines, Thailand, Brunei, Malaysia, and East Timor, house bathrooms usually have a medium size wide plastic dipper (called gayung in Indonesia, tabo in the Philippines, ขัน (khan) in Thai) or large cup, which is also used in bathing. In Thailand, the "bum gun" is ubiquitous. Some health faucets are metal sets attached to the bowl of the water closet, with the opening pointed at the anus. Toilets in public establishments mainly provide toilet paper for free or dispensed, though the dipper (often a cut up plastic bottle or small jug) is occasionally encountered in some establishments. Owing to its ethnic diversity, restrooms in Malaysia often feature a combination of anal cleansing methods where most public restrooms in cities offer toilet paper as well as a built in bidet or a small hand-held bidet shower (health faucets) connected to the plumbing in the absence of a built-in bidet.

In Vietnam, people often use a bidet shower. It is usually available both at general households and public places.

=== Toilet paper ===
==== Western world ====
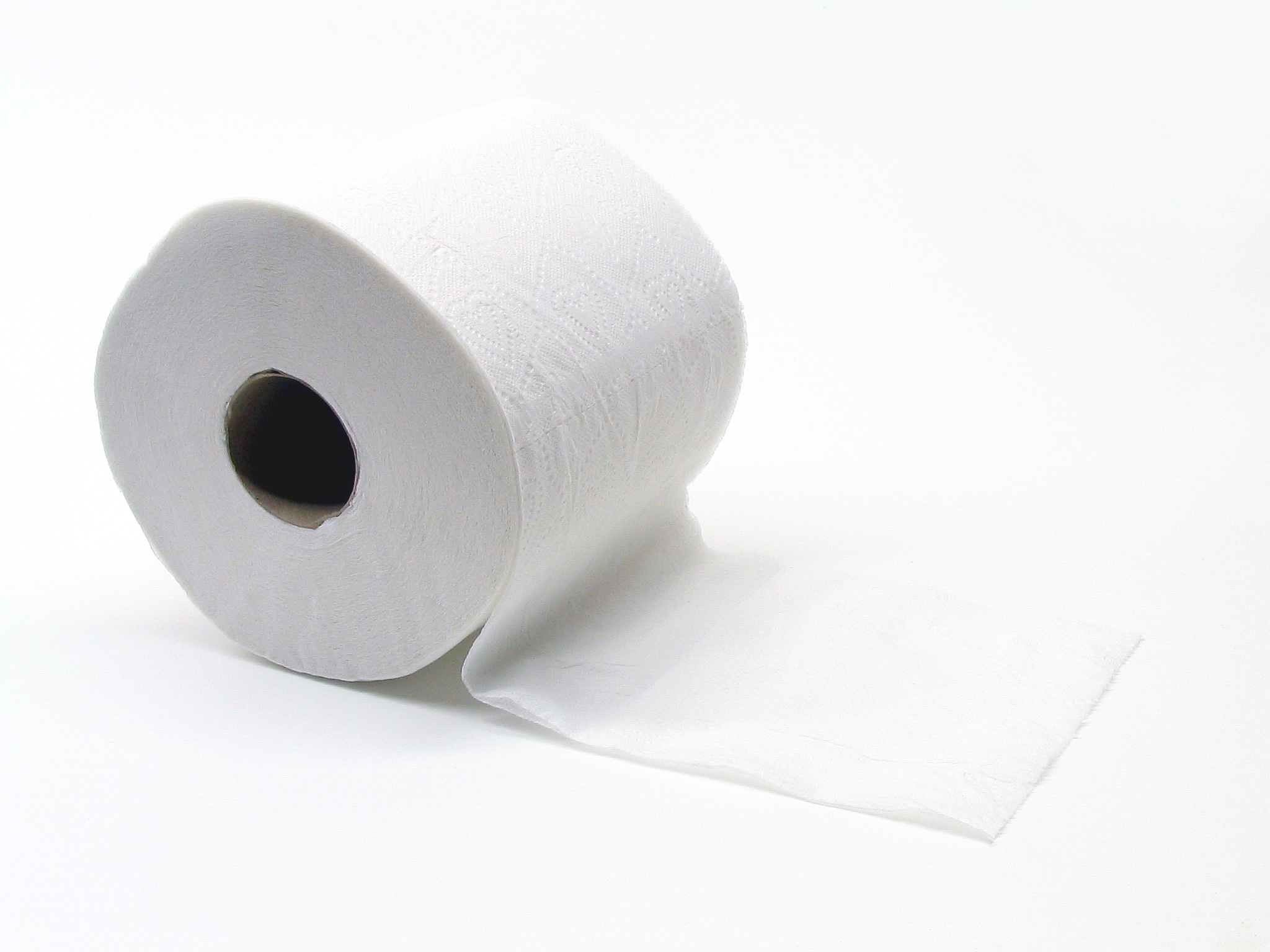
A roll of toilet paper

In some cultures—such as many Western countries—cleaning after defecation is generally done with toilet paper only, until the person can bathe or shower. Toilet paper is considered a very important household commodity in Western culture, as illustrated by the panic buying of toilet paper in many Western countries during the COVID-19 pandemic.

In some parts of the world, especially before toilet paper was available or affordable, the use of newspaper, telephone directory pages, or other paper products was common. In North America, the widely distributed Sears Roebuck catalog was also a popular choice until it began to be printed on glossy paper (at which point some people wrote to the company to complain). With flush toilets, using newspaper as toilet paper is likely to cause blockages.

This practice continues today in parts of Africa; while rolls of toilet paper are readily available, they can be fairly expensive, prompting poorer members of the community to use newspapers.

People suffering from hemorrhoids may find it more difficult to keep the anal area clean using only toilet paper and may prefer washing with water as well.

Although wiping from front to back minimizes the risk of contaminating the urethra, the directionality of wiping varies based on sex, personal preference, and culture.

Some people wipe their anal region standing while others wipe theirs sitting.

== Other methods and materials ==
=== Wet wipes and gel wipes ===
When cleaning babies' buttocks during diaper changes wet wipes are often used, in combination with water if available. As wet wipes are produced from plastic textiles made of polyester or polypropylene, they are notoriously bad for sewage systems as they do not decompose, although the wet wipe industry maintains they are biodegradable but not "flushable".

A product of the 21st century, special foams, sprays and gels can be combined with dry toilet paper as alternatives to wet wipes. A moisturizing gel can be applied to toilet paper for personal hygiene or to reduce skin irritation from diarrhea. This product is called gel wipe.

=== Pre-wipes ===
Novel pre-wipes and methods are disclosed for assisting in the cleaning of skin in the anal area. The pre-wipes comprise an anti-adherent formulation and are wiped across the anal region of a user prior to defecation to introduce a film of the anti-adherent formulation onto the anal region. This film reduces the amount of fecal material that is retained in the anal region after defecation and reduces the amount of cleanup required. This reduced amount of cleanup results in cleaner, healthier skin.

=== Natural materials ===
Stones, leaves, corn cobs and similar natural materials may also be used for anal cleansing.
