= Accessible housing =

Housing for people with disabilities

Accessible housing refers to the construction or modification (such as through renovation or home modification) of housing to enable independent living for persons with disabilities. Accessibility is achieved through architectural design, but also by integrating accessibility features such as modified furniture, shelves and cupboards, or even electronic devices in the home.

== Canada ==
In Canada, Flexhousing is a concept that encourages homeowners to make renovations that modify their house over time to meet changing accessibility needs. The concept supports the goals of enabling "homeowners to occupy a dwelling for longer periods of time, perhaps over their entire lifetimes, while adapting to changing circumstances and meeting a wide range of needs"; Universal Housing in the United States and Lifetime Homes in the United Kingdom are similar concepts.

== United Kingdom ==
Great Britain applies the most widespread application of home access to date. In 1999, Parliament passed Section M, an amendment to residential building regulations requiring basic access in all new homes, but even so in a survey by YouGov in 2019 only 21% of respondents said a wheelchair user would reasonably be able access all areas of their home.

== United States ==
In the United States, the 1988 Amendments to the Fair Housing Act added people with disabilities, as well as familial status, to the classes already protected by law from discrimination (race, color, gender, religion, creed, and country of origin). Among the protection for people with disabilities in the 1988 Amendments are seven construction requirements for all multifamily buildings of more than four units first occupied after March 13, 1991. These seven requirements are as follows:

1. An accessible building entrance on an accessible route,
2. Accessible common and public use areas,
3. Doors usable by a person in a wheelchair,
4. Accessible route into and through the dwelling unit,
5. Light switches, electrical outlets, thermostats and other environmental controls in accessible locations,
6. Reinforced walls in bathrooms for later installation of grab bars, and
7. Usable kitchens and bathrooms.

Access is typically defined within the limits of what a person sitting in a wheelchair is able to reach with arm movement only, with minimal shifting of the legs and torso. Lighting and thermostat controls should not be above and power outlets should not be below the reach of a person in a wheelchair.

Sinks and cooking areas typically need to be designed without cupboards below them, to permit the legs of the wheelchair user to roll underneath, and countertops may be of reduced height to accommodate a sitting rather than standing user. In some cases two food preparation areas may be combined into a single kitchen to permit both standing and wheelchair users.

In spite of these advancements, the housing types where most people in the United States reside – single-family homes – are not covered by the Americans with Disabilities Act, the Fair Housing Act, or any other federal law with the exception of the small percentage of publicly funded homes impacted by Section 504 of the Rehabilitation Act. As a result, the great majority of new single-family homes replicate the barriers in existing homes.

== Renovations for accessibility ==
Homeowners may be challenged by the need to find renovators familiar with accessible design issues. The federal government of Canada and the provincial governments work jointly to share the cost of offering reimbursement programs for homeowners in need of house renovations for accessibility. These programs improve the ability of homeowners to fund house modifications, through renovating existing houses.

== Adaptations and accommodations ==
Many ranch style homes and manufactured homes use a main floor slightly raised above ground level, but have an overall flat layout with either a crawlspace or slightly raised basement below for plumbing, electrical, and heating systems. These homes can be relatively easily modified to accommodate wheelchairs and walkers, with the installation of a long low-rise ramp outside the building, up to the house entrance, placed over the existing stairway. This ramp can then be removed at a later time, reverting to the stairway entrance if the handicapped access is no longer necessary.

Split level homes tend to be designed with multiple internal stairways and half-floor landings inside the building. There may be an entrance area inside the building at ground level, with stairs inside the entrance that immediately go up and down from the ground level. These homes are difficult to accommodate inexpensively since there is often no space available inside the structure to install long sloping wheelchair ramps to access the various floors. It may be possible to retrofit stair lifts into the stairwells or wheelchair lifts into balconies near the stairwell.

Multi-story homes can sometimes be accommodated by installing a private residential elevator, which is usually much less expensive and has fewer design and layout requirements than a full commercial elevator. Homebuilders can in some cases plan for a future residential elevator by designing closet spaces in each floor stacked vertically with the same dimensions and location. At a later time the closet floors and ceilings are removed and the elevator equipment is installed into the open shaft.

Below are some current suggested architectural features of a universally-accessible house:

Kitchen	Hallways and stairways	Living room / Family room	Bathroom
A side-opening, wall-mounted oven with a pullout board beneath	Hallways should be 1,200 mm (3.9 ft) wide	A doorless entry with no threshold	The bathroom door should be a minimum of 865 mm (34.1 in) wide and open outward to avoid obstructing the limited space inside
Pull-out work boards at varying heights	Stairs should be 1 metre (39 inches) wide and a maximum of 280 mm (11 in) deep	A uniform level throughout the room eliminates abrupt changes that can create trip hazards	Dual lever faucets are easier to use than single lever or ball-type faucets
Knee space left under the sink or a cooktop	The maximum riser height should be 180 mm (7.1 in)	The installation of extra electrical, telephone and cable outlets accommodates technology and provides for maximum flexibility in furniture arrangement	Install non-slip flooring for any area that is prone to getting wet
Pull-out drawers for storage rather than deep shelves	Flights of stairs should be straight with the same number of steps in each flight with a minimum of three and maximum of twelve risers	Light switches should be accessible from a sitting position and one switch should be located at the entrance to the living room	Leave free space on at least one side of the toilet for improved access

== Aging in place and accessibility ==
A growing trend among senior citizens is to "age in place", reflecting a desire to retain independence for as long as possible. Adaptations for seniors take into account the most common physical impairments affecting the elderly. For example, a common cause of serious injury for seniors is falling inside the home. U.S. Centers for Disease Control and Prevention:

- Falls are the leading cause of fatal injury and the most common cause of nonfatal trauma-related hospital admissions among older adults.
- Falls result in more than 2.8 million injuries treated in emergency departments annually, including over 800,000 hospitalizations and more than 27,000 deaths.
- In 2015, the total cost of fall injuries was $50 billion. Medicare and Medicaid shouldered 75% of these costs.
- The financial toll for older adult falls is expected to increase as the population ages and may reach $67.7 billion by 2020.
- Bathrooms commonly are believed to be a particularly hazardous location.

Adding handrails and grab bars throughout the home, particularly in bathrooms and along stairways, helps reduce the risk of falling. Other adaptations that improve accessibility for seniors include: easy-to-reach work and storage areas in the kitchen; reaching devices to grab objects on high shelves; lever handles on doors; accessible toilets; toilet seat risers; walk-in showers; and bathtub and shower seats.

=== Alzheimer disease and housing adaptations ===
Alzheimer disease presents specific challenges for caregivers, who need to make the home as accessible as possible to the elderly resident, while keeping safety features in mind. Removable stove switch knobs, locks on kitchen cabinets, electric kettles with automatic shut-off, and adding lighting to eliminate shadows in the house can all help caregivers to reduce dangers to the person with Alzheimer disease. Other features that can improve the well-being of the elderly person can include marking doors with conspicuous and distinct signs or objects such as ribbons or wreaths, can assist memory. Adding a cot or bed to the main floor of the house to allow the elderly person to rest without climbing stairs to a bedroom can be helpful to the Alzheimer patient. Furniture and clutter can also be removed to make the house more safe for an elderly person inclined to pace or wander.

== See also ==
- Accessible bathtub
- Accessible toilet
- Americans with Disabilities Act of 1990
- Bathroom emergency pullstring
- Grab bar
- Transfer bench
- Unisex public toilet
- Visitability
