= Accessible bathtub =

Type of bathtub

Accessible bathtubs are bathtubs that can be used by people with limited mobility, disabilities, and the elderly. A bathtub can be made accessible for some people by the addition of grab bars or hand grips, or through the use of lifts that lower and raise the bather in the water. Other bathtubs have been specially designed for accessibility. These may include walk-in bathtubs, tubs with built-in transfer benches, or, more recently, tubs with raised beds and sliding doors to allow for a seated transfer.

Many accessible bathtubs are available with hydrotherapy or whirlpool features, internal grab bars, anti-slip floors and seats, and handheld showerheads that, in some cases, can also be wall mounted to enable a person to take a standing shower.

== Walk-in bathtubs ==
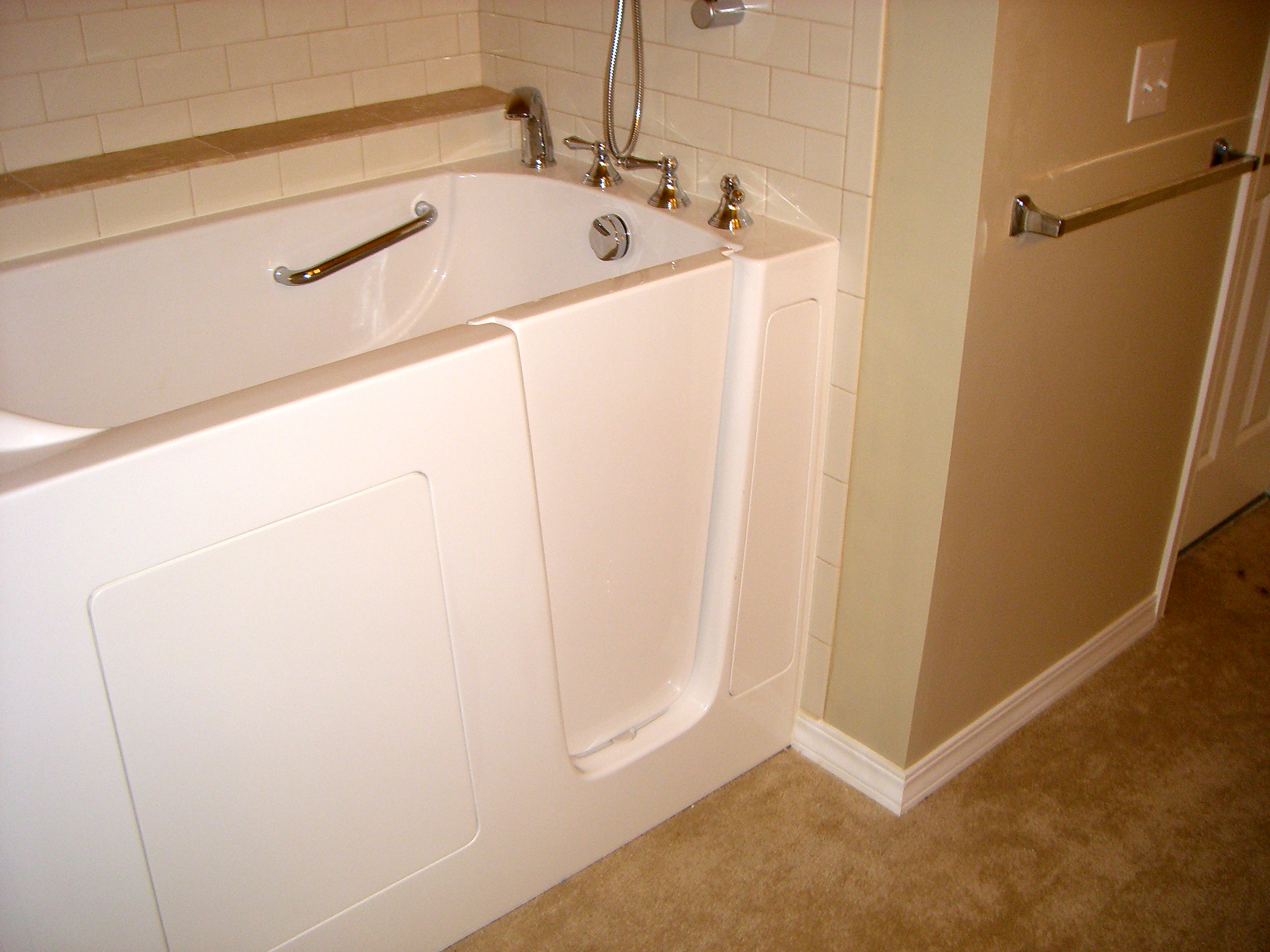
A walk-in bathtub.

Walk-in bathtubs have either an inward-opening or cap-like fitted door, descending to near ground level to allow a person to enter the tub without climbing over its side; the door is self-sealing. Most walk-in bathtubs also have a chair-height seat, but some, which are the same basic configuration as a standard bathtub, do not have any seat. In some instances an inward-opening door may be considered a disadvantage because emergency access is impossible, since the pressure of the water on the door is holding it closed. However, the advantage is that an inward opening door is "self-sealing" due to the pressure of the water inside the bath assisting in maintaining a water-tight seal. Outward-swinging doors are equipped with a special seal so that they will not leak. These types of doors also facilitate access for users who need to perform a lateral transfer from a wheelchair in order to gain access to the bathing area. Other tubs have side walls that raise and lower, while others have doors that slide into the wall of the tub.

Some bathtubs categorized as "walk-in" actually require a low step-in, as they have higher seats and outward-opening doors that enable a person to simply sit on the seat and pivot and swing his or her legs into the tub. This type of walk-in bathtub can be helpful to wheelchair users and to others with mobility impairments.

Walk-in tubs take up a similar amount of space in a bathroom as a traditional bathtub. This allows for a quicker installation and simpler alignment of the water drains.

There are also smaller walk-in tubs that offer front and side entry for a less-than-standard space.

== See also ==
- Accessible housing
- Accessible toilet
- Americans with Disabilities Act of 1990
- Bathroom emergency pullstring
- Grab bar
- Transfer bench
- Visitability
