= Accessible toilet =

Toilets designed for disabled users

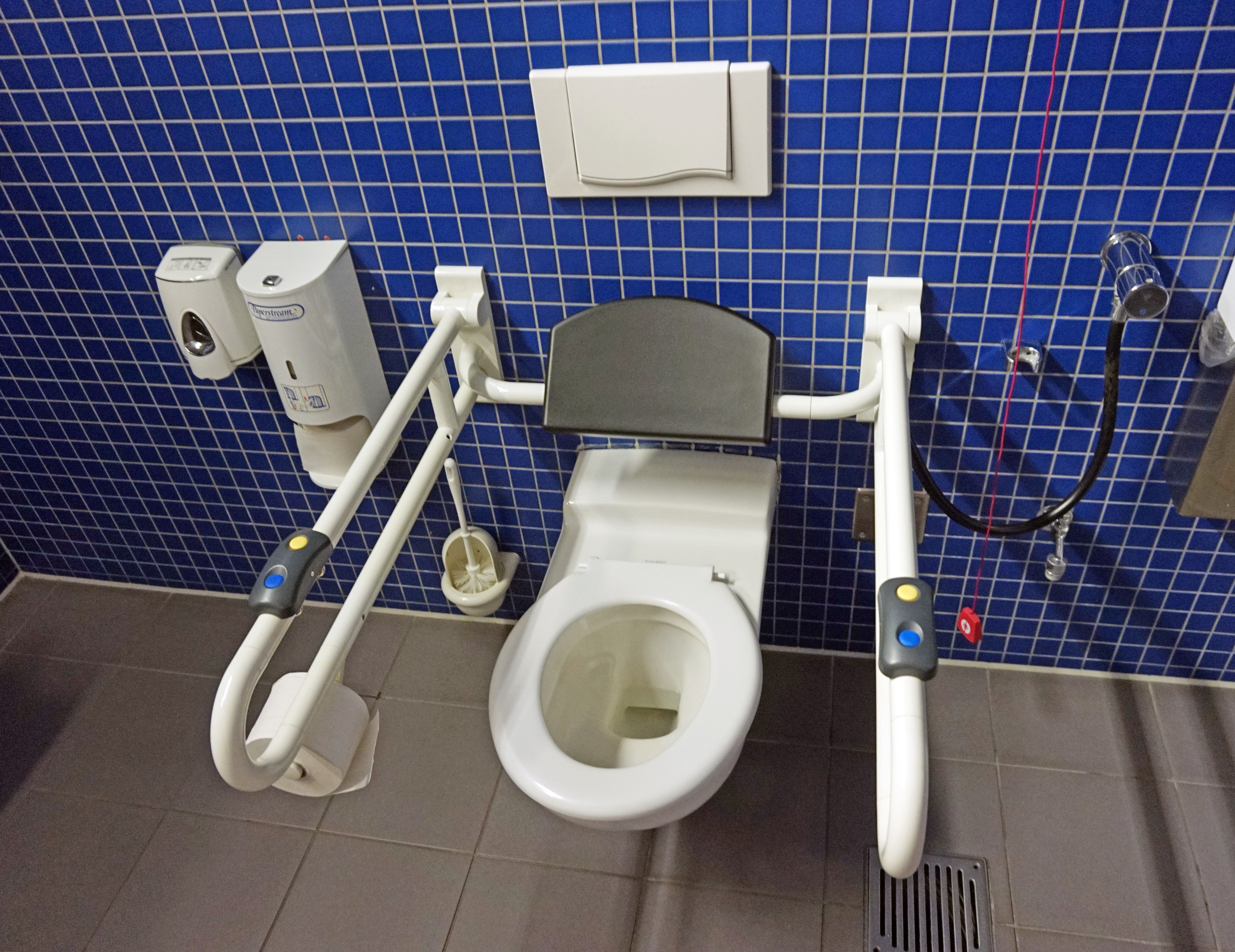
Accessible public toilet at airport in Munich.

Accessible toilets are toilets that have been specially designed to better accommodate people with physical disabilities. Persons with reduced mobility find them useful, as do those with weak legs, as a higher toilet bowl makes it easier for them to stand up. Additional measures that can be taken to add accessibility to a toilet include providing more space, adding grab bars to ease transfer to and from the toilet seat, and providing extra room for a caregiver if necessary. Some countries have requirements concerning the accessibility of public toilets. Toilets in private homes can be modified (retrofitted) to increase accessibility.

== Description ==
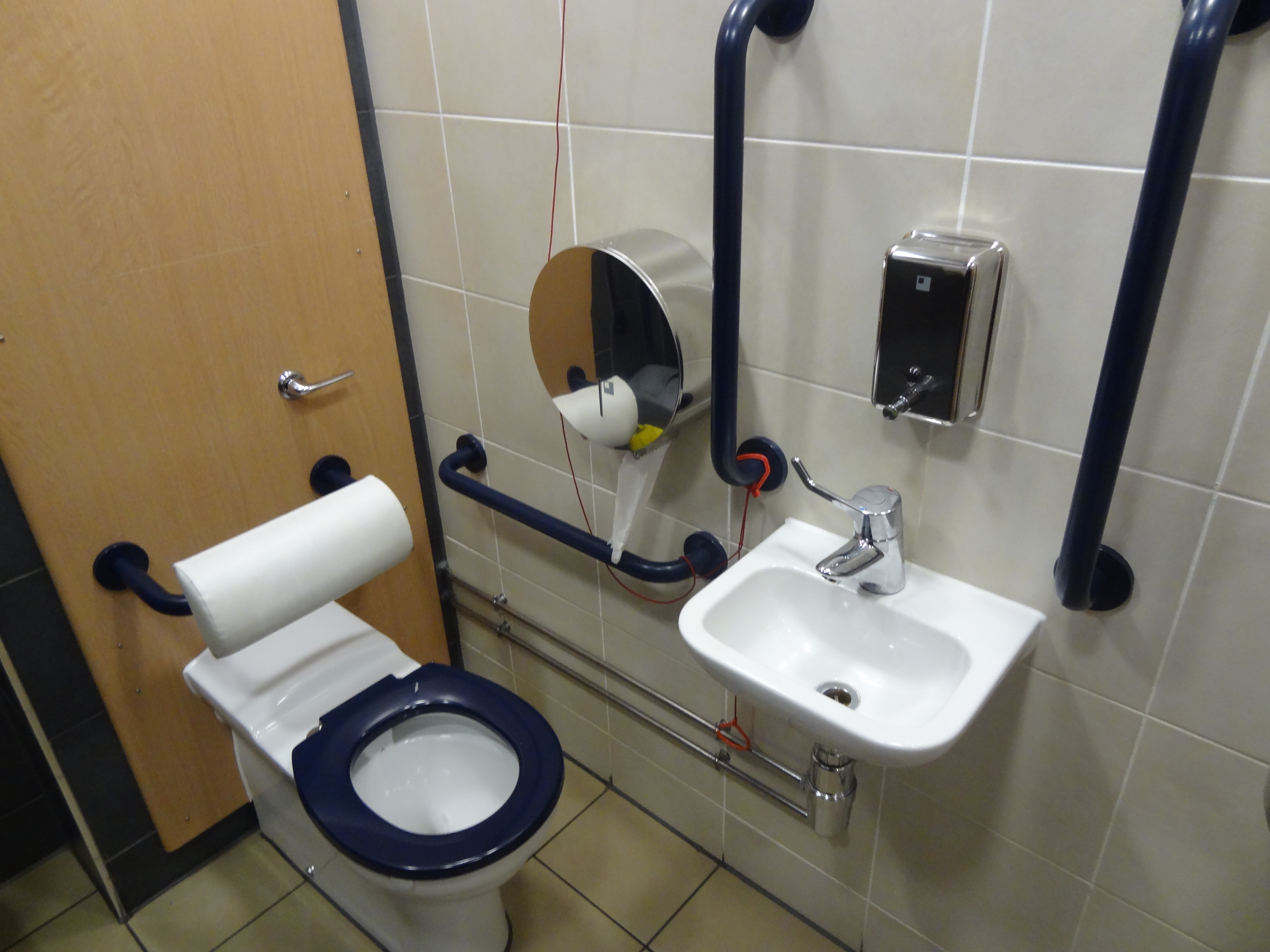
An accessible toilet at a McDonald's restaurant with the alarm cord tied within reach

Public toilets (a.k.a. restrooms) can present accessibility challenges for people with disabilities. For example, stalls may not be able to fit a wheelchair, and transferring between the wheelchair and the toilet seat may pose a challenge. Accessible toilets are designed to address these issues by providing more space and bars for users to grab and hold during transfers, and space for an assistant if necessary.

Toilets in private homes can be modified to increase accessibility; this is one of the skills of an occupational therapist. Common modifications include: adding a raised toilet seat on top of a standard toilet, installing a taller and more convenient height toilet bowl, attaching a frame or grab bars, and ensuring the toilet paper is within reach and can be detached with one hand. These modifications can enable aging in place for seniors who wish to remain in their homes and communities.

=== Terminology ===
An alternative term is "handicapped toilet" which is no longer recommended (see disability).

== Technical designs ==
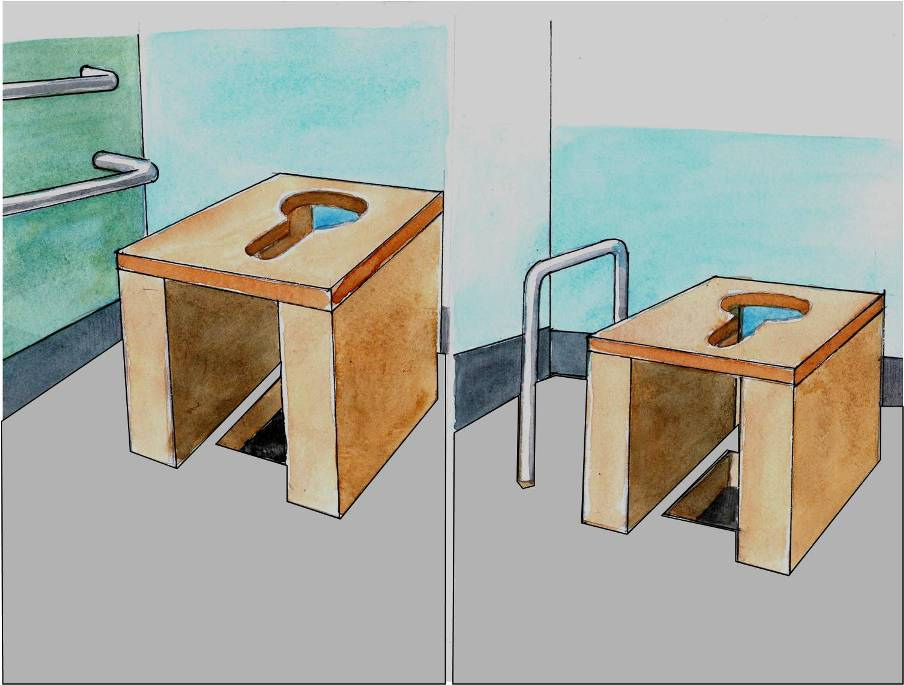
A moveable wood seat with support bars, that can be placed over the drop hole of a pit latrine. Tanzania.

The U.S. Department of Justice published revised regulations for Titles II and III of the Americans with Disabilities Act of 1990 "ADA" in the Federal Register on September 15, 2010. These regulations adopted revised, enforceable accessibility standards called the 2010 ADA Standards for Accessible Design "2010 Standards" or "Standards". The 2010 Standards set minimum requirements – both scoping and technical – for newly designed and constructed or altered State and local government facilities, public accommodations, and commercial facilities to be readily accessible to and usable by individuals with disabilities. According to ADA, the height of the toilet bowl shall be 17 inches (430 mm) at a minimum when measured from the floor to the top of the toilet seat. Flush controls shall be hand operated or automatic mounted on the wide side of the toilet area and easily reached and operated. Additionally, there is the important ADA requirement of clear floor space at water closet rooms. The following recommendations are becoming more common in public toilet facilities, as part of a trend towards universal design:

- a wheelchair-height toilet, to help the user on and off the toilet, with handles (grab bars);
- a bathroom emergency pullstring, in the form of a red cord that reaches the ground, connected to a buzzer and a flashing red light;
- a wheelchair-height sink and hand dryer;
- a wheelchair-width door;
- additional options to upgrade a toilet are pit latrines that include a moveable wood seat with support bars.

Accessible toilets need larger floor space than other cubicles to allow space for a wheelchair to maneuver. This space is also useful for people who are not necessarily wheelchair users, but still need physical support from someone else. A wheelchair-height changing table is also recommended, but remains rarely available. Accessible changing tables are low and accessible to a wheelchair user, and long enough for a caretaker to change an older child or adult with a disability.

=== Examples ===
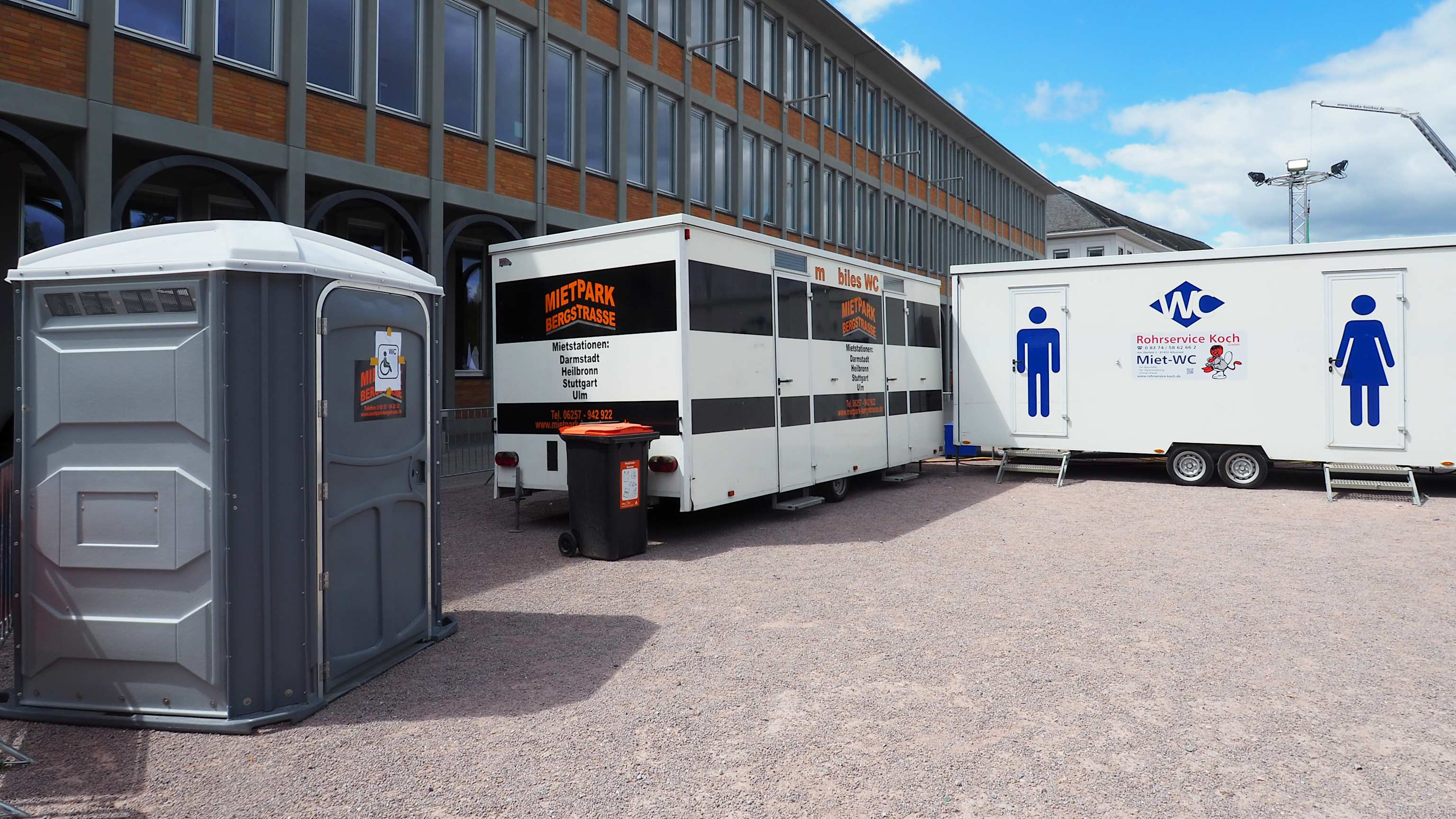
Combining accessibility and portability is difficult. Here, sewerage connected toilet wagons are complemented by an accessible chemical toilet cabin.

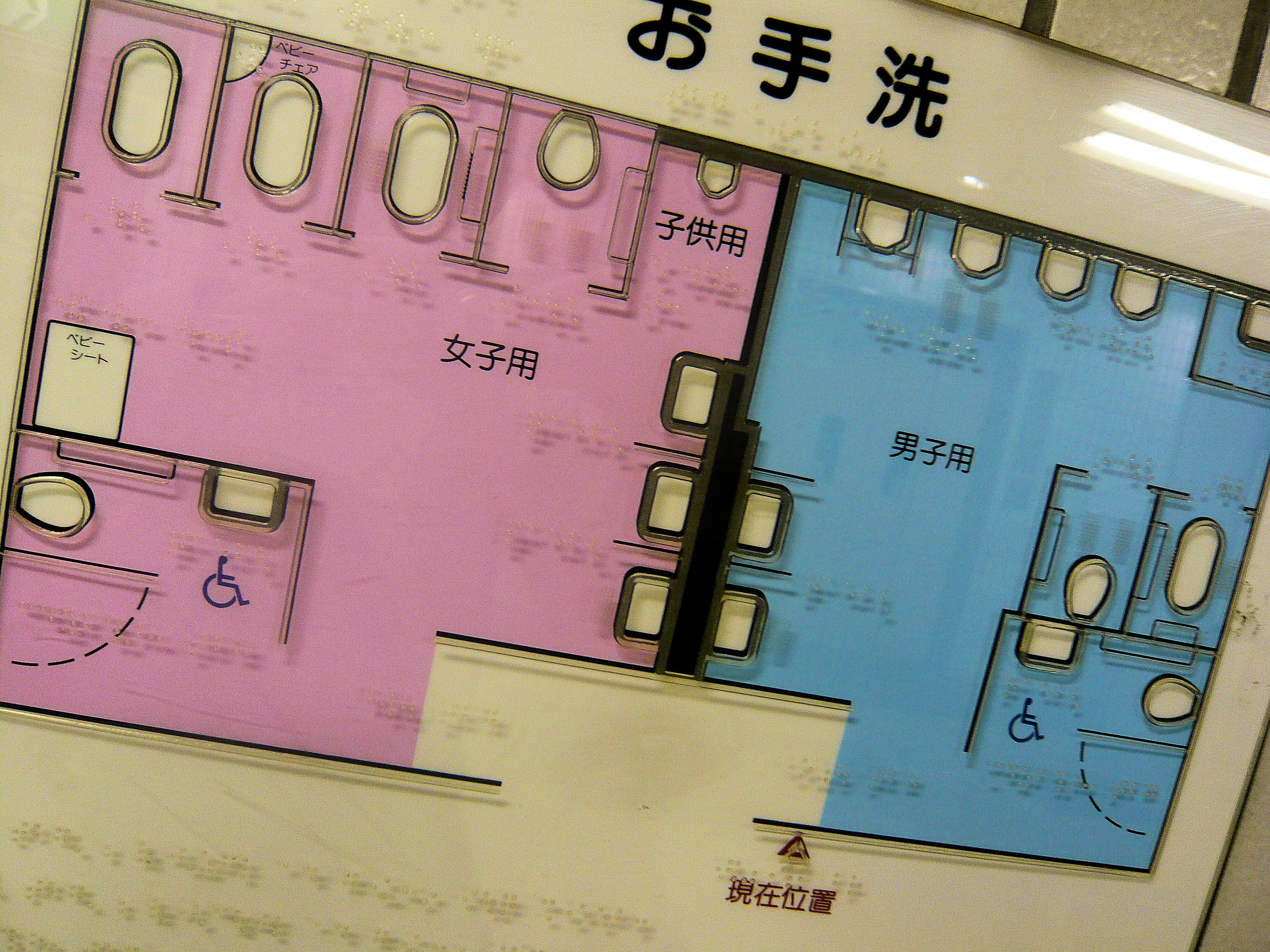
A sign with a braille map for a public toilet in Kyoto, Japan. Colours are used to designate sex segregation.

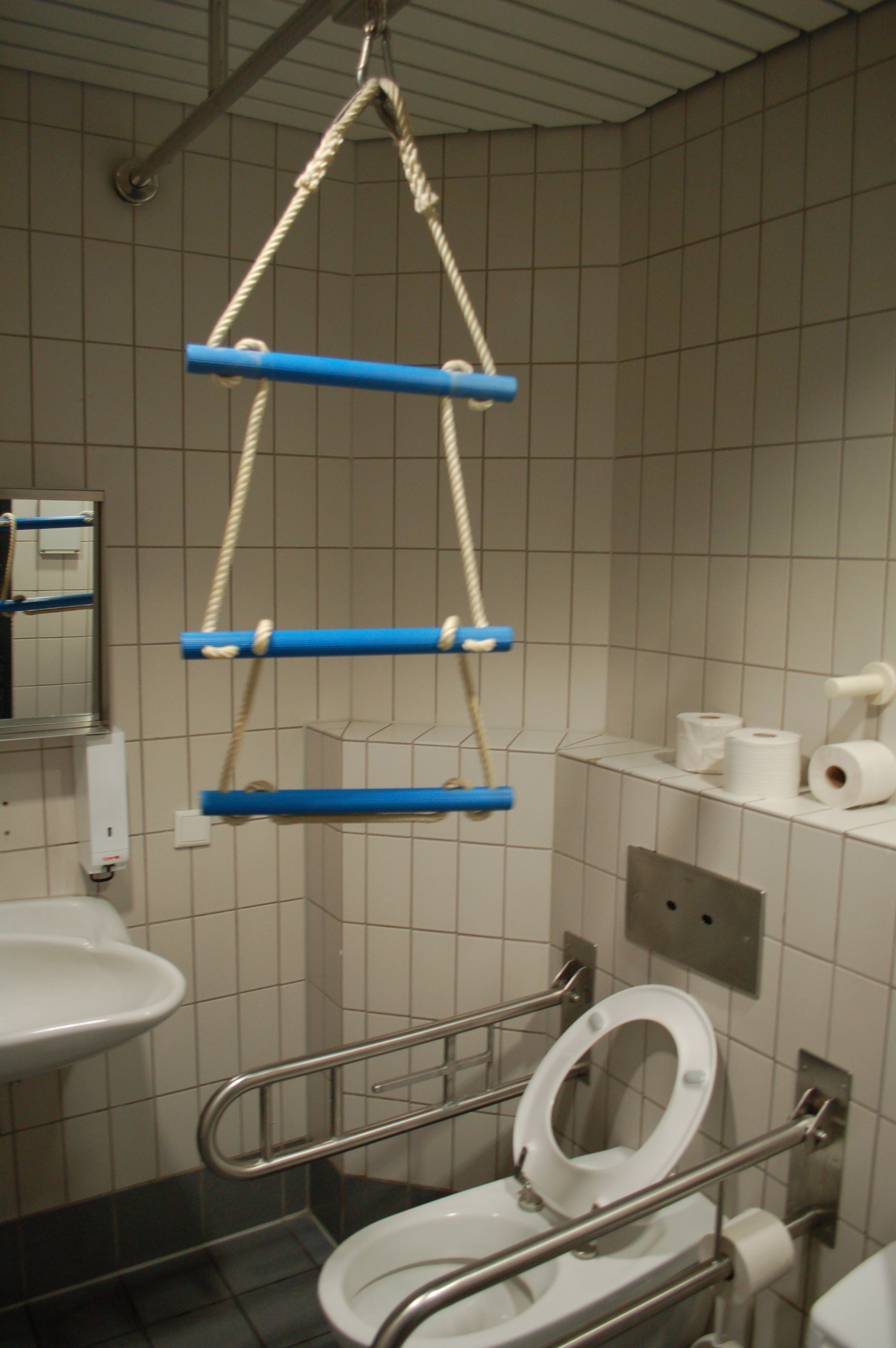
Overhead mobile support bars in an accessible public toilet in Frankfurt, Germany.

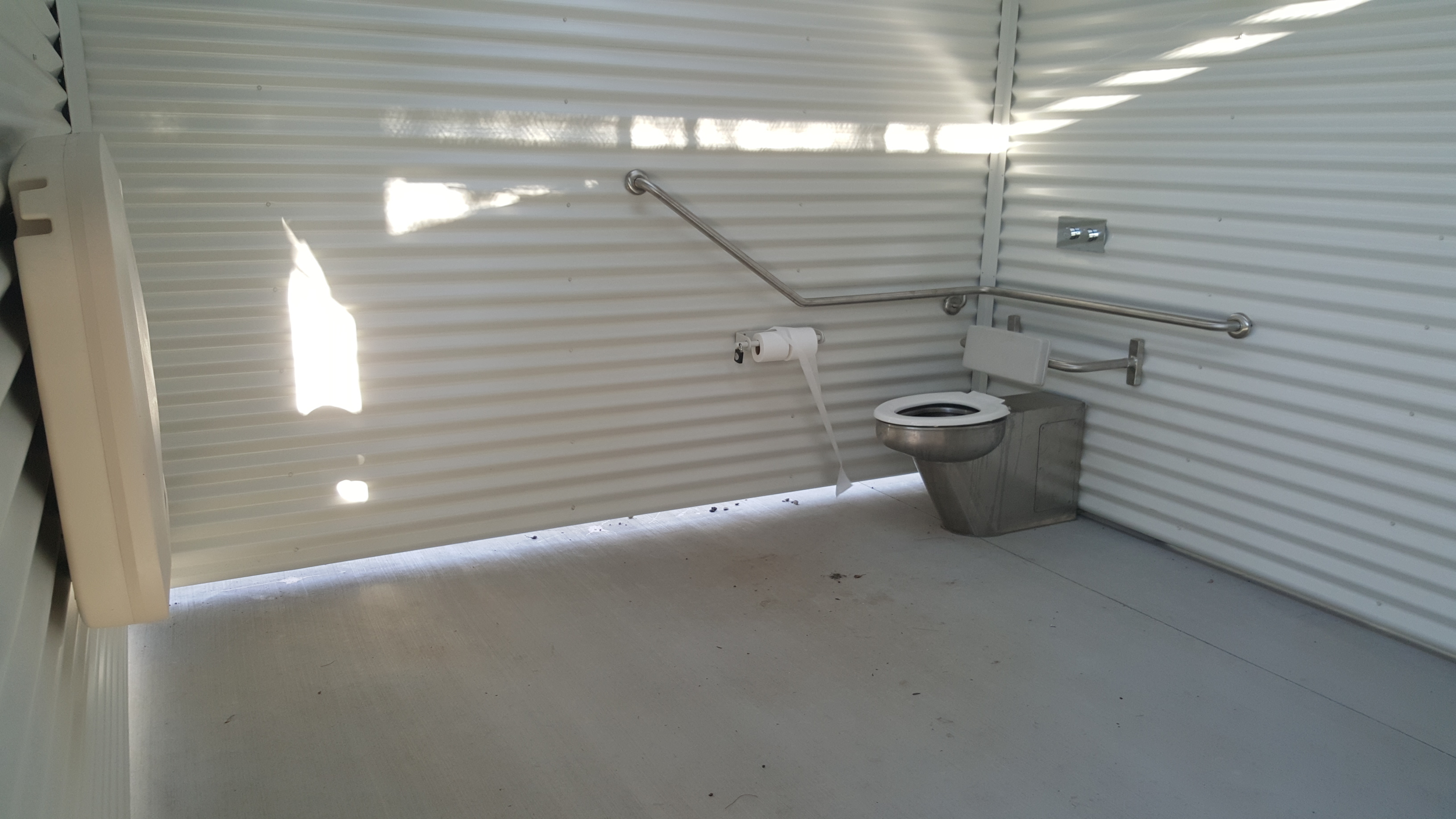
A public toilet for use with a wheelchair at a park in the Brisbane suburb of Wishart

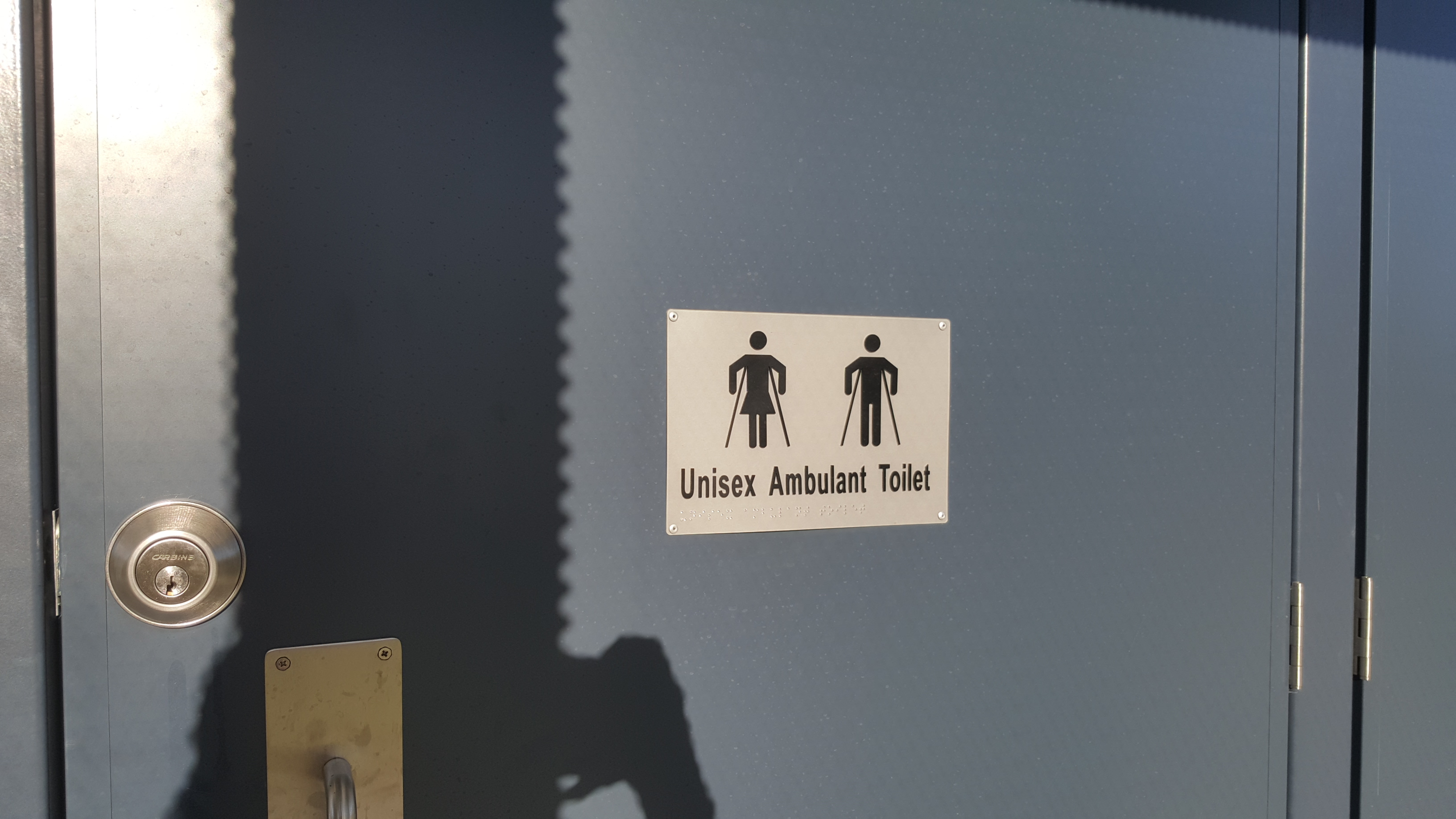
Sign on toilet door to indicate accessible toilet for ambulant use (with grab bars but not for wheelchair users) in Brisbane

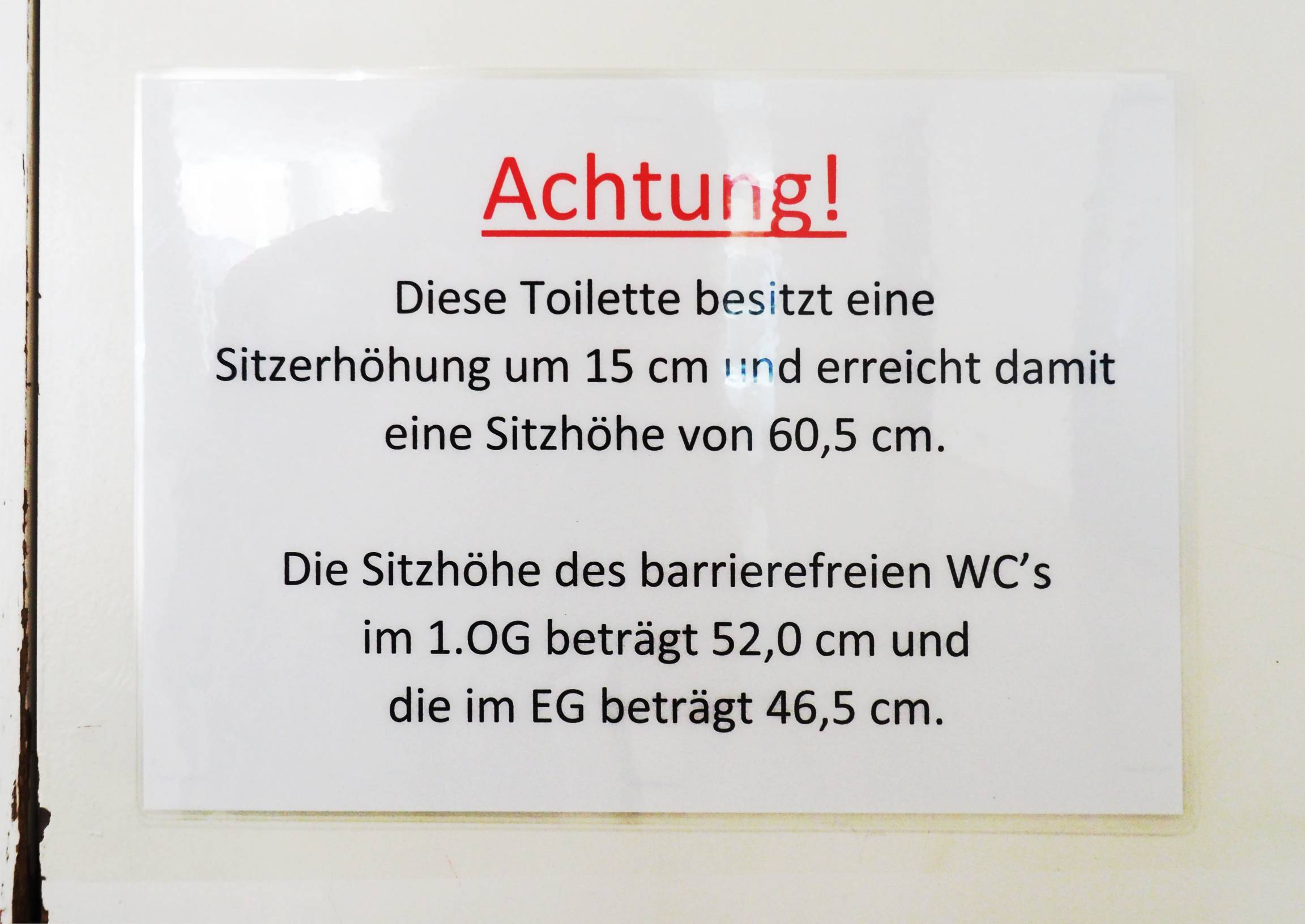
A sign announces three toilets with specified different seat heights.

== Society and culture ==
=== Legislation ===
Some countries have requirements concerning the accessibility of public toilets. In the United Kingdom, the Equality Act 2010 requires organizations and businesses to make reasonable adjustments to meet the needs of people with disabilities. In the United States, most new construction for public use must be built to Americans with Disabilities Act of 1990 standards.

=== Locks and universal keys ===
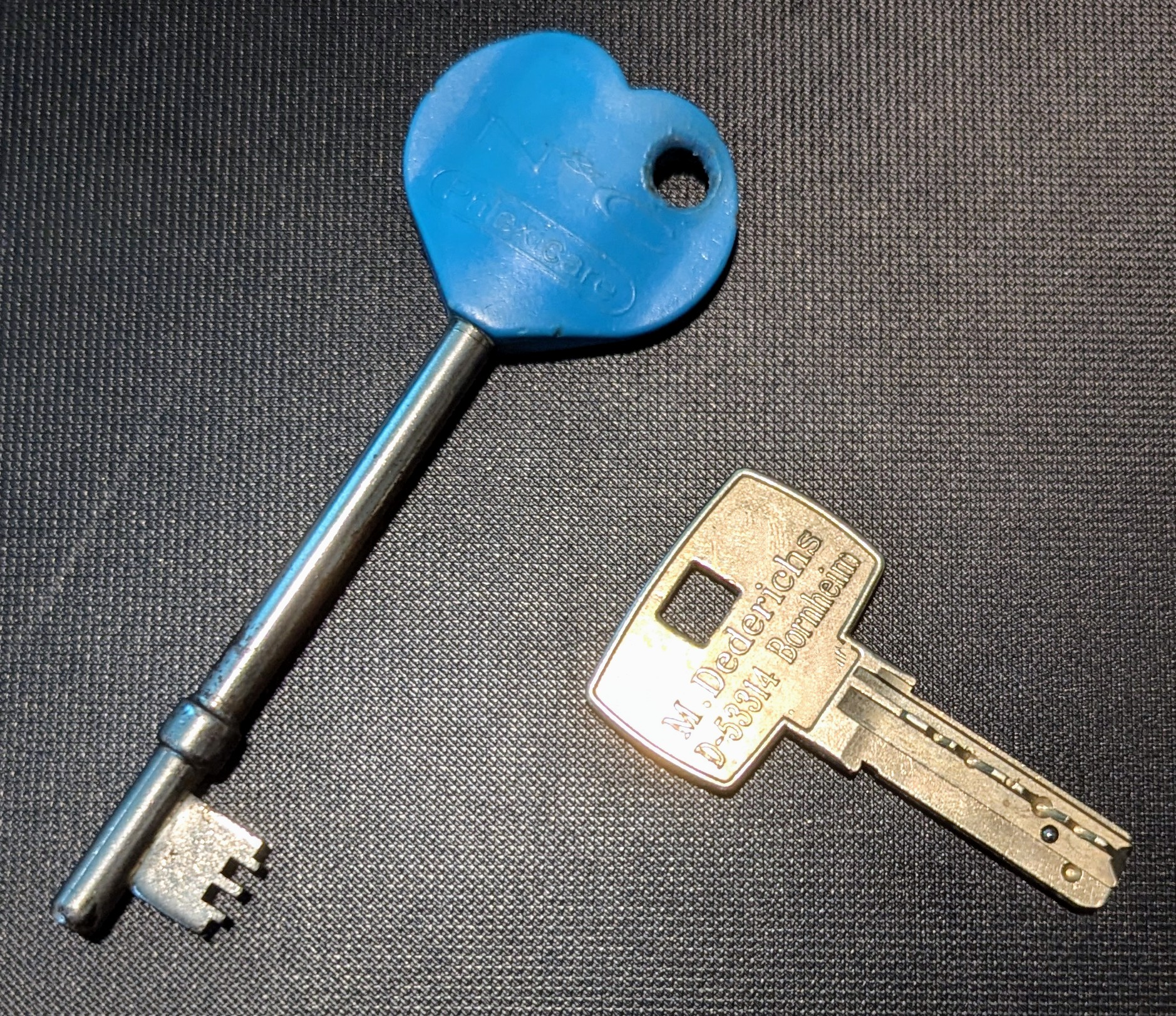
Two types of keys used in Europe to unlock accessible toilets - the RADAR key (left) and the Euro key (right).

Some countries and regions have a scheme of standardised locks, with non-profit organisations selling keys to disabled people. For example, to access many accessible toilets in the United Kingdom, disabled people can purchase a RADAR key from Disability Rights UK, and across parts of mainland Europe there exists the Euro key scheme, which is also used for other disabled facilities.

== See also ==
- Accessible bathtub
- Accessible housing
- Potty parity
- Transfer bench
- Unisex public toilet
- Visitability, proposed design standards for all new housing
- Changing Places (campaign)
