= TPI =

TPI may refer to:

== Medicine ==
- Tehran Psychiatric Institute, an Iranian research institute
- Tianyin Pharmaceutical, a Chinese pharmaceutical company
- TPI test, used to detect presence of Treponema pallidum bacteria
- Triosephosphate isomerase, an enzyme

== Technology ==
- Tire Pressure Indicator, a product by NIRA Dynamics AB
- TPI Specialties, an American auto parts manufacturer
- True Performance Index, a measurement for AMD processors
- Teeth per inch, on a saw blade
- Thermoplastic polyimide, a type of plastic

== Units of measure ==
- Thread count, or threads per inch, used in the textile industry
- Threads per inch, used with threaded fasteners
- Tracks per inch, of magnetic storage media
- Twist per inch, or turns per inch, used in the textile industry

== Other uses ==
- MNCTV, an Indonesian television network formerly named TPI (Televisi Pendidikan Indonesia)
- Tangail Polytechnic Institute, in Bangladesh
- Tapini Airport, in Papua New Guinea
- Tarup-Paarup IF, a Danish association football club
- Ted Petty Invitational, an independent wrestling tournament in North America
- The Post Internazionale, an Italian magazine
- Tibet Policy Institute, a think tank of the Central Tibetan Administration
- Tok Pisin, a language of Papua New Guinea
- Town Planning Institute, later the Royal Town Planning Institute, a professional organisation in the United Kingdom
- TPI Polene, a Thai cement manufacturer
- TPI theory, in human resource management
- Trading Places International, an American vacation services corporation
- Triebold Paleontology Incorporated, an American fossil company
- Tube Products of India, an Indian steel manufacturer
- Two person integrity, a communications security measure
