= Trading Places (disambiguation) =

Trading Places is a 1983 comedy film directed by John Landis and starring Dan Aykroyd and Eddie Murphy.

Trading Places may also refer to:

- "Trading Places" (song), a song by American R&B singer Usher
- Trading Places International, an American vacation and timeshare company

== Film and television ==
- The Absent-Minded Professor: Trading Places, a 1989 television film first aired on The Magical World of Disney

=== Television episodes ===
- "Chip & AJ Trading Places", Overhaulin' season 4, episode 7 (2006)
- "Trading Places", All Grown Up! season 5, episode 3 (2007)
- "Trading Places", Baby Talk season 1, episode 4 (1991)
- "Trading Places", Barney & Friends season 5, episode 5 (1998)
- "Trading Places", Baywatch season 4, episode 21 (1994)
- "Trading Places", Cagney & Lacey season 7, episode 11 (1988)
- "Trading Places", Claude's Crib episode 3 (1997)
- "Trading Places", Cousin Skeeter season 3, episode 6 (2001)
- "Trading Places", Cyberchase season 1, episode 20 (2002)
- "Trading Places", Day by Day (American) season 2, episode 3 (1988)
- "Trading Places", Down to Earth (American) season 3, episode 17 (1985)
- "Trading Places", The Dudley Do-Right Show season 3, episode 11 (1959)
- "Trading Places", Family Guy season 9, episode 13 (2011)
- "Trading Places", Family Matters season 9, episode 8 (1997)
- "Trading Places", Groove High episode 17 (2012)
- "Trading Places", Hangin' with Mr. Cooper season 2, episode 18 (1994)
- "Trading Places", Happy Family: Conditions Apply episode 8 (2023)
- "Trading Places", Hoopla Doopla! episode 24 (2014)
- "Trading Places", It's Like, You Know... season 2, episode 13 (2000)
- "Trading Places", Littlest Pet Shop season 1, episode 14 (2013)
- "Trading Places", My Secret Identity season 3, episode 2 (1990)
- "Trading Places", Odd Squad season 1, episode 25a (2015)
- "Trading Places", PB&J Otter season 3, episode 15b (2000)
- "Trading Places", Peep and the Big Wide World season 4, episode 5a (2010)
- "Trading Places", Pixel Pinkie series 2, episode 5 (2012)
- "Trading Places", Power Rangers Super Samurai episode 3 (2012)
- "Trading Places", Ricky Zoom season 1, episode 18 (2020)
- "Trading Places", Saving Hope season 3, episode 14 (2015)
- "Trading Places", So Little Time episode 22 (2002)
- "Trading Places", Step by Step season 3, episode 5 (1993)
- "Trading Places", The Apprentice (American) season 1, episode 5 (2004)
- "Trading Places", The Charmings season 2, episode 7 (1987)
- "Trading Places", The Family Man (American) episode 14 (1991)
- "Trading Places", The Jeffersons season 10, episode 15 (1984)
- "Trading Places", The Parkers season 1, episode 16 (2000)
- "Trading Places", VeggieTales in the House season 1, episode 3b (2014)
- "Trading Places", Wahlburgers season 3, episode 9 (2014)
- "Trading Places", Zoey 101 season 4, episode 1 (2008)
- "Trading Places", Zoobilee Zoo episode 9 (1986)

== See also ==
- Changing places (disambiguation)
- Trading Spaces
