= Changing places =

Changing places may refer to:

- Changing Places, a 1975 novel by David Lodge
- Changing Places, a 1983 album by musician Anne Clark
- Changing Places (album), a 2002 jazz album by Tord Gustavsen
- Changing Places (thought experiment), a thought experiment by Max Velmans
- Changing Places (campaign), a British consortium which aims to improve accessible toilet facilities
- "Changing Places" (Heartbeat), a 1992 British TV episode

== See also ==
- Trading Places (disambiguation)
