= Toilet seat riser =

Assistive technology device

Toilet seat risers, toilet risers, or raised toilet seats are assistive technology devices to improve the accessibility of toilets to older people or those with disabilities.

They can aid in transfer from wheelchairs, and may help prevent falls. Inappropriately high risers may actually increase fall risk.

Some people may find plastic risers to be unattractive or carry a stigma. They may also interfere with the toilet habits of other users.

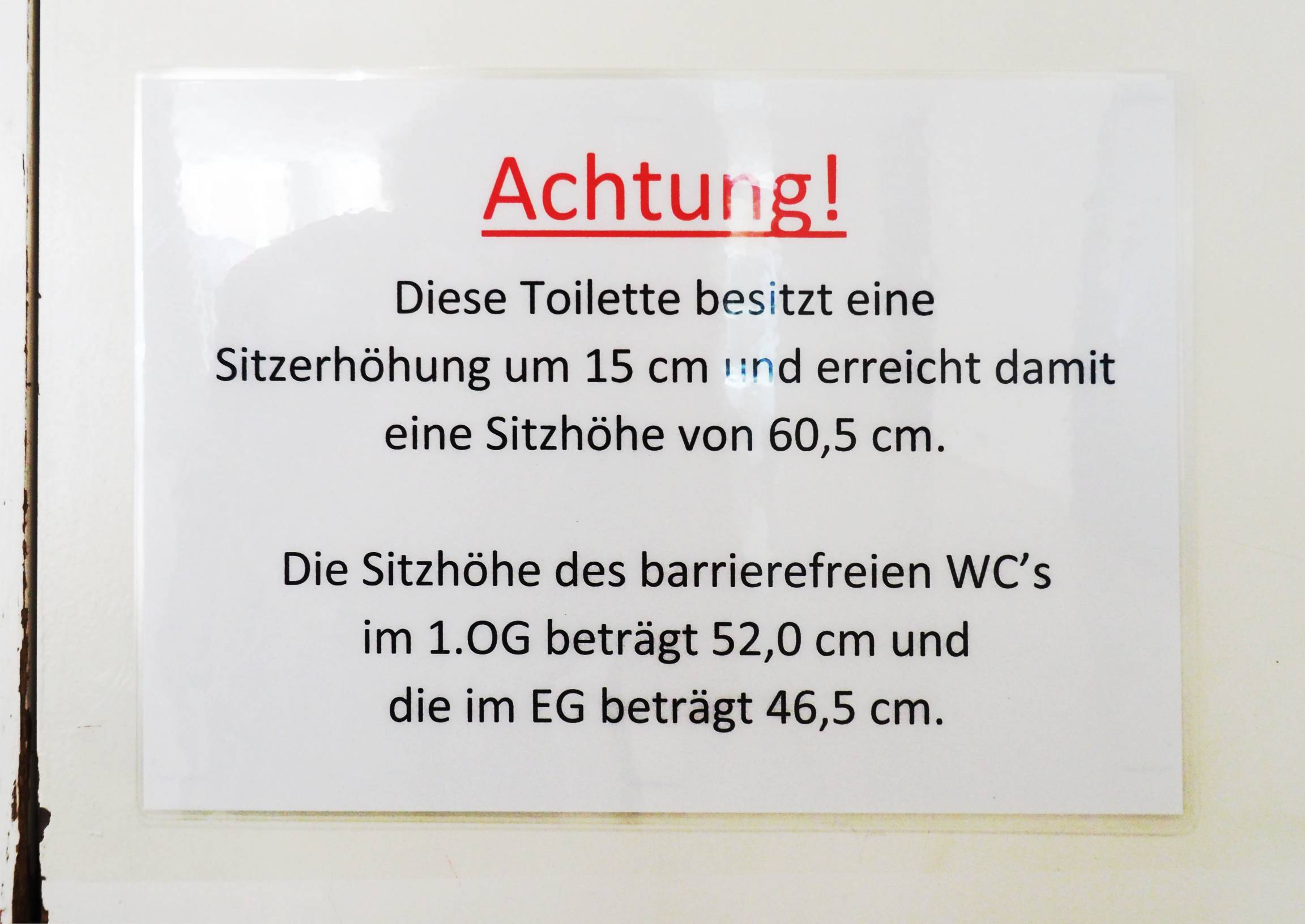
In a public building in Germany, a sign announces the availability of three accessible toilets with specified different seat heights.

== See also ==
- Grab bar
- Accessibility of toilets
- Home modifications
- Occupational Therapy
- Assistive Technology
