= Nurse call button =

Button that allows patients in health care settings to alert a nurse

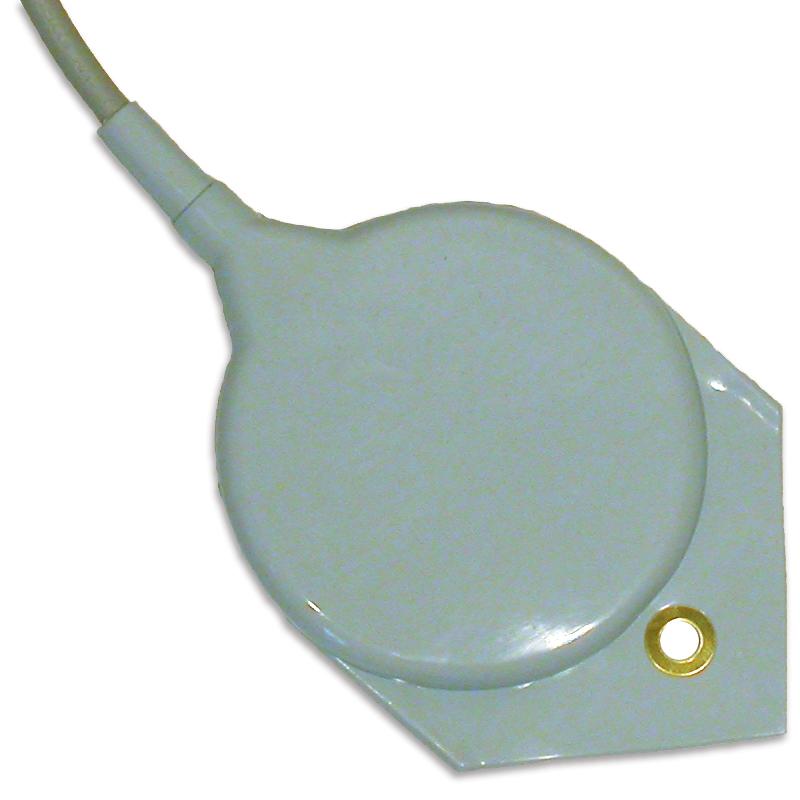
Pancake nurse call button for limited mobility patients

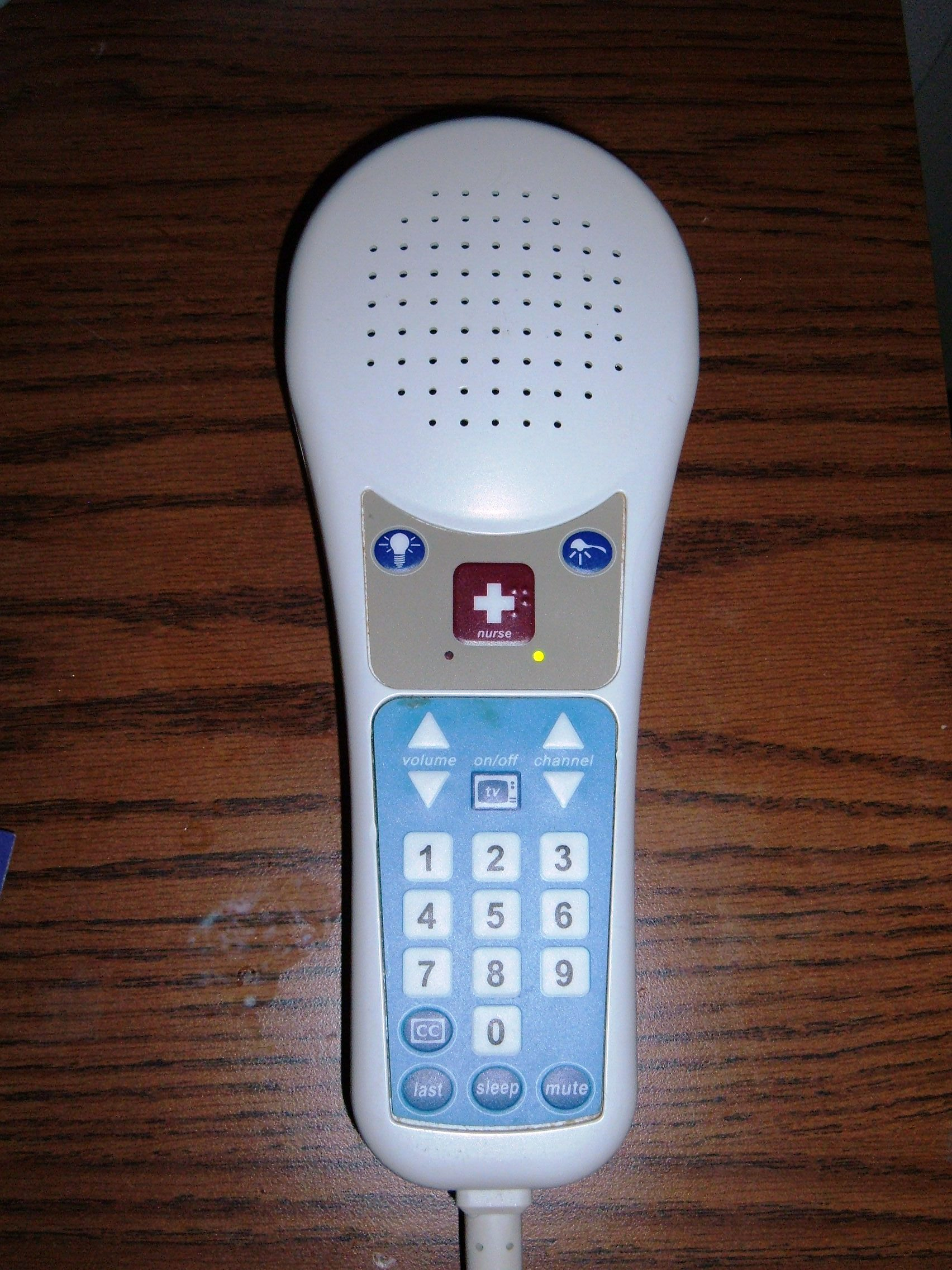
A nurse call button on a pillow speaker with TV controls

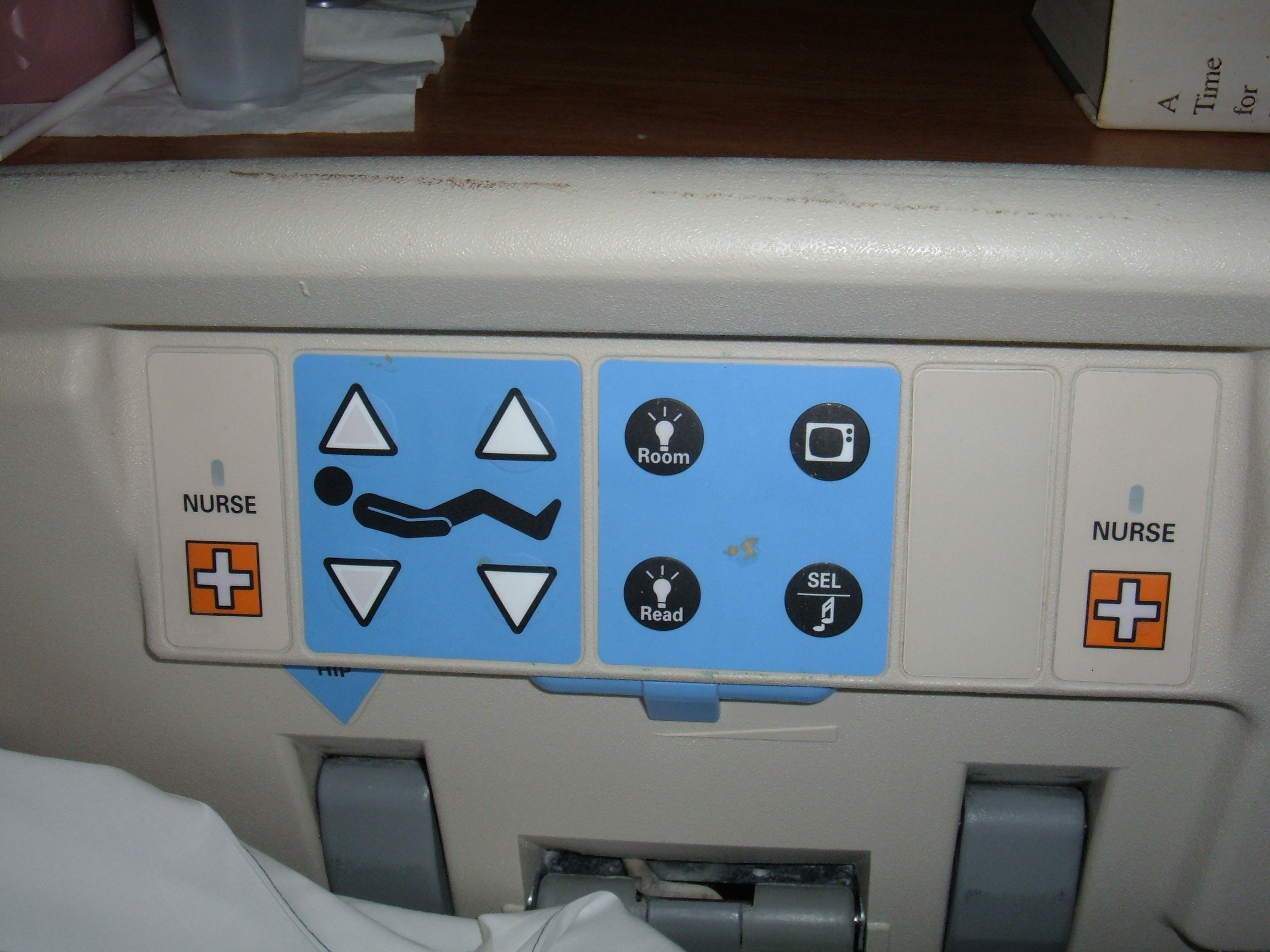
This hospital bed has a nurse call button on its rails

A nurse call button is a button or cord found in hospitals and nursing homes, at places where patients are at their most vulnerable, such as beside their bed and in the bathroom. It allows patients in health care settings to alert a nurse or other health care staff member remotely of their need for help. When the button is pressed, a signal alerts staff at the nurse's station, and usually, a nurse or nurse assistant responds to such a call. Some systems also allow the patient to speak directly to the staffer; others simply beep or buzz at the station, requiring a staffer to actually visit the patient's room to determine the patient's needs.

The call button provides the following benefits to patients:

- Enables a patient who is confined to bed and has no other way of communicating with staff to alert a nurse of the need for any type of assistance
- Enables a patient who is able to get out of bed, but for whom this may be hazardous, exhausting, or otherwise difficult to alert a nurse of the need for any type of assistance
- Provides the patient an increased sense of security

The call button can also be used by a health care staff member already with the patient to call for another when such assistance is needed, or by visitors to call for help on behalf of the patient.

== Laws and regulations ==
Laws in most places require that a call button must be in reach of the patient at all times; for example, in the patient's bed or on an easily reachable surface (such as an end table or nightstand.) Call buttons are essential to patients in emergencies. There are also laws that determine the amount of time in which staff must respond to a call, though mandatory response times vary by location.

It is the responsibility of nursing staff to explain to the patients that they have a call button and to teach them how to use it.

== Overuse ==
Some patients develop the habit of overusing call buttons. This can lead staff to develop frustration and alarm fatigue, which can result in them ignoring patient calls or otherwise not taking them seriously. "Alarm fatigue" occurs when staff are exposed to many frequent alarms, some of which may be false alarms, and consequently become desensitized to them. Alarm fatigue is particularly prevalent in nurses who must answer many patient calls per day. Staff cannot legally ignore such calls, as doing so violates the law in most places. Sometimes, mental health professionals will work with such patients in order to curtail their use of the button to serious need.

== System types ==
=== Basic ===
The most basic system has a single button near the patient's bedside, which they can push to call for assistance. When the button is pressed, nursing staff is alerted by a light and/or an audible sound at the nurse's station. This can only be turned off from the patient's bedside, thereby compelling staff to respond to the patient.

=== Wireless nurse call ===
Like hardwired systems, wireless call buttons have the ability to alert nursing staff using sounds or lights at the nurse's station. In addition, many wireless call systems can display messages on a terminal. An advantage to wireless call buttons is that installing them requires less wiring, reducing their cost. However, dome lights in hallways still usually require wiring for power. Disadvantages of wireless systems include the heightened risk of signal interference with other systems in the facility, the necessity of installing batteries in each patient station and changing them as needed, and a limited selection among UL 1069 approved wireless systems. There are a variety of Radio Frequencies used across the globe - for example the majority of Europe uses 433/868MHz.

=== Intercoms ===
In some facilities, often in hospitals, a more advanced system is used, which allows staff from the nurse's station to communicate directly with patients via intercom. This has the advantage of allowing nursing staff to immediately assess the severity of the situation and determine if immediate assistance is needed or if the patient can wait.

With the intercom system, the alert can be turned off from the nurse's station, allowing staff to avoid entering the patient's room if it is determined that the patient's need can be met without doing so.

=== Cell phone alerts ===
Newer technology allows call buttons to reach cell phone-like devices carried around by nursing staff. Staffers can then answer the calls from wherever they are located within the facility, thereby improving the speed and efficiency of the response.

== See also ==
- Bathroom emergency pullstring
