= Euro key =

Universal key for public toilets

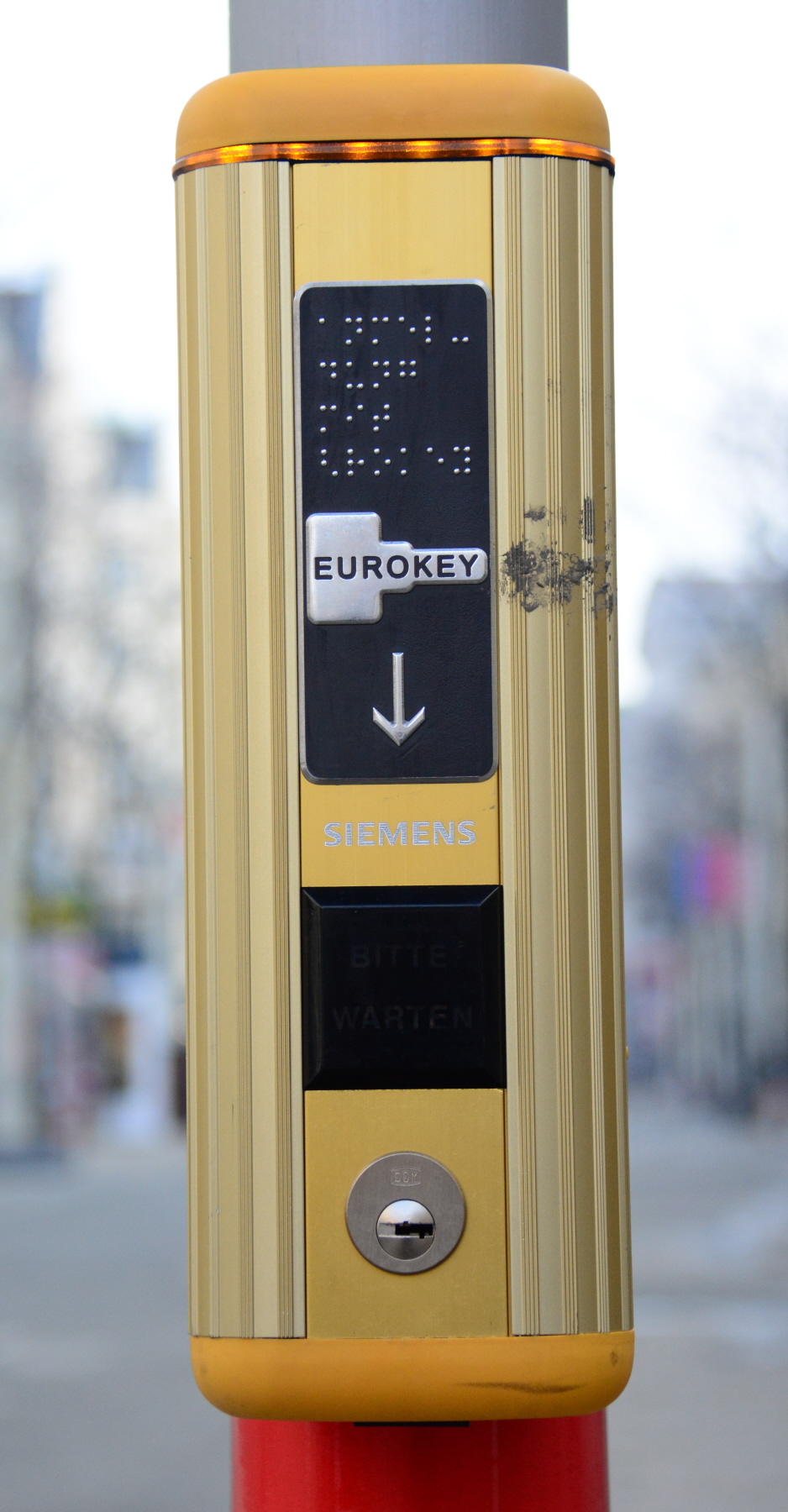
The Euro key on a pedestrian crossing in Vienna

Euro key (German: Euroschlüssel) is a locking system which allows people with physical disabilities to use locked accessible toilets across Europe. It was introduced in 1986 by the CBF Darmstadt (Club Behinderter und Freunde) in Darmstadt and environs.

People with certain disabilities can order a key online by providing medical documentation and paying a fee.

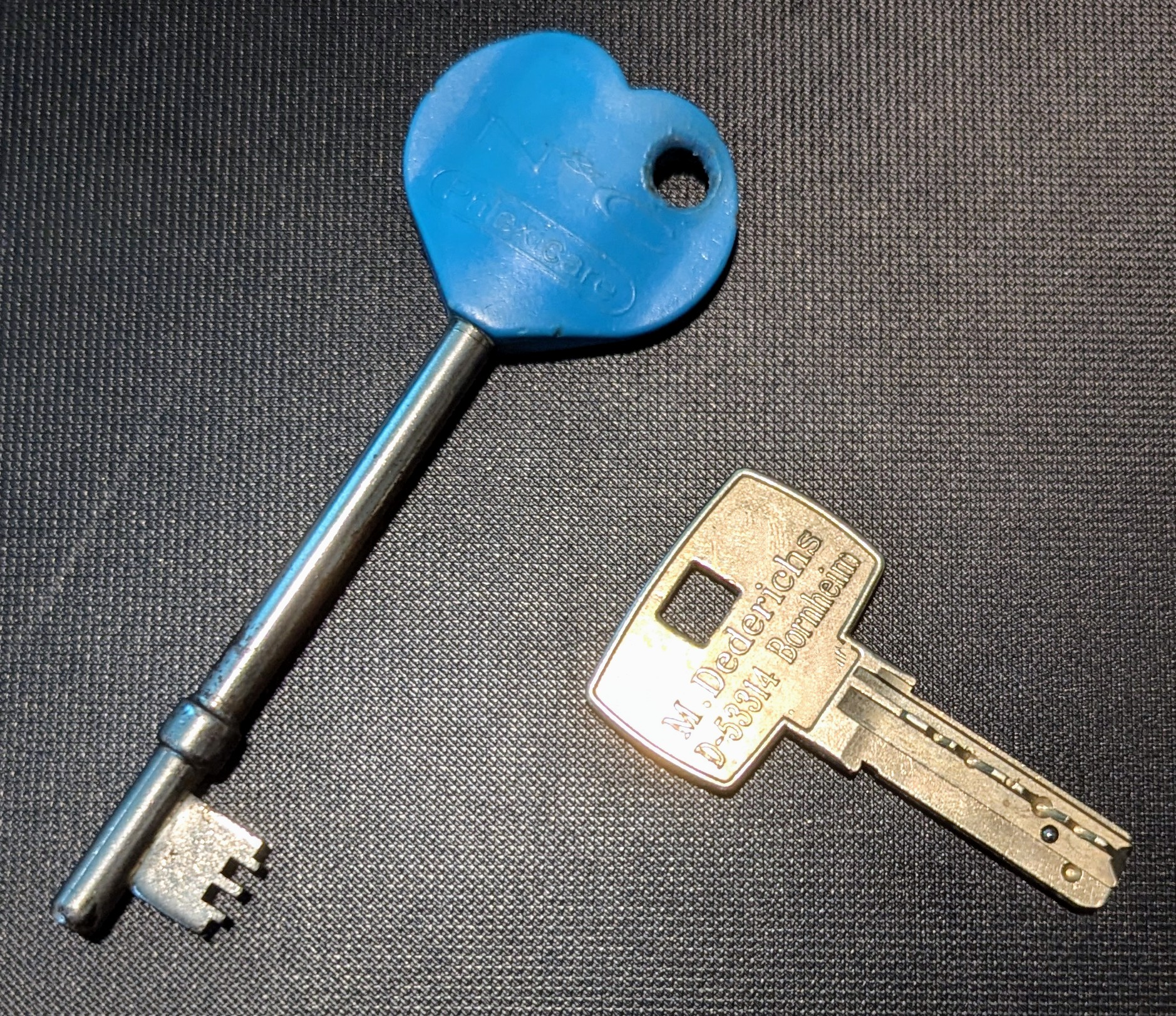
The Euro key (right), next to the United Kingdom equivalent RADAR key (left).

The Euro key is now widely used throughout the following European countries: Austria, Bulgaria, Czechia, Denmark, Finland, France, Germany, Italy, Liechtenstein, Norway, Portugal, Romania, Slovakia, Spain, Sweden, and Switzerland. There are approximately 12,000 locks that use the Eurokey.

at Schönbrunn Palace
