= Disability Rights UK =

British pan-disability charity

Disability Rights UK (DR UK) is a UK pan-disability charity which was set up with the aim of representing the needs and expectations of disabled people in the UK. Disability Rights UK was formed as a result of several disability charities merging in 2012.

== History ==
Disability Rights UK was formed through a unification of Disability Alliance, RADAR and National Centre for Independent Living on 1 January 2012. RADAR was formed in 1977 as the Royal Association for Disability and Rehabilitation.

== About RADAR ==
RADAR was an umbrella organisation which sought to work with and for disabled people in the UK. Its aim was to remove structural, economic and attitudinal barriers. It campaigned and produced policy statements and briefings on related issues and provided support services for its member organisations. RADAR merged with two other organisations to form Disability Rights UK in 2012.

== Activities ==
=== Campaigning ===
Disability Rights UK campaigns on a number of issues, including independent living, work and education, and against hate crime, bullying and negative attitudes towards disabled people.

=== Advice and Information ===
Disability Rights UK offers several advice phonelines: a service for disabled students, a service to report disability discrimination, support with personal budgets, and welfare rights advice for member organisations. As well as this, it publishes factsheets and guides on issues relevant to disabled people, such as working and obtaining social care.

==== RADAR key ====
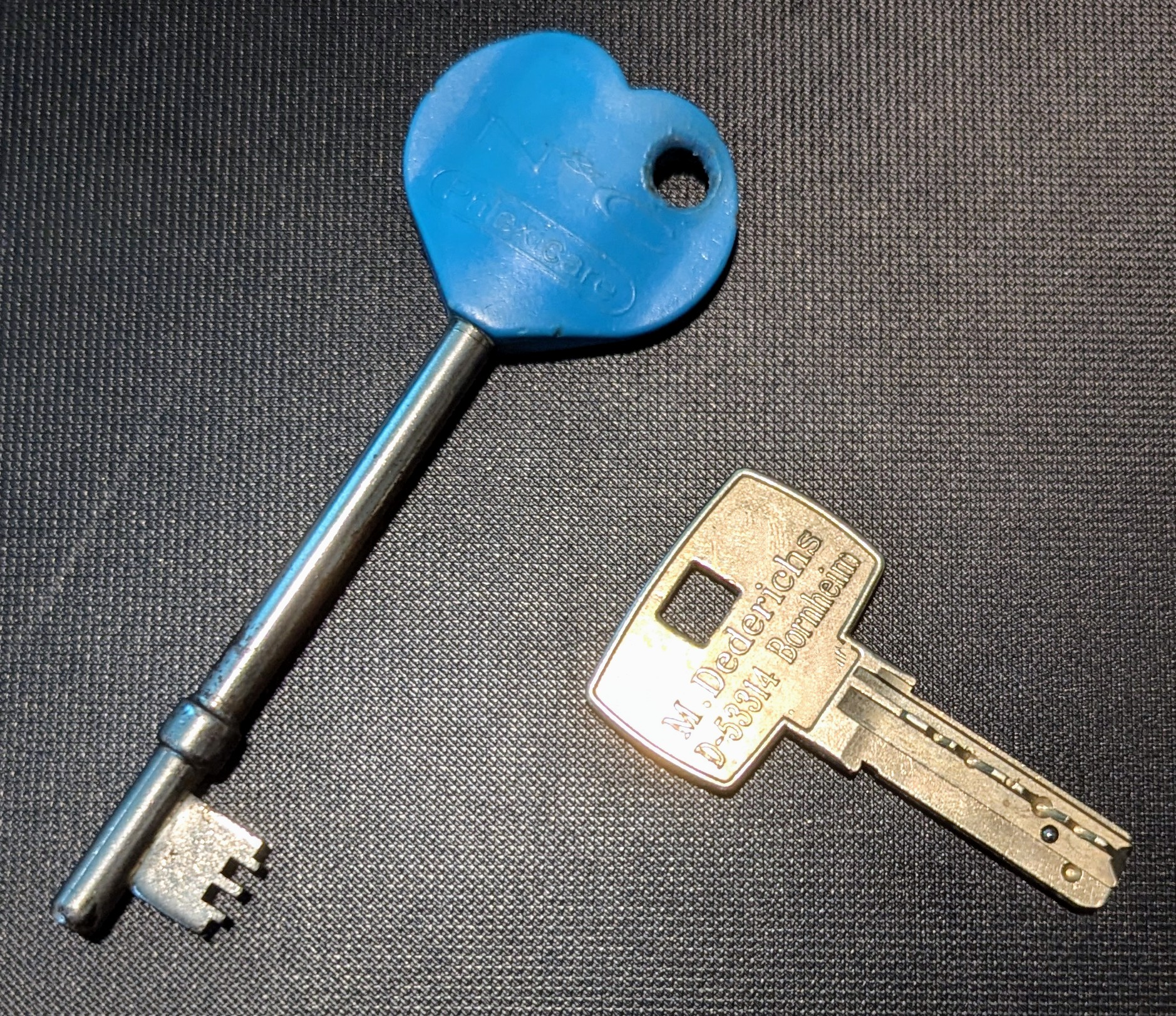
The RADAR key (left), next to the equivalent used in the Germanosphere, the Euro key (right)

The National Key Scheme (formerly known as the RADAR Key Scheme) is a universal key scheme, enabling disabled people to access accessible toilets in the UK, that prevents misuse and vandalism of these facilities. The scheme has continued to be formally administered by Disability Rights UK as the legacy organisation of RADAR. There are at least 9,000 toilets in the UK that can be accessed with the key. The key itself is designed with many features – such as its large size – to enable users with physical impairments to use the key with greater ease. Keys can be obtained from Disability Rights UK, local authorities, and online. Unlike other sellers, all profits from keys sold by Disability Rights UK are ploughed back into services for disabled people.
