= Changing Places (campaign) =

British campaign for accessible toilet facilities

Changing Places is a British consortium and campaign which aims to improve accessible toilet facilities. It maintains a list of toilets across the United Kingdom which meet its requirements—as of March 2020, 1,460 had been registered. Locations include 100 Tesco supermarkets, and the Tower of London.

== History ==
The Changing Places consortium was established in 2005.

In 2019, the Scottish Government launched a consultation on changes to planning rules which would see the introduction of requirements for Changing Places facilities.

From 2021, it will be compulsory in England for many new buildings to include a Changing Places facility. It was also announced that Changing Places facilities would be installed at 37 motorway services which would mean that 87 of England's 118 services will have a Changing Places facility.

== Work ==
The consortium states that standard accessible toilets do not meet the requirements of around 250,000 disabled people in the United Kingdom and has created a list of requirements for a Changing Places facility. These include a minimum area for the facility, a hoist, changing bench, and curtain.

A map of Changing Places facilities can be viewed on the Changing Places website, and reviews can be written via an app.
