= Tianyin Pharmaceutical =

Chinese pharmaceutical company

Tianyin Pharmaceutical Co., Inc.
- Company type: Public
- Traded as: AMEX: TPI
- Industry: Healthcare – Drug Manufacture
- Founded: 1994
- Headquarters: Chengdu, the People’s Republic of China
- Key people: Guoqing Jiang (Chief Executive Officer, Chairman, President, and Chief Accounting Officer) James Jiayuan Tong (Chief Financial Officer, and Director) Yang Tao (Chief Operating Officer) (Dec 31, 2013)
- Services: traditional Chinese medicine
- Revenue: $ 62.60M (Dec 31, 2013)
- Number of employees: 1200 (Dec 31, 2013)

Tianyin Pharmaceutical (AMEX: TPI) was set up in 1994 and now is based in Chengdu, China. The company focuses on biopharmaceutical medicines, famous for its generics, traditional Chinese medicines. Most of the products are used in internal medicines, gynecology, hepatology, otolaryngology, urology, neurology, gastroenterology, and orthopedics. Chengdu Tianyin Pharmaceutical Co., Ltd. is the TPI’s subsidiary.

== Products and services ==
In 2010, there were 56 Chinese medicines and pharmaceuticals produced by the company approved by the State Food and Drug Administration (SFDA), 23 of which are listed in the National Medical Reimbursement List (NMRL) and seven are listed in the Essential Drug List (EDL) of China. Nearly half of the medicines are prescription medicines.

Major products are Ginkgo Mihuan Oral Liquid (GMOL, targeting cardiovascular indications), Benorylate Granules, Xiaoyanlidan Tablets, Qijudihuang Mixture, Qianggan Syrup, Kangjunxiaoyan capsule and others.

== Research and development ==
Currently there are 17 products pending SFDA approval and engages in cooperation with many academic institutions in China, such as China Pharmaceutical University, Sichuan University, and Shaanxi University of Chinese Medicines.
In September 2013 Tianyin Pharmaceutical received the Official Certificate of GMP for both of its pre-extraction plant and formulation facilities by the China Food and Drug Administration (CFDA) officials.
July. 2013, the company’s product Gingko Mihuan Oral Liquid (GMOL) was awarded Provincial Essential Drug List (PEDL) status at Guangdong Province. Before that, the company has included in the list in four provinces, namely Henan Province, Shandong Province, Sichuan Province and the City of Chongqing.
