= Tehran Psychiatric Institute =

Iranian research institute

Tehran Psychiatric Institute, School of Behavioral Sciences and Mental Health
- انستيتو روانپزشكي تهران، دانشکده ی علوم رفتاری و سلامت روان
- Type: Public
- Established: 1977
- President: Jafar Bolhari
- Location: Tehran, Tehran, Iran
- Website: tip.iums.ac.ir

Tehran Psychiatric Institute, School of Behavioral Sciences and Mental Health (TPI) (Persian: انستيتو روانپزشكي تهران، دانشکده علوم رفتاری و سلامت روان) is a professional center of education, research and practice of psychiatry and clinical psychology, founded in 1977 in Tehran, Iran.

TPI, as a division of Iran University of Medical Sciences, is active in the fields of professional psychiatric training, education of clinical psychology at the levels of MA and Ph.D. as well as research in related topics and treatment of patients with mental illness.
