= Trading Places International =

American vacation services company

- Headquarters: Lake Forest, California
- Parent: Capital Vacations
- Website: tradingplaces.com

Trading Places International (TPI) is a corporation located in Lake Forest, California. TPI provides a full spectrum of vacation services to vacation interval owners, resort associations, and resort developers. They rank third worldwide in independent vacation exchanges confirmed annually at hundreds of resorts. The company specializes in association and resort management, vacation exchanges, rentals, owner resales, traditional travel, and developer support offerings.

Similar to RCI, TPI works directly with resorts and individual owners in affiliate programs. If the owner of a timeshare unit at one of TPI's member resorts is in good financial standing with their resort, then TPI allows the owner to deposit their timeshare week(s) and exchange their week(s) with TPI's available inventory. Typically, TPI allows an owner to deposit their week(s) up to a year advance of arrival date; this practice is sometimes referred to as "banking your week(s)". Timeshare owners may exchange their week(s) through TPI for a different week(s) at their own resort. Timeshare owners are able to exchange to destinations all over the world or back to their home resort.

Trading Places, unlike many timeshare companies, also acts as a property manager for some properties. Its largest competitor using the same model (free membership) is Dial-an-Exchange (DAE Live). Their largest competitors that charge yearly memberships are Resort Condominiums International and Interval International (However, Interval International owns Trading Places within their corporate structure).

In November 2010, Trading Places was acquired by Interval Leisure Group.

In May 2022, Trading Places was acquired by Capital Vacations.
