= Bathroom emergency pullstring =

Emergency communication device for bathroom facilities

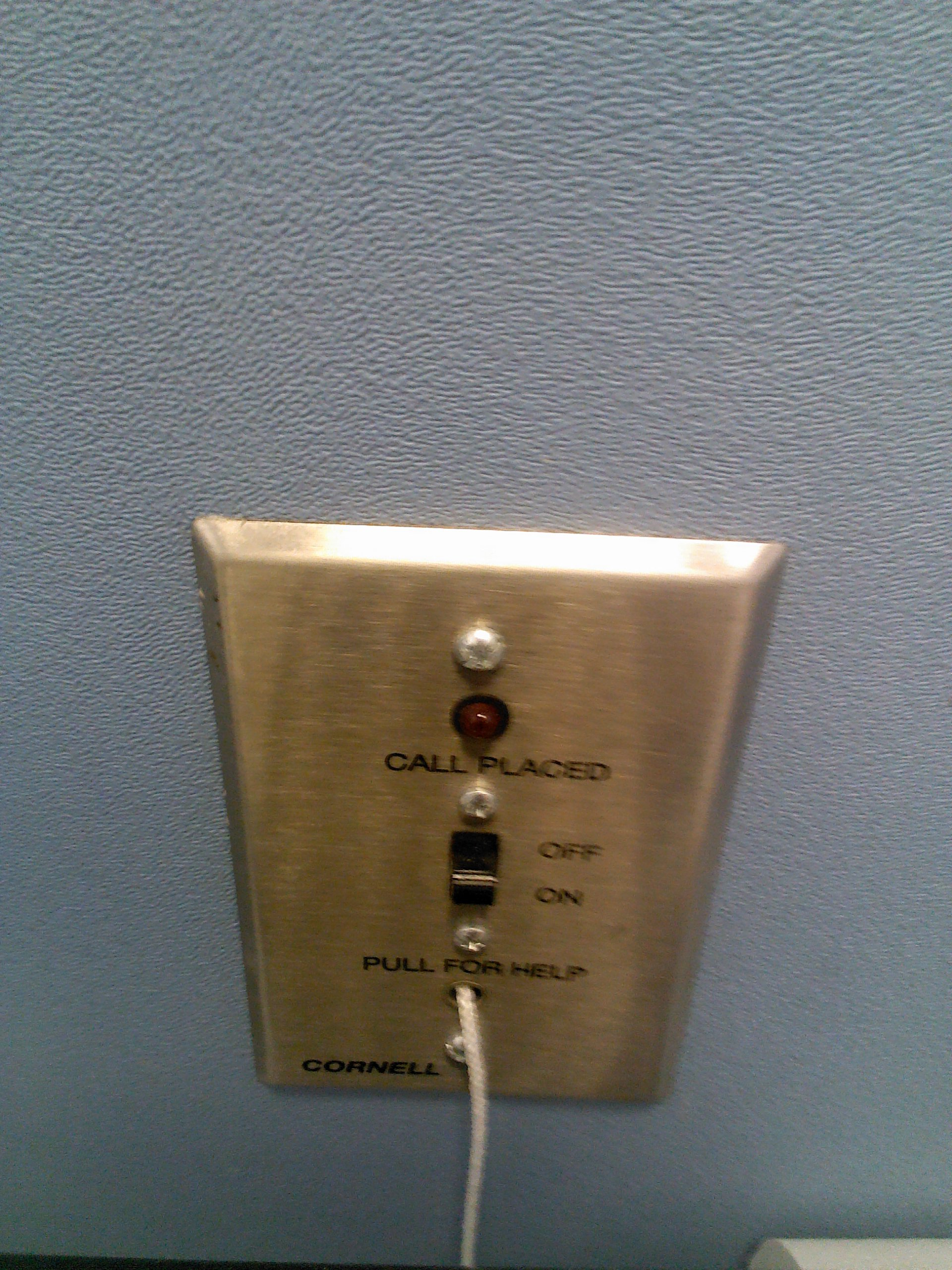
An emergency pull string located in a New Jersey hospital bathroom.

A bathroom emergency pullstring is a cord found in some bathrooms and restrooms that can be pulled in the event of an emergency suffered by the bathroom's user, such as a fall or lock-in. They are often found in the bathrooms of healthcare facilities, such as hospitals, nursing homes, assisted livings, and doctor's offices, in places frequented by senior citizens or disabled people, such as senior centers, places of worship, or in senior housing, and in other places where trouble may arise, such as the lavatories on aircraft or trains and in hotels.

== Function ==
These pull cords are part of a communication system where, when pulled, a light outside the bathroom flashes, which notifies a nurse or someone who is around to help the person in need. In addition to the flashing light, a buzzer or tone can be heard. Ideally, they are placed near the toilet or shower.

For those living independently, the emergency cord is supplemental to other means for summoning help. Since not all falls will take place within reach of the cord, ideally, those using the bathroom should also have a method to call for help on their body.

Some medical issues such as heart attacks are likely to occur while on the toilet for certain high-risk groups, because straining to produce a bowel movement can exacerbate these issues. Bathroom activity is usually private and with a locked door, so the availability of a way to summon help can raise survival rates.

United States federal law requires that in facilities with emergency cords, the system must work properly.

== See also ==
- Nurse call button
- Toilet-related injuries and deaths
