= Transfer bench =

Mobility tool used in bathtubs

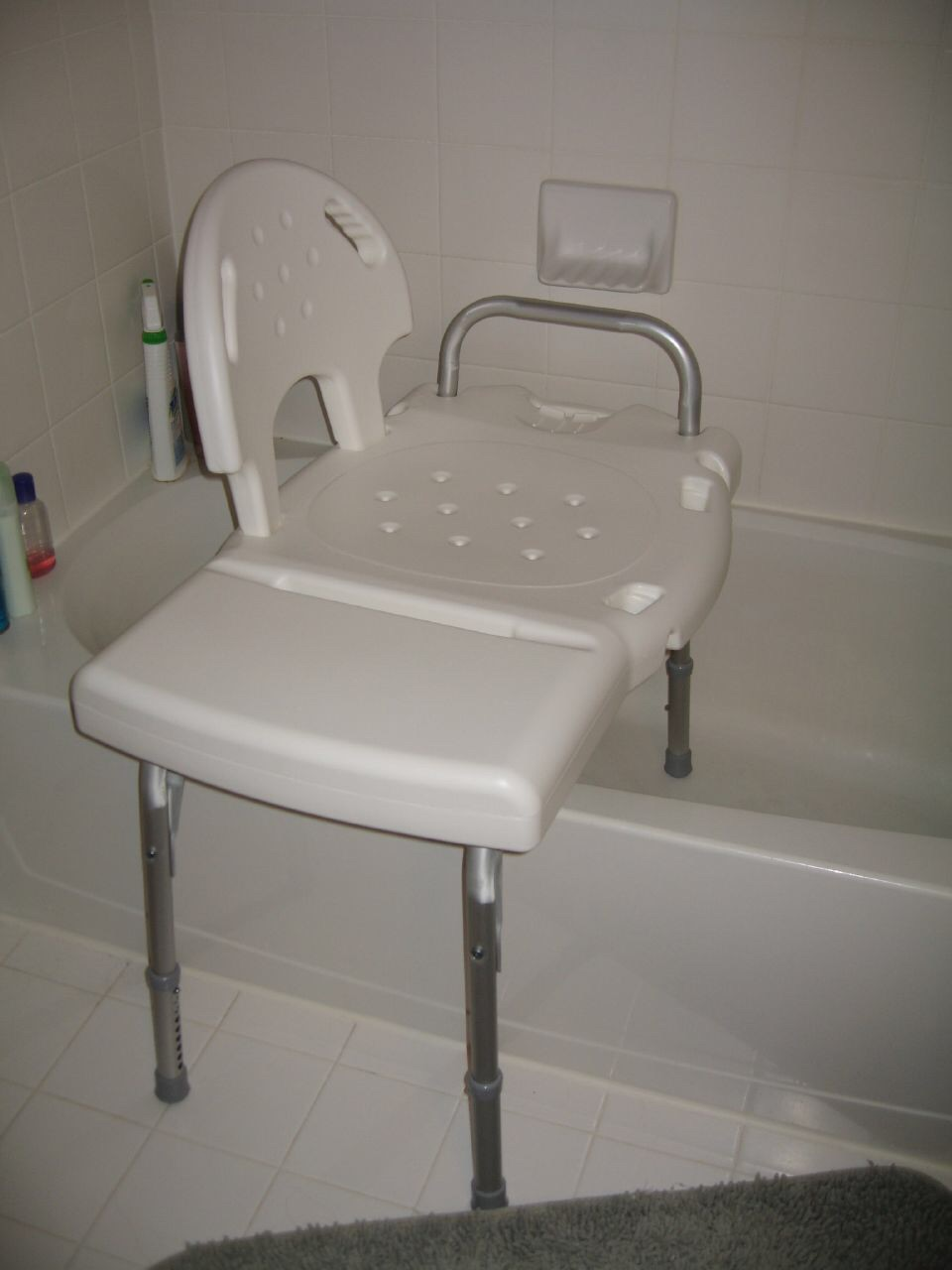
Transfer bench ready for use

A transfer bench (also known as a showering bench, shower bench, transfer tub bench, or transfer chair) is a bath safety mobility device on which the user sits to get into a bathtub. The user usually sits on the bench, which straddles the side of the tub, and gradually slides from the outside to the inside of the tub. Tub transfer benches are used by people who have trouble getting over the tub wall or into the shower, either because of illness or disability.

A smaller version without the longer bench extension, which sits wholly inside the tub, is known as a shower chair. Its handles are built-in within the chair's seat.

== Types ==
=== Non-sliding ===
A basic transfer bench typically consists of a backrest, long seat, and four legs. The legs inside the tub sometimes have plungers at their base that grip the tub's surface for stability. There are many different kinds, customized for the patient's needs. The size, (usually adjustable) height, and width can all vary. The user gets on the seat from the outside of the tub and scoots over on the seat to the inside, lifting one leg at a time over the tub's side.

Various optional accessories are available, such as a padded seat, commode opening, support backrests, or swing-away armrests.

=== Sliding or rolling ===
This varies from the transfer bench, in that instead of scooting to the other side, the user does not have to move their hips across the seat. The user simply sits on a seat and then slides to the other side, usually on rails or some kind of sliding frame. This reduces friction considerably and eases the movement for more highly dependent patients.

Shower or bath benches come in different lengths, along with such options as padded seats, swivel seats, and cut-out seats. Some are freestanding, while others attach to the side of the tub. There are also models that integrate with a wheeled chair, with the transfer frame in the tub connecting to the chair.

A newly developed shower bench design has three sets of rails that dock together permitting a seated patient to roll from a mobile chair into a bathtub or shower. The first set of rails is part of a mobile chair and they sit below a detachable seat consisting of a seat rest, backrest, and optional armrests. The second rail set sits in the tub or shower and has a base similar to a common four-legged shower bench. The third set of rails are "connecting rails" that dock with the other two sets and creates a connecting bridge between them.

To use this type of shower bench, the caregiver first places the shower bench with rails in the bath or shower and stabilizes it. The caregiver then aligns the bridging rails with the shower bench's rails and locks them together using a cam lock. The next step is to roll the mobile chair (with seated patient) in position, and align and lock the mobile chair's rails with the bridge's rails (on the opposite side), again using a cam lock. Once the three sets of rails are connected, the caregiver can roll the chair (with the seated patient) over the rails laterally, off the wheeled base of the mobile chair, across the bridge, and into the shower or bath. The shower bench supports the seated patient and chair during bathing or showering.

The bridge rails and wheeled base can then be disconnected and moved away so the caregiver can have unobstructed access to the patient for bathing. When bathing is finished, the reverse process moves the patient from the bath back into the mobile chair.

Shower benches are often used in conjunction with a patient lift for highly dependent patients who cannot be manually moved from a wheelchair to the shower bench. In this case, the patient is hoisted in the sling-lift from a wheelchair or stretcher and seated on the shower bench so that they can then slide into the bath or shower.
