= Visitability =

Accessible design approach for new housing

Visitability is the design approach for new housing ensuring that anyone who uses a wheelchair or other mobility device should be able to visit. A social visit requires the ability to get into the house, to pass through interior doorways, and enter a bathroom to use the toilet. Visitability stresses specific accessibility features from a social reform perspective, and counters social isolation.

== Description ==
Newly constructed homes often contain the same major barriers as older ones: steps at every entrance and narrow interior doors, with the bathroom door usually the narrowest one in the house. Supporters want to change construction practices so that virtually all new homes, whether or not designated for people with mobility impairments, offer three specific accessibility features that will make it possible for most people to visit:

1. at least one zero-step entrance on an accessible route leading from a driveway or public sidewalk,
2. all interior doors being wide enough to allow a wheelchair to pass through (approximately 81 cm or 32 in), and
3. at least a toilet (room) on the main floor.

These features are designed around the needs of a person using a wheelchair while visiting, but they are also helpful to people with other kinds of mobility impairments. Temporary disabilities could create a need; for example, a resident could break a leg and require a wheelchair, walker or other mobility device for an extended period.

- Living permanently in the home with a significant mobility impairment requires two additional basic features on the main floor: a full bathroom and a bedroom (or a space that could be converted to a bedroom).
- Visitability is similar to universal design in general intention, but is more focused in scope, more specific in parameters, and more explicitly grounded in a social reform intent.
- Neither of these is a part of the visitability standards.

Visitability features make homes easier for people who develop a mobility impairment to visit friends and extended family. The consequence of not having a visitable home is usually having to turn down invitations, or not be invited at all.

These features also provide a basic shell of access to permit newly disabled people to remain in their homes, rather than forcing them to do expensive renovations, relocate to a different house, live in an inaccessible home that endangers their health and safety, or move into a nursing home.

== Specific goals ==
1. A focus on single-family homes instead of public buildings. Access to new public buildings, such as government offices and restaurants, is typically already required under various national laws, such as the Americans with Disabilities Act of 1990 in the United States. Outside of the UK, single-family homes are the one kind of building which is still routinely constructed without regard to access.
2. Every home instead of just "special" homes. Being able to attend the party is better than isolation, or the risk of being "helped up the steps." People who use wheelchairs or walkers, or are impaired by stiffness, weakness or balance problems are blocked by steps at every entrance of a home. Wheelchair users are stopped by inches from fitting through the bathroom door in a friend or relative's home.
3. Narrowing the emphasis to the most essential features, which are:
  - entering a home,
  - fitting through the interior doors, and
  - being able to use a toilet.

While there are many possible or desirable features, strongly prioritizing the few features which are most crucial to visiting or residing in a home greatly increases the likelihood of widespread construction change.

Basic access goes beyond visiting. It also helps a person of any age who develops a temporary or permanent mobility impairment. Without basic access in place, architecture forces severe choices:

- Expensive renovations, assuming that the necessary changes are possible.
- Being unable to enter or exit the home independently, or to use the bathroom at all.
- Moving to another home or to a nursing home or other specialized facility.

These issues can apply equally to a person who is recovering from surgery, or to a person who has used a wheelchair for decades.

== New construction issues ==
Zero-step entrances on new homes are nearly always easy to construct, whether the terrain is flat or hilly. The entrance can be constructed at the front, side or back, wherever is most feasible for the topography. A driveway or sidewalk can be a tool for access to the best entrance. Porches and decks can be used to incorporate access, often in a manner that is not as obvious as many ramps. The key to accessibility is including access in the planning stage.

On new construction, a zero-step entrance can usually be incorporated without an obvious "ramp" per se, i.e., without a structure that has 90-degree dropoffs at the edges and rails at the sides. In most cases, grading and landscaping can make a ramp unnecessary. Deliberately grading to permit the sidewalk to meet the porch without a step creates access with an invisible modification.

For the 40% of homes built with a slab-on-grade foundation, the zero-step entrance is typically extremely easy. The methods for homes are virtually identical to those used for slab-built commercial buildings such as banks and restaurants. For homes with basements or crawlspaces, several solutions can provide low-cost, attractive zero-step entrances. Among these are using a porch as a bridge to the sidewalk; lowering the first-floor rim joist into a notch in the foundation wall at the time of construction; a short, conventional ramp tied into a side or back deck or porch; creative use of a small retaining wall; and constructing the zero-step entrance from the garage.

Situating the home properly on the lot is the first step. After that, grading and landscaping with access in mind creates a zero-step entrance.

== History ==
In the United States, the Visitability movement was begun by grass roots advocates led by Eleanor Smith in an organization called Concrete Change. She originated and developed the concept in 1986, at that time using the term "Basic Home Access". In 1990, when US advocates learned that the term "visitability" was used in the United Kingdom (UK) for a similar concept, they adopted the term to emphasize that the goal is not the traditional "more homes for the disabled" but rather a change in standard homebuilding procedure.

The Atlanta chapter of Habitat for Humanity became the first organization to commit to going beyond accessibility in homes with disabled family members. By including these basic access features in every home built, their commitment contributes to an inclusive neighborhood for people with disabilities. Concrete Change continues to grow in number of participants and number of open-market houses built with the basic features.

In 2017 Eleanor Smith retired Concrete Change. The National Council on Independent Living has agreed to transition and maintain all her data from the Concrete Change website to a new website, www.visitability.org.

The UK has applied the most widespread legal application of the concept to date. In 1999, Parliament passed "section M", an amendment to residential building regulations requiring basic access in all new homes.

Advocates maintain that the philosophical underpinning of visitability is as important as the list of features. They maintain that building homes with steps at all entrances and narrow interior doors is an unacceptable violation of human rights, given the harsh effects the barriers have on so many people's lives: physically unsafe living conditions, social isolation and forced institutionalization.

== Benefits ==
- Residents in the community can welcome guests who use wheelchairs, crutches, canes or walkers (walking frames), or who have some other mobility impairment such as stiffness, weakness or poor balance. When visitability is in place, mobility-limited people are not socially isolated by architecture.
- A family member can develop a disability through illness, accident or aging. The person and their family are more likely to be able to remain in their existing home. The alternatives can be drastic:
  - Major, expensive renovation;
  - Sell your home to purchase another house, which still may need modifications for accessibility;
  - Build a new home or
  - Move out that family member to a nursing home.
- All residents find it easier to bring in baby strollers, grocery carts, or heavy furniture.
- Visitable homes enhance sale and resale in an era where both the number and the percent of older people are growing rapidly. Non-disabled buyers are attracted to well-designed homes that welcome their aging relatives and friends and provide easy-use convenience for themselves.
- Temporary disabilities, i.e., broken leg, surgery, etc., can require the use of a wheelchair or other mobility device during the recovery/rehabilitation period. This can be a major problem in most existing homes lacking these basic accessibility features, in some cases forcing a person out of their home during the recovery period.
- Visitability features cost little up front - unlike the much higher after-the-fact cost of widening doors, adding ramps or electric porch lifts and other remodeling.
- Besides human rights, advocates cite the economic implications of visitability. Research by the National Association of Home Builders indicates that by 2010, half of all US homes will be headed by persons 55 years old or older. Average nursing home costs exceed $60,000 per year per resident, while nearly 70% of nursing home costs are paid with public funds. Staying out of institutions as long as possible is a strong desire of most people and also financially beneficial to individuals, families, and society.

=== Disadvantages ===
- The adoption of visitability over the broad spectrum of newly constructed dwellings could lead to a built environment deemed sterile and disengaged from regional and traditional practices.
  - This can be easily overcome by incorporating visibility features into traditional designs and not trying to make it a cookie cutter design.

== Adoption of visitability laws ==
It is difficult to definitively track the adoption of visitability across the world. A combination of legal mandates, incentive programs, and voluntary programs exist. The term "visitability" is not used in all efforts. Other factors complicating the research include the lack of an organization assigned to monitor visitability ordinances, and ordinances and laws that often do not specify the agency responsible for implementation.

The AARP Public Policy Institute has produced a report – Increasing Home Access: Designing for Visitability. Page 32 has a summary of US efforts.

In the United States, successful visitability legislation has been passed in many localities, including Atlanta, Georgia; Pima County, Arizona; Bolingbrook, Illinois; San Antonio, Texas; and the State of California. As of June 2006, 46 state and local municipalities had a confirmed visitability program in place; while 25 of these programs are mandatory ordinances, the other 21 are voluntary initiatives (i.e. cash and tax incentives for builders and consumers, consumer awareness campaigns, and certification programs).

In addition, there are numerous efforts to establish visitability programs in other states, counties and cities across the country. The research identified another 30 initiatives currently underway. They range from organized groups of individuals with an expressed interest in beginning a visitability program to locations that are in the final stages of developing a program.

The resource site contains additional information, a visitability video and links to other visitability websites.
