= Grab bar =

Safety device

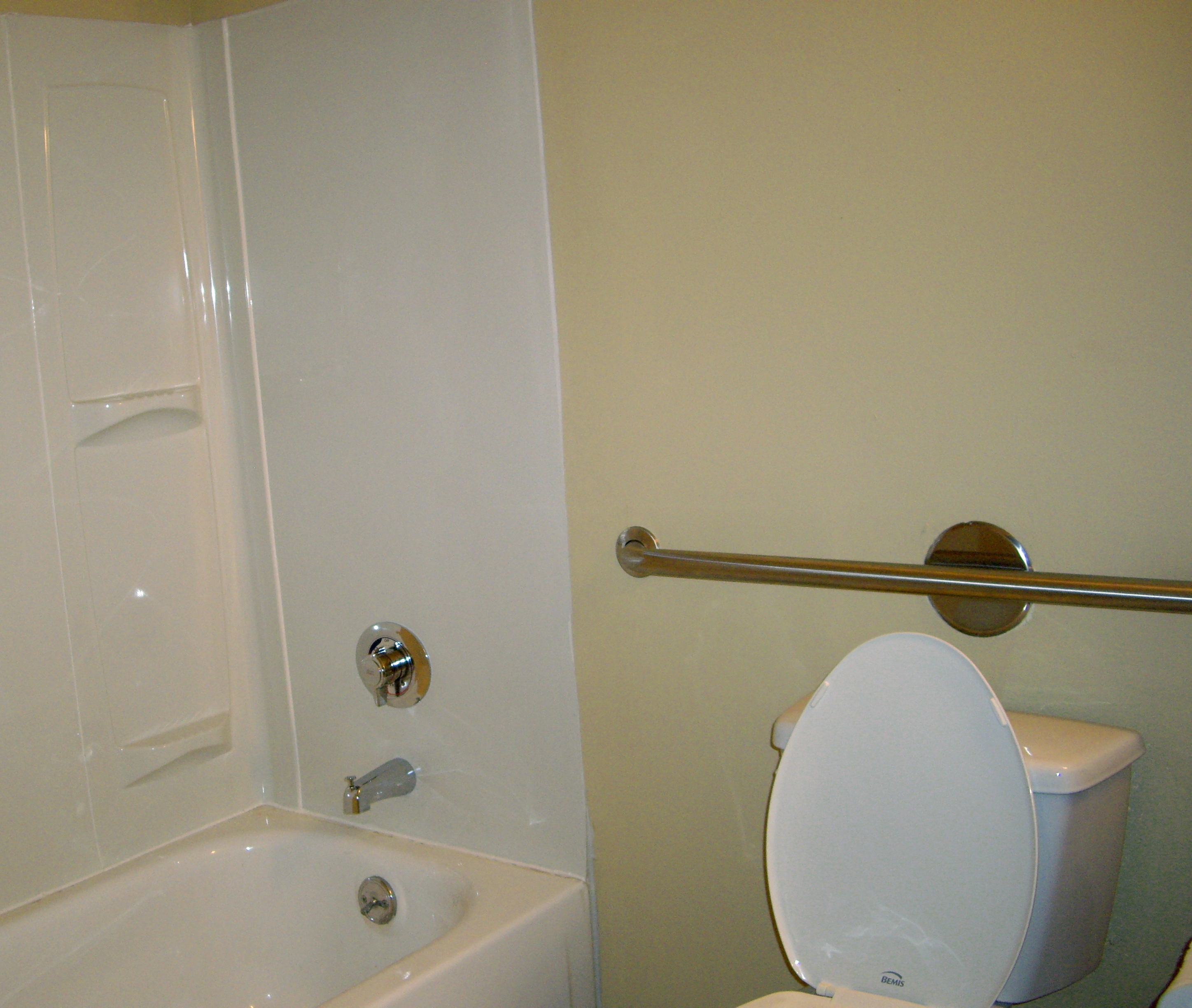
Grab bar mounted in a bathroom

Grab bars are safety devices designed to enable a person to maintain balance, lessen fatigue while standing, hold some of their weight while maneuvering, or have something to grab onto in case of a slip or fall. A caregiver may use a grab bar to assist with transferring a patient from one place to another. A worker may use a grab bar to hold on to as he or she climbs, or in case of a fall.

== Construction ==
Grab bars must bear high loads and sudden impacts, and most jurisdictions have building regulations specifying what loads they must bear. They are generally mounted to masonry walls or to the studs of stud walls (which may need to be specially strengthened). They can be mounted through drywall into a strong wooden wall stud or other structural member, but not mounted only on the drywall, as it will not bear the users' weight.

Grab bars are made of metal, plastic, fibreglass, and composites. For wet areas such as bathrooms, the material must be waterproof. Stainless steel, nylon-coated mild steel, epoxy-coated aluminium, ABS plastic, and even vinyl-coated metal and plastic.

== Accessibility ==
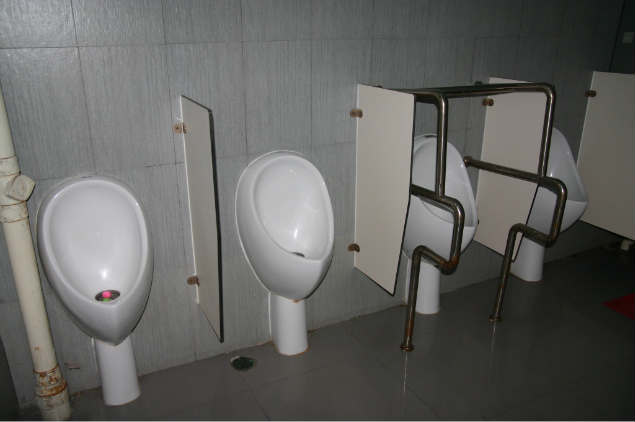
Waterless urinals, one with grab bars for users who have disabilities.

Grab bars increase accessibility and safety for people with a variety of disabilities or mobility difficulties. Although they are most commonly seen in public handicapped toilet stalls, grab bars are also used in private homes, assisted living facilities, hospitals, and nursing homes. Grab bars are most commonly installed next to a toilet or in a shower or bath enclosure.

Some grab bars also have a light feature and double as a night light offering up a little more safety at night when using the bathroom.

=== Locations ===
Many jurisdictions have regulations on grab bar placement and floorplans for public lavatories (American ADA, British Approved Document M regulations).

- Grab bars next to a toilet help people using a wheelchair transfer to the toilet seat and back to the wheelchair. They also assist people who have difficulty sitting down, have balance problems while seated or need help rising from a seated position.
- Used in a shower or bathtub, grab bars help to maintain balance while standing or maneuvering, assist in transferring into and out of the enclosure, and generally help to mitigate slips and falls.
- Floor to ceiling grab bars, or security poles, can be used in the bedroom to help one get out of bed or get up from a chair, or to help caregivers by assisting in transfers.

Grab bars are often used in conjunction with other medical devices to increase safety. For example, a grab bar added to a shower is frequently used with a shower chair and hand held shower head. Grab bars installed by a doorway are usually added near a railing. In addition, grab bars can be placed on any wall where extra support is needed even if it is not the "usual place" they are used.

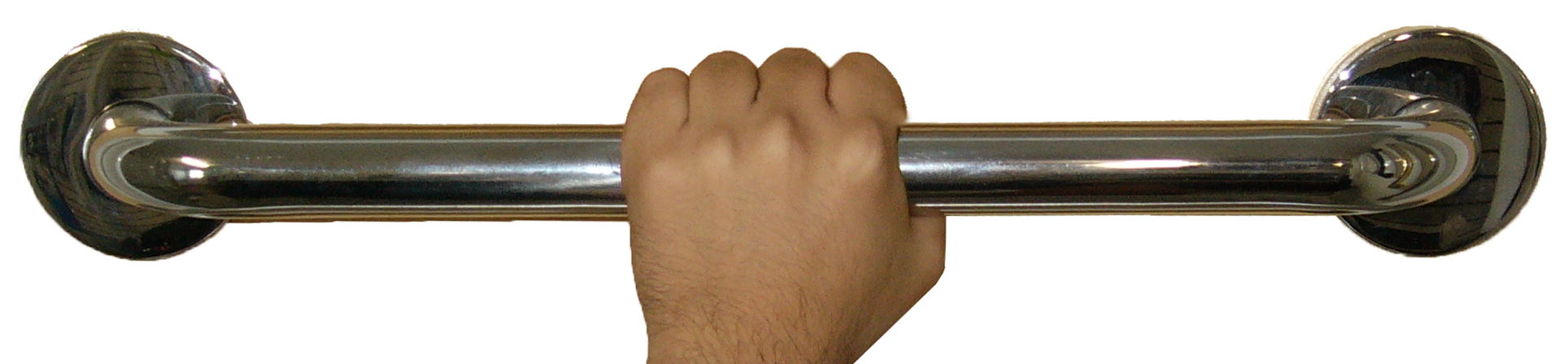
Grab Bars reduce falls

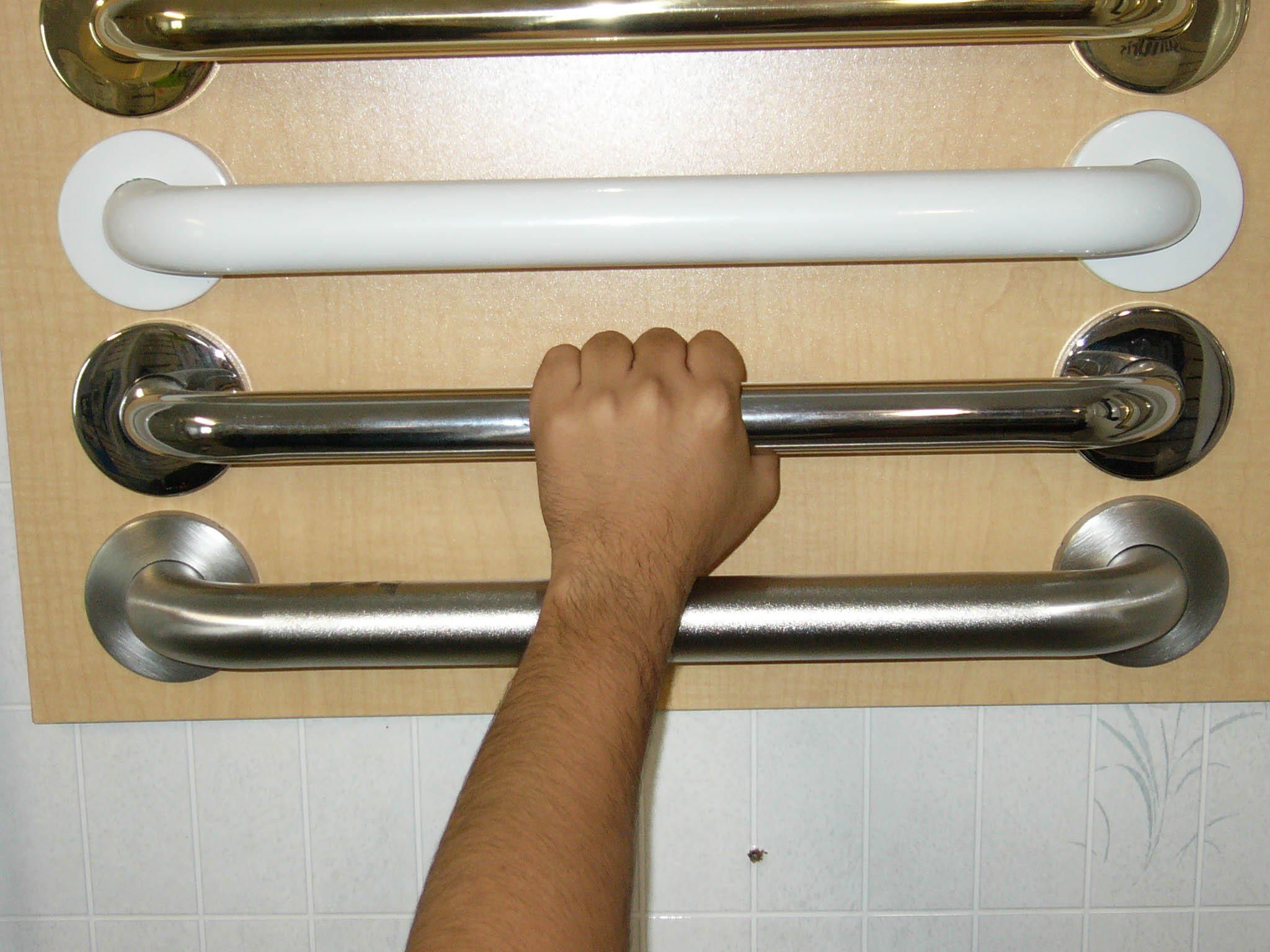
Grab Bars come in different styles and colors

=== Positions ===
Grab bars can be installed in different positions:

- Vertical grab bars may help with balance while standing.
- Horizontal grab bars provide assistance when sitting or rising, or to grab onto in case of a slip or fall.
- Some grab bars can be installed at an angle, depending on the needs of the user and the positioning. Grab bars installed horizontally offer up the greatest safety and care should be taken when installing them on the angle, as this is contrary to the ADA Guidelines. Often this angled installation is easier for people pulling themselves up from a seated position.

There are many considerations when deciding which grab bar to use and how best to install it. Properly securing a grab bar is important so that it doesn't pull out of the wall when pressure is applied to it. Each installation should be properly secured into wall blocking or studs to provide the best support. If no studs are available, specialized mollies can be used to spread out grab forces across a wider area of the wall.

=== ADA guidelines ===
The Americans with Disabilities Act of 1990 Accessibility Guidelines for Buildings and Facilities (ADAAG) defines requirements for installing grab bars in public bathing and toileting facilities. The guidelines are supported by substantial research regarding the best placement of grab bars.

The following is a subset of ADA grab bar guidelines:

- The diameter of grab bars should be 1 1/4 to 1 1/2 inches (32 to 38 mm) (or the shape shall provide an equivalent gripping surface)
- There shall be a 1 1/2 inches (38 mm) clearance from the wall.
- Grab bars should not rotate in their fittings.
- The required mounting height is universally 33 to 36 inches (840 to 910 mm) from top of gripping surface of the grab bar to the finish floor. DOJ 2010 ADA standards 609.4.
- ADA-style grab bars and their mounting devices should withstand more than 250 pounds (1112 N) of force.
- In public toilet stalls, side grab bars must be a minimum of 42 inches long and mounted 12 inches from the rear wall, and rear grab bars must be a minimum of 36 inches long and mounted a maximum of 6 inches from the side wall.

=== Styles ===
While the ADA guidelines provide specifics on the placement of grab bars in public locations, they do not require a specific style. The regulations set out in Approved Document M specify a minimum contrast between bars and background. Many public facilities opt for the cheapest grab bars, which usually have an institutional look. However, grab bars are actually available in many styles, finishes and colours. Manufacturers have begun to understand the need to blend in with home décor and now offer products to this end. For the home, grab bars do not need to be ADA compliant, but those guidelines should be considered. In addition to straight grab bars, there are fold-out bars, those that clamp onto the side of the bathtub, L-shaped, U-shaped and corner grab bars. Grab bars are also made with built in LED lighting and can come in many different colours.

== In industry and construction ==
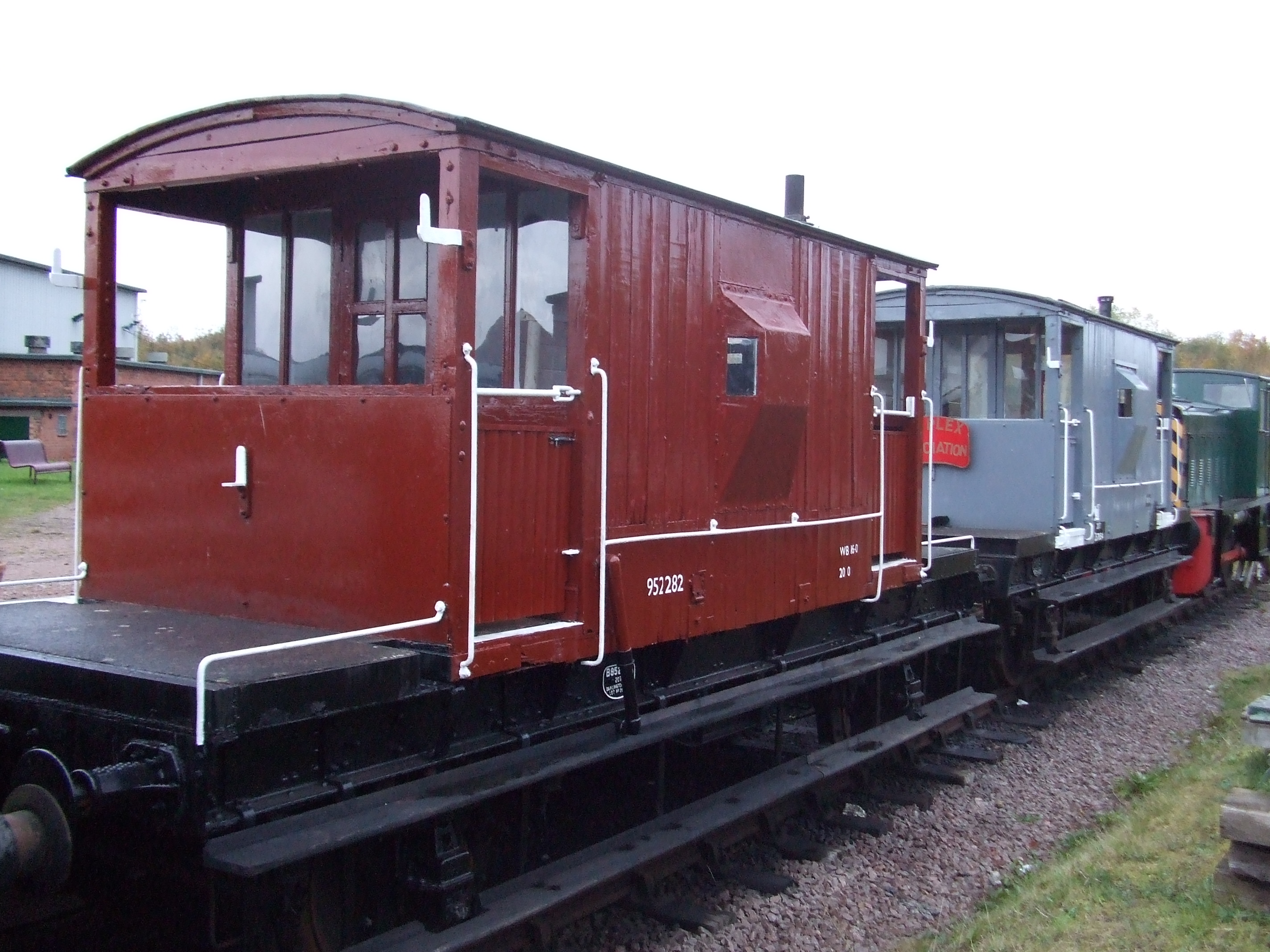
Horizontal and vertical grab bars (white) on the sides of British railroad brake vans.

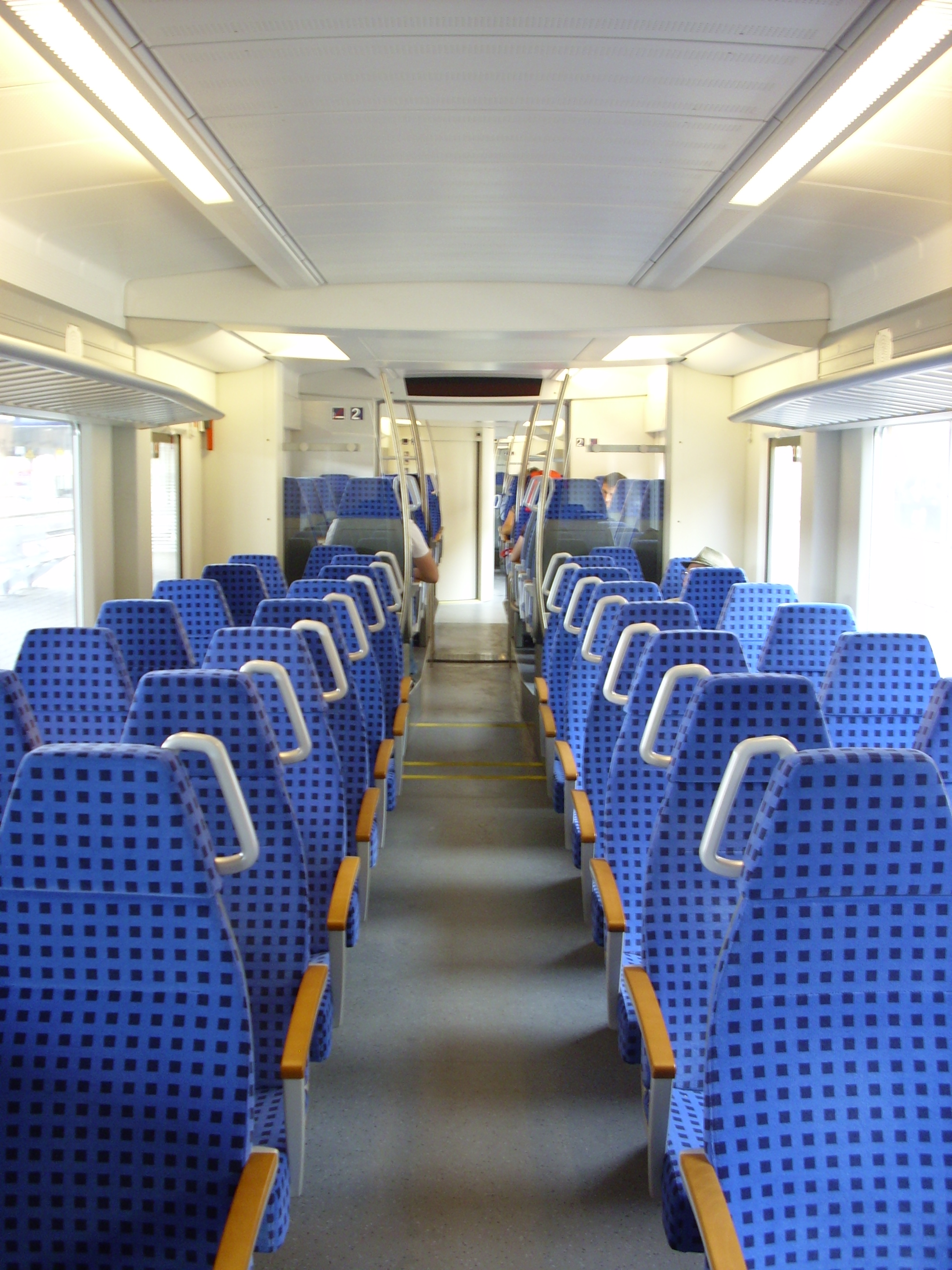
Grab rails on a longer-distance commuter train catering for mainly seated passengers

Grab bars in industry and construction are found on equipment or above fixed ladders where footholds exist but other handholds are lacking. They may be positioned horizontally, vertically, or at an angle.

When using grab bars as safety devices in order to prevent falls, your best choice would be a horizontal bar. Scientific research has found that gripping strength is far greater using a horizontal bar than a vertical bar in a fall situation. This makes horizontal grab bars the safest choice.

Grab bars were required on U.S. railroad cars by the Railroad Safety Appliance Act of 1893. Occupational Safety and Health Administration (OSHA) guidelines describe the requirements for grab bar clearance, diameter and spacing on fixed ladders. These regulations state that the clearance in the back of grab bars must be at least 4 inches, the diameter similar to the ladder rungs and, when horizontal, grab bars must be spaced by a continuation of the rung spacing. In 2008-2009 alone, the USDOL Bureau of Labor Statistics reported 241 casualties from ladder falls.

Siderail extensions horizontal grab bars may be bolted or welded to fixed ladders. Grab bars may be mounted to the curb for access to rooftops and rooftop hatches.

== See also ==
- Fall prevention
