= Typology of Greek vase shapes =

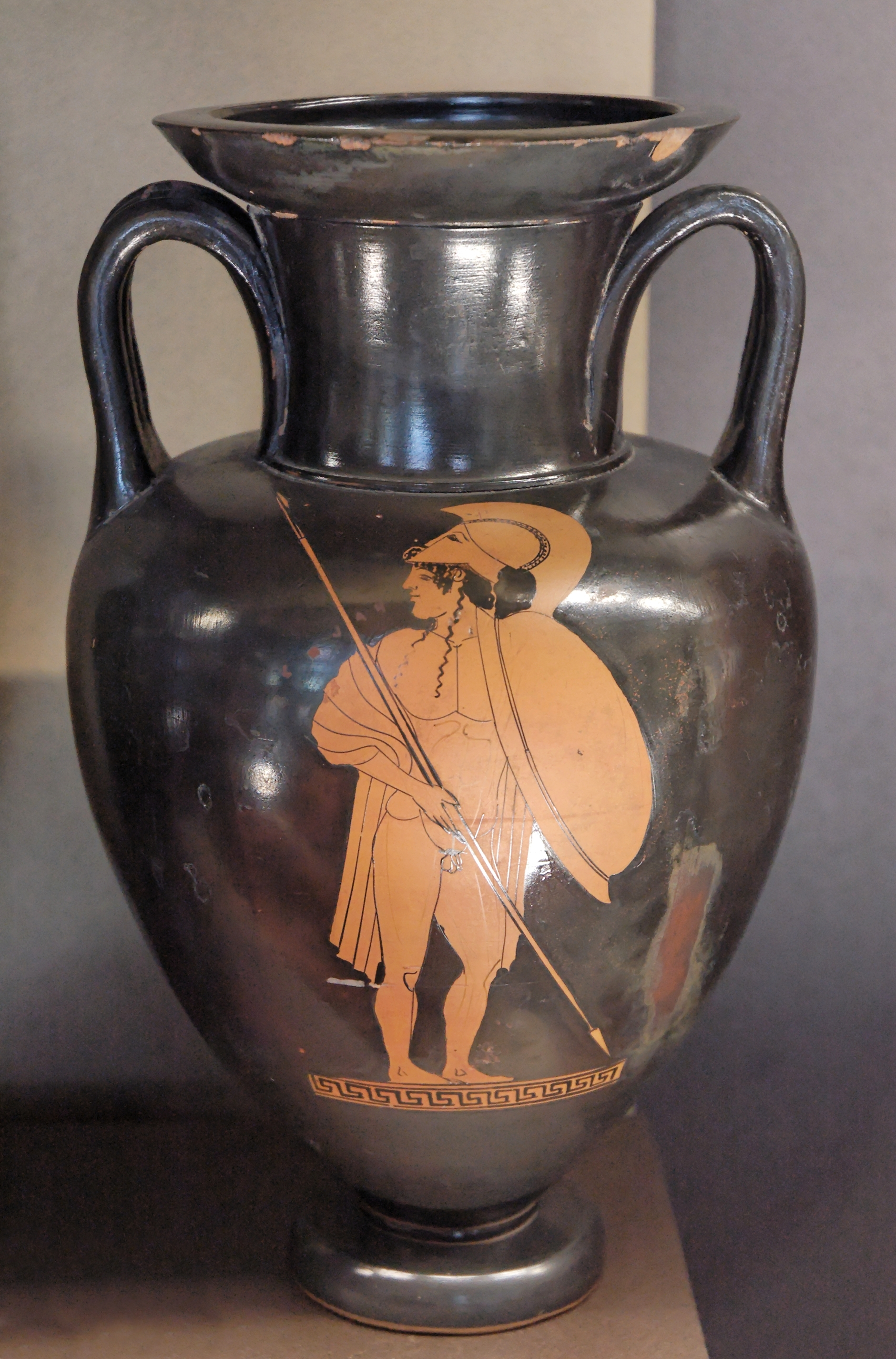
A Nolan amphora, a type with a longer and narrower neck than usual, from Nola

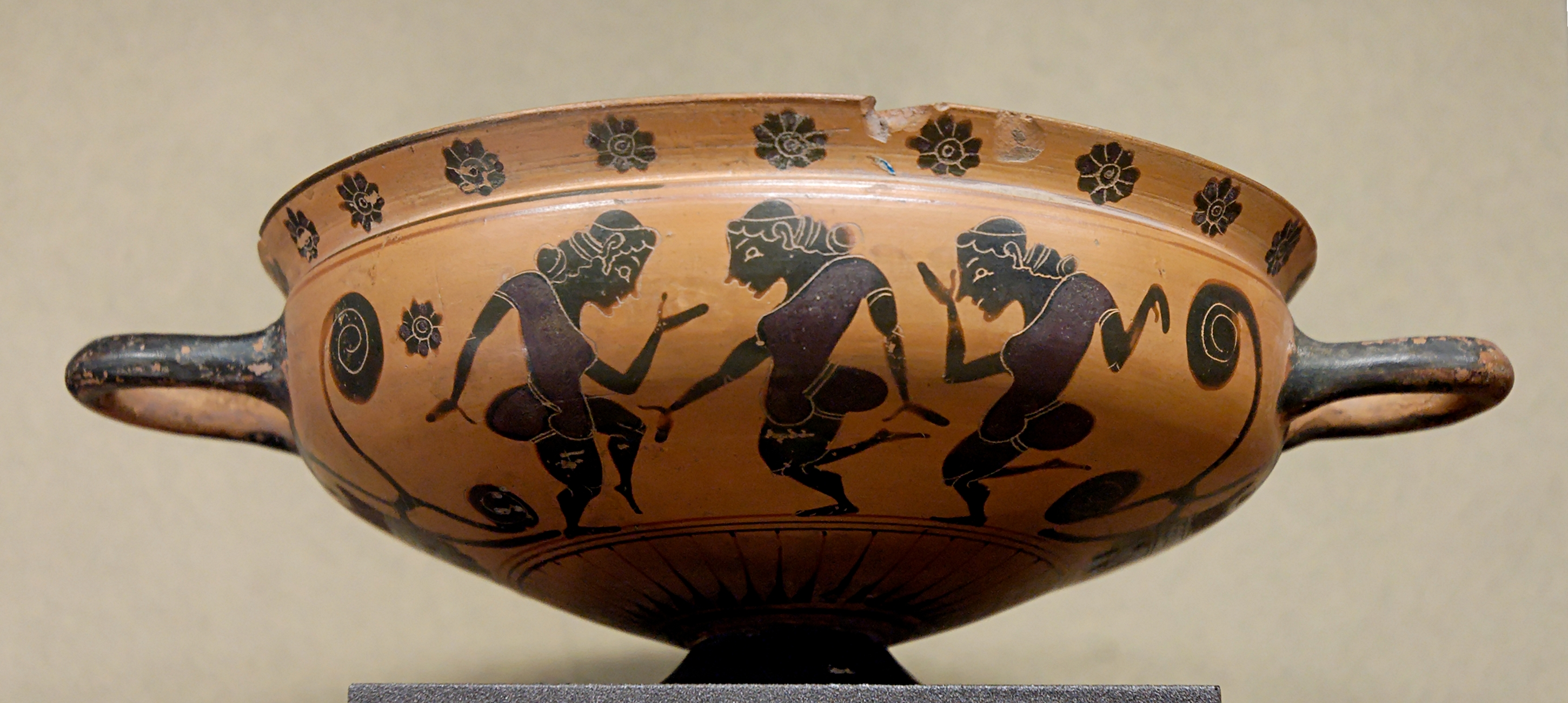
Attic komast cup, a variety of kylix, Louvre

Diagram of the parts of a typical Athenian vase, in this case a volute krater

The pottery of ancient Greece has a long history and the form of Greek vase shapes has had a continuous evolution from Minoan pottery down to the Hellenistic period. As Gisela Richter puts it, the forms of these vases (by convention the term "vase" has a very broad meaning in the field, covering anything that is a vessel of some sort) find their "happiest expression" in the 5th and 6th centuries BC, yet it has been possible to date vases thanks to the variation in a form’s shape over time, a fact particularly useful when dating unpainted or plain black-gloss ware.

The task of naming Greek vase shapes is by no means a straightforward one. The endeavour by archaeologists to match vase forms with those names that have come down to us from Greek literature began with Theodor Panofka’s 1829 book Recherches sur les veritables noms des vases grecs, whose confident assertion that he had rediscovered the ancient nomenclature was quickly disputed by Gerhard and Letronne.

A few surviving vases were labelled with their names in antiquity; these included a hydria depicted on the François Vase and a kylix that declares, “I am the decorated kylix of lovely Phito” (BM, B450). Vases in use are sometimes depicted in paintings on vases, which can help scholars interpret written descriptions. Much of our written information about Greek pots come from such late writers as Athenaios and Pollux and other lexicographers who described vases unknown to them, and their accounts are often contradictory or confused. With those caveats, the names of Greek vases are fairly well settled, even if such names are a matter of convention rather than historical fact.

The following vases are mostly Attic, from the 5th and 6th centuries, and follow the Beazley naming convention. Many shapes derive from metal vessels, especially in silver, which survive in far smaller numbers. Some pottery vases were probably intended as cheaper substitutes for these, either for use or to be placed as grave goods. Some terms, especially among the types of kylix or drinking cup, combine a shape and a type or location of decoration, as in the band cup, eye cup and others. Some terms are defined by function as much as shape, such as the aryballos, which later potters turned into all sorts of fancy novelty shapes.

== Overview ==
Greek pottery may be divided into four broad categories, given here with common types:

- storage and transport vessels, including the amphora, pithos, pelike, hydria, stamnos, pyxis,
- mixing vessels, mainly for symposia or male drinking parties, including the krater, dinos, and kyathos,
- jugs and cups, several types of kylix also just called cups, kantharos, phiale, skyphos, rhyton, mastos, and jug-types oinochoe and loutrophoros,
- vases for oils, perfumes and cosmetics, including the large lekythos, and the small aryballos, alabastron, and askos.

In addition, various standard types might be used as external grave-markers (in extra-large versions, sometimes in stone), funerary urns containing ashes, or as grave goods. Several types of vase, especially the taller ones, could be made in "plastic" forms (also called "figure vases" or "relief vases") where the body was shaped sculpturally (somewhat in the manner of the modern Toby jug), typically to form a human head.

== Vase shapes ==
Storage

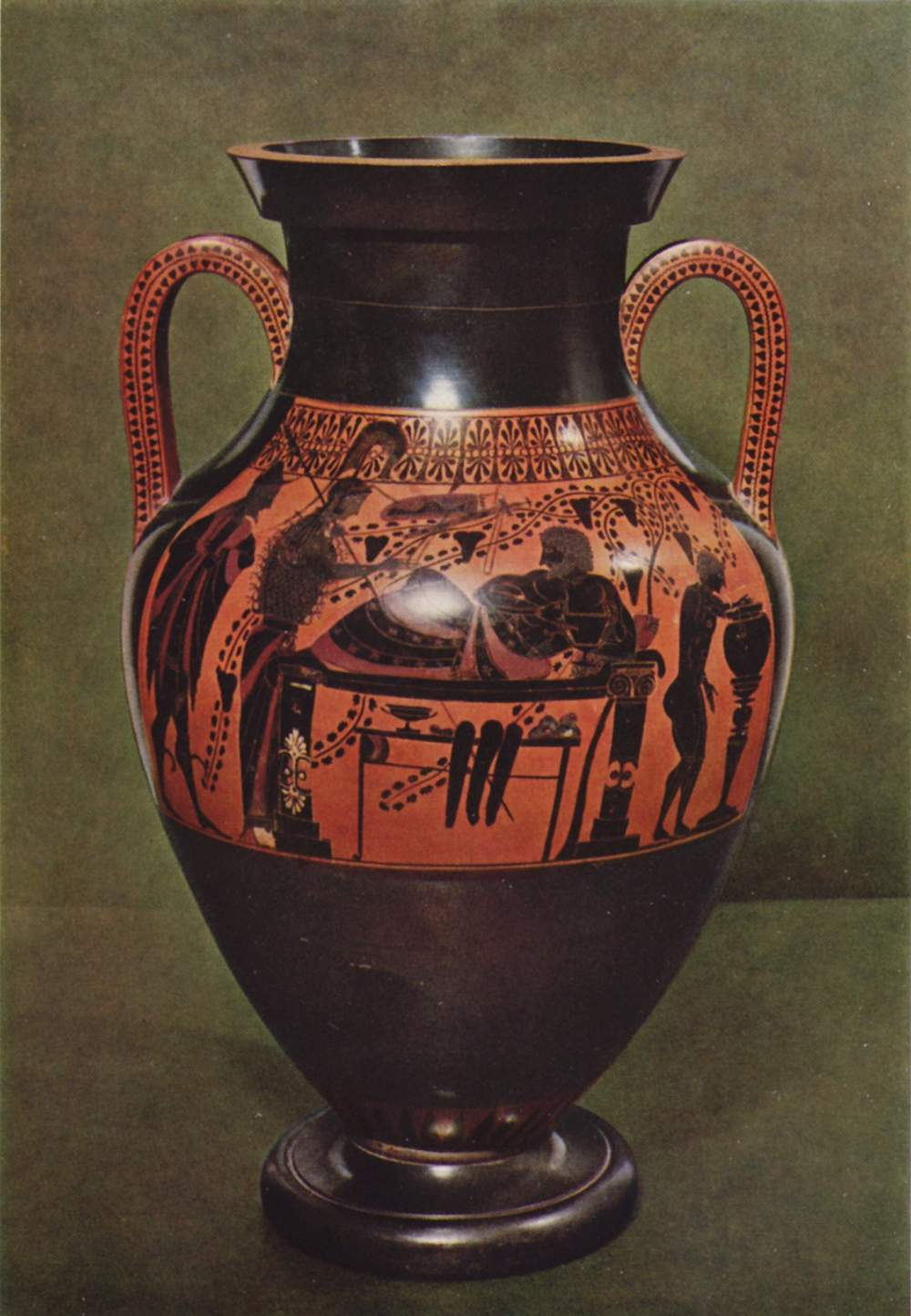
Amphora type A, c. 520 BC.

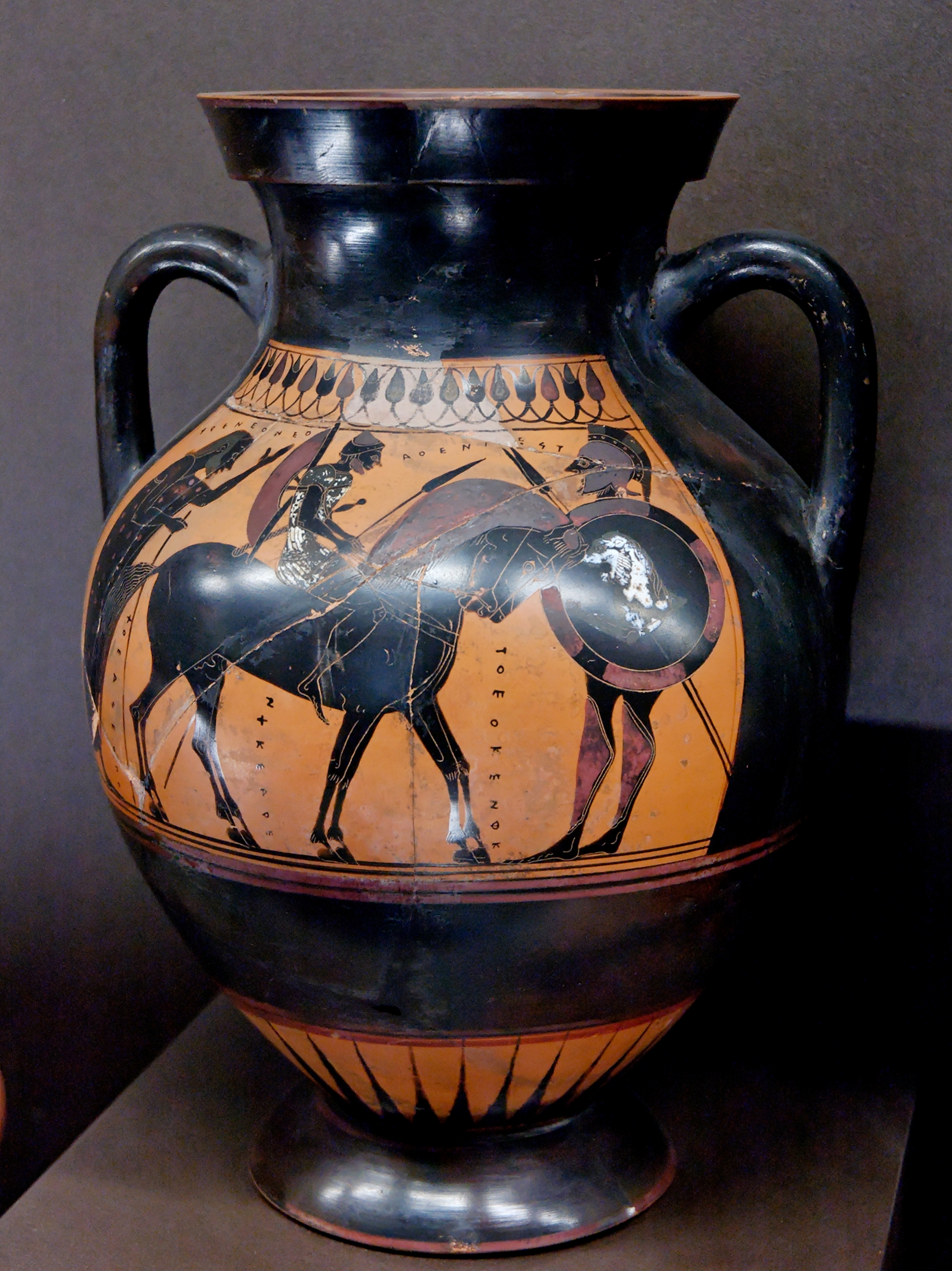
Amphora type B.

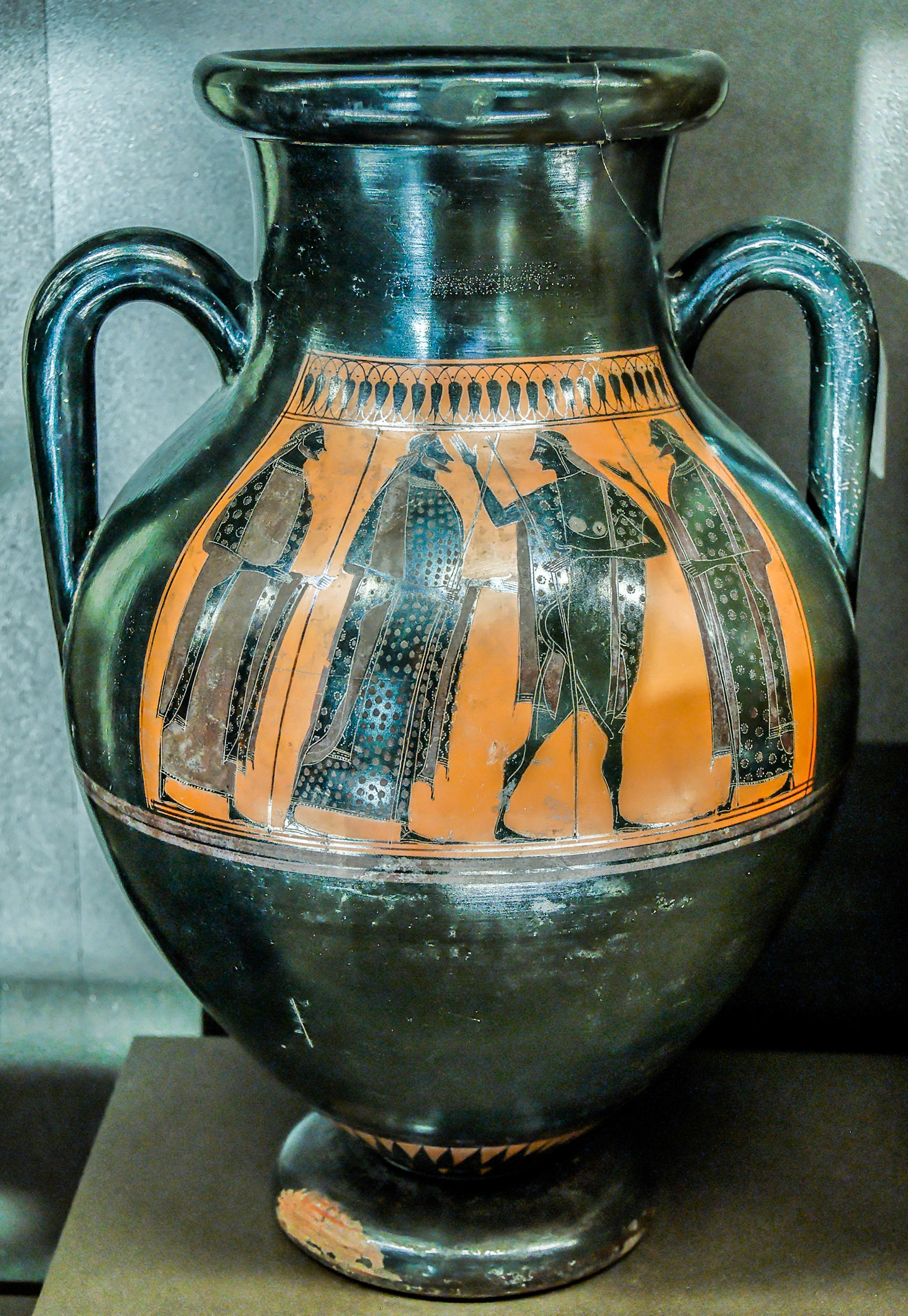
Amphora type C.

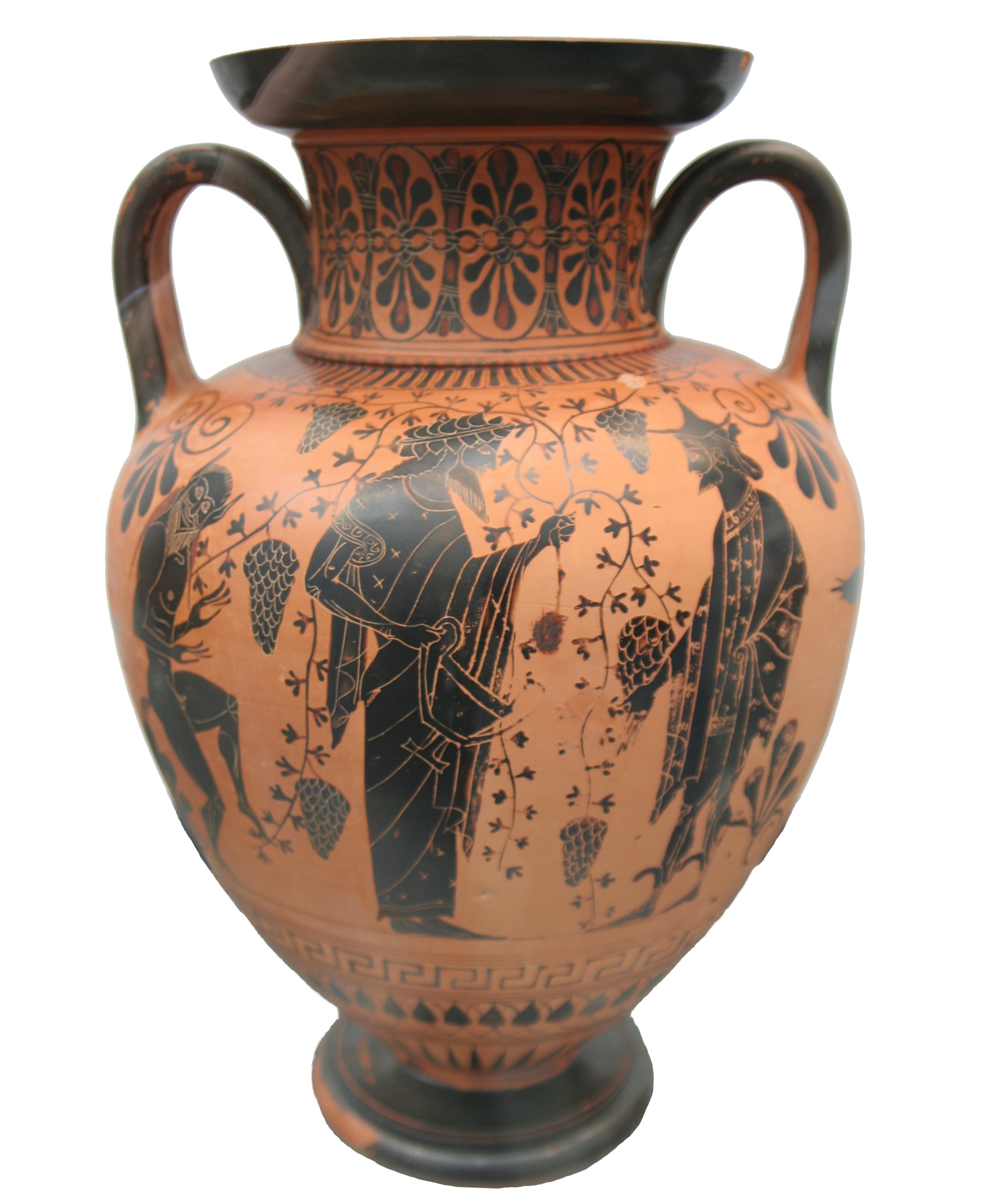
Neck amphora, c. 520 BC.

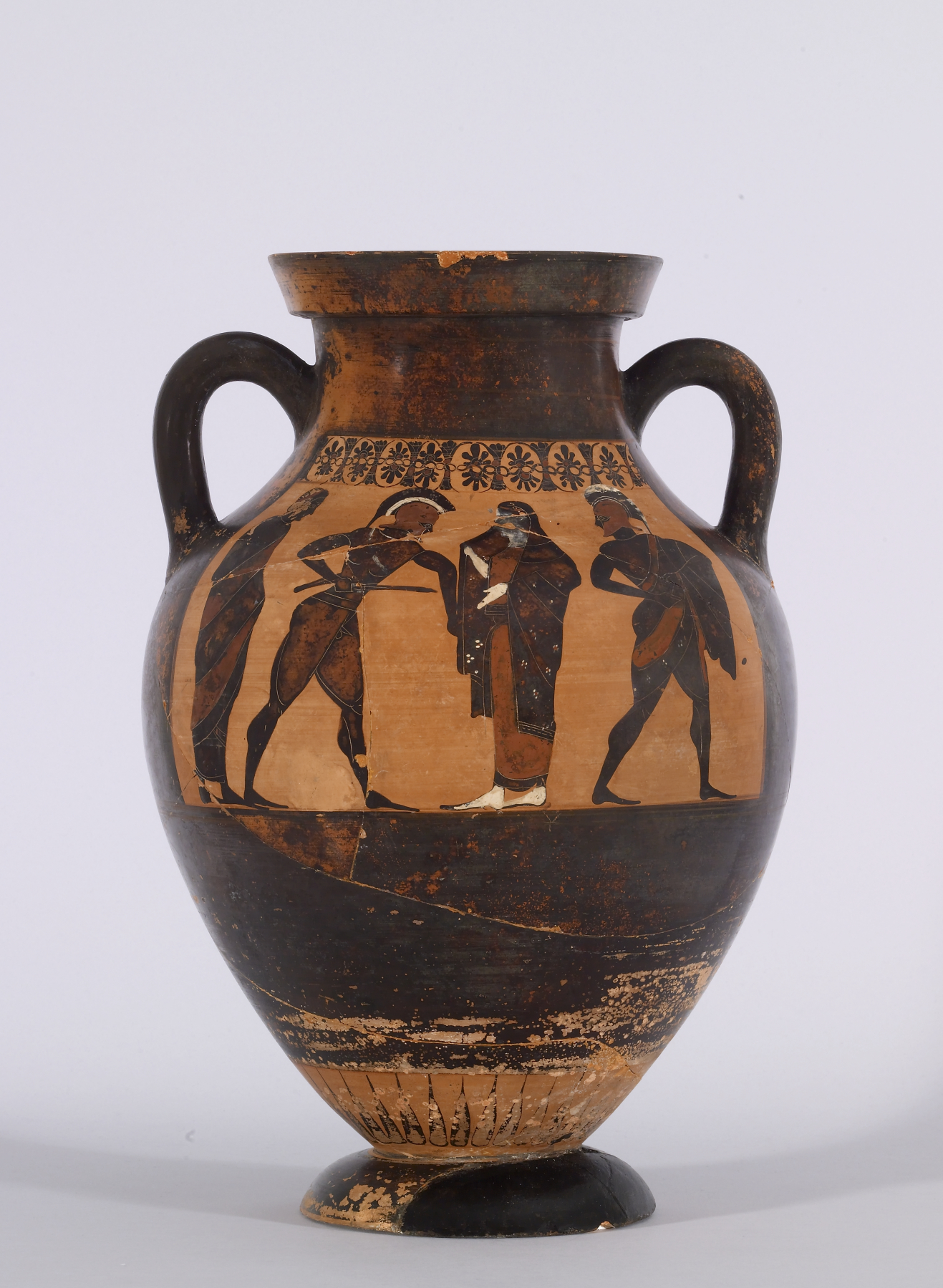
Belly amphora, with hardly a distinct neck

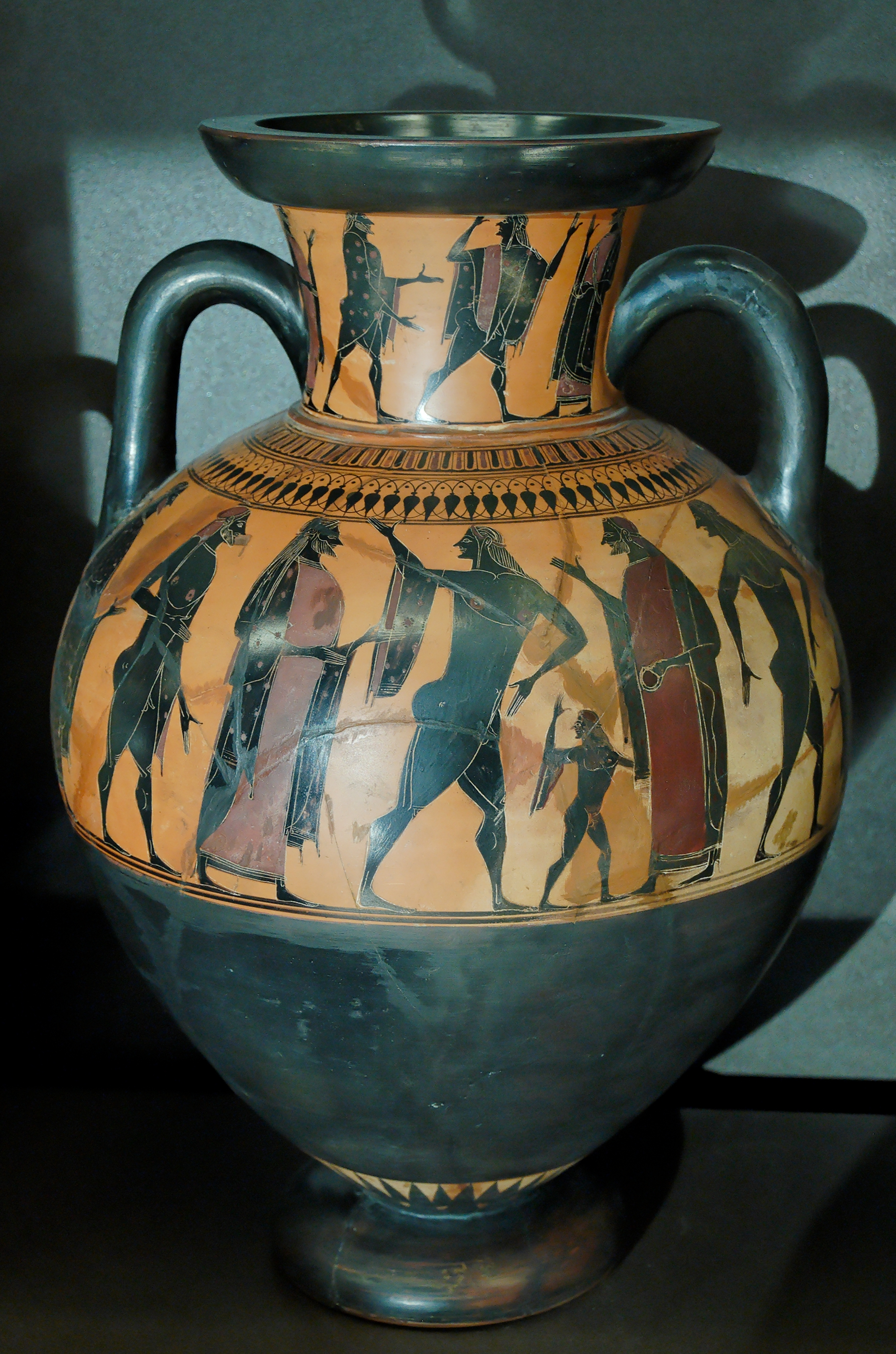
Ovoid neck amphora

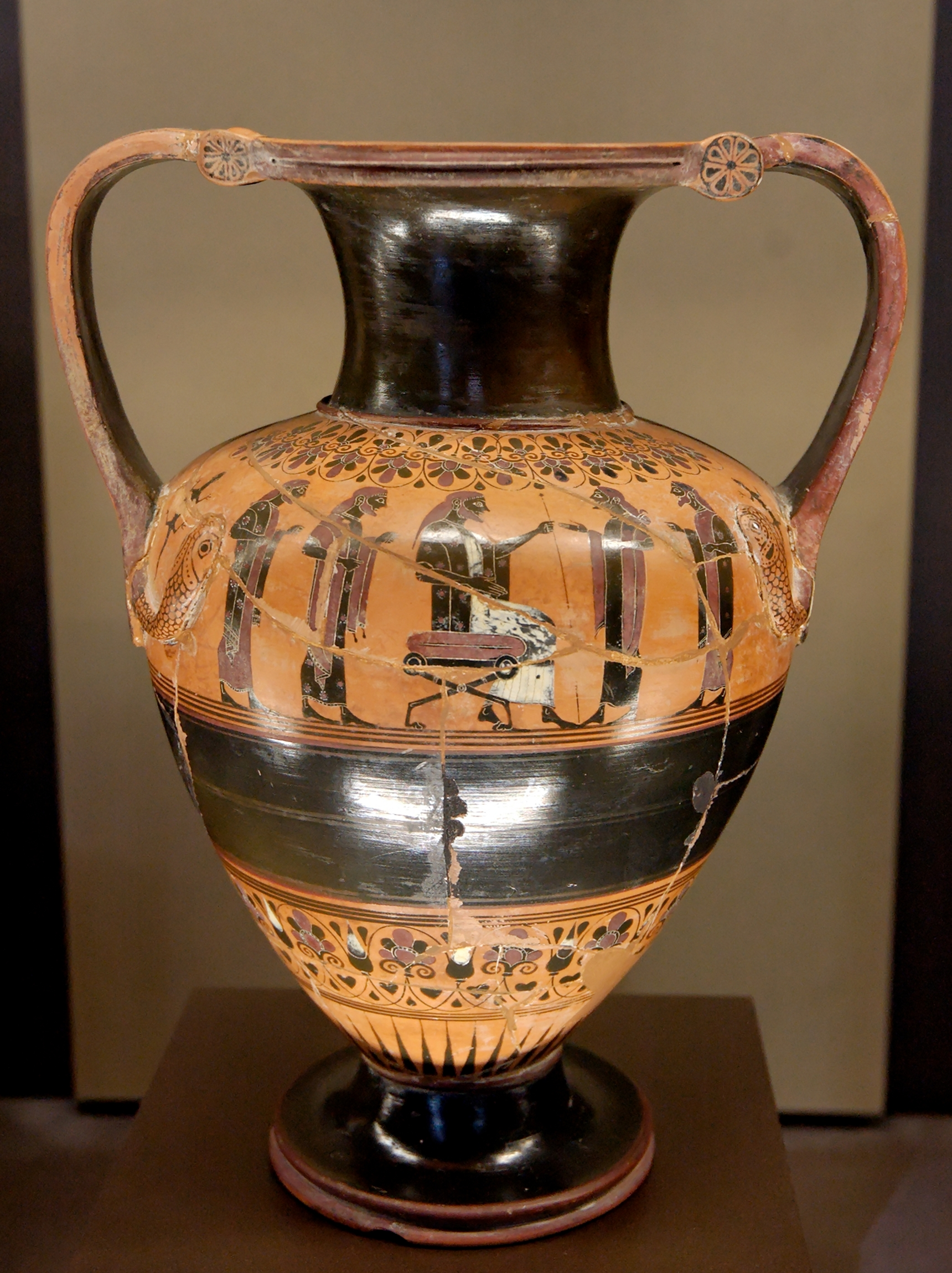
Nikosthenic amphora, c. 530 BC.

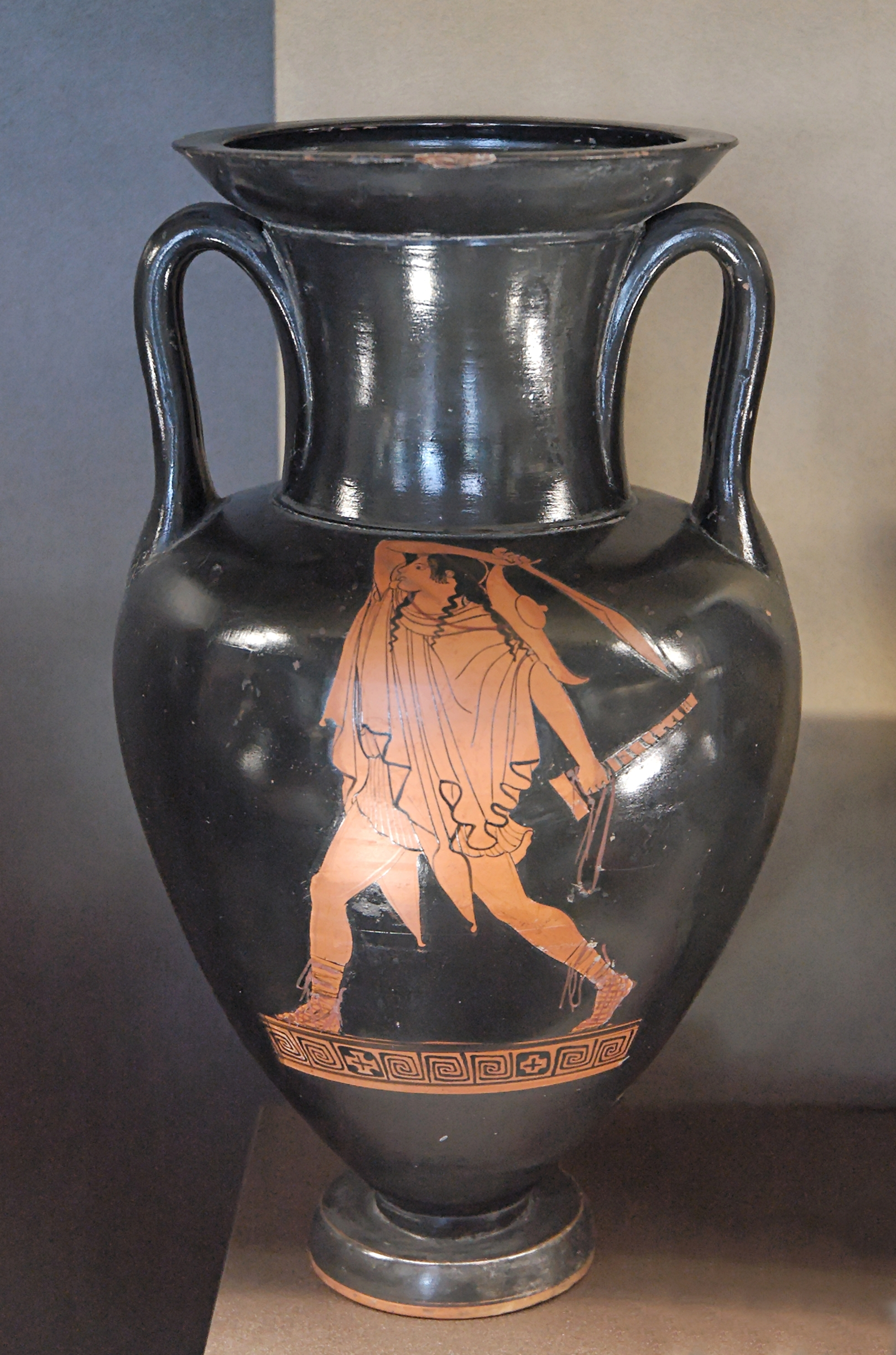
Nolan amphora

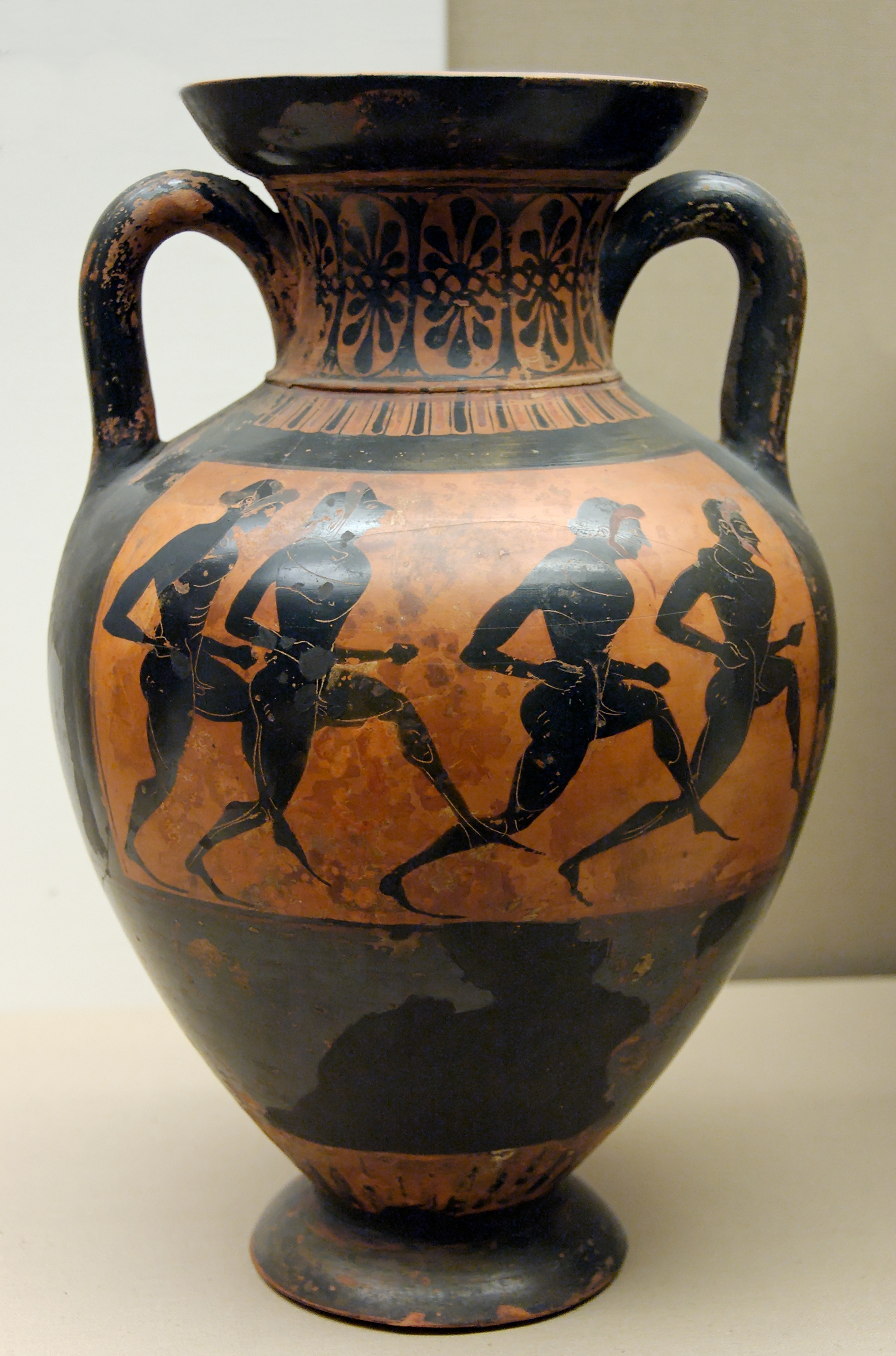
Panathenaic amphora, always large

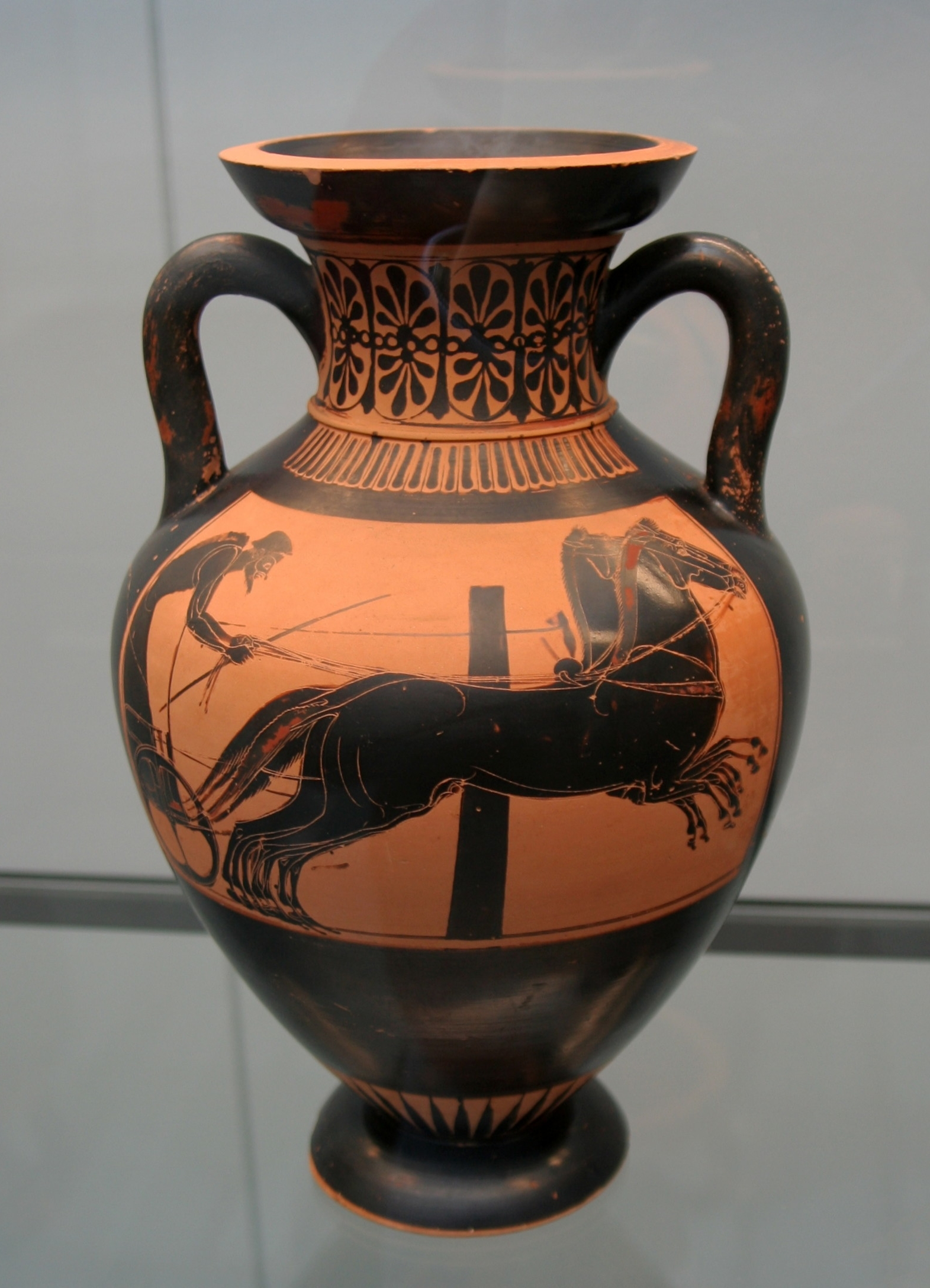
Pseudo-panathenaic amphora, c. 500 BC.

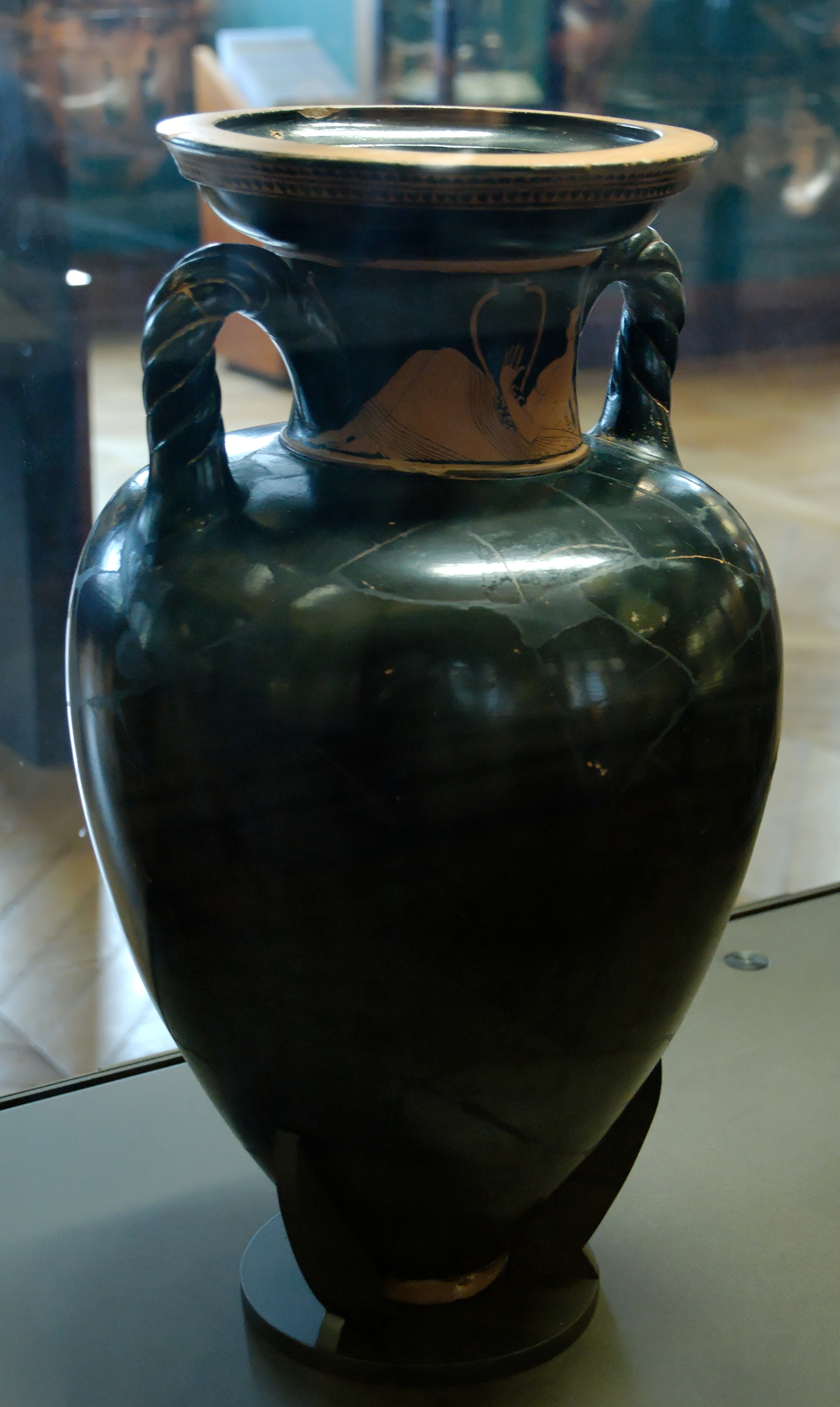
Pointed amphora

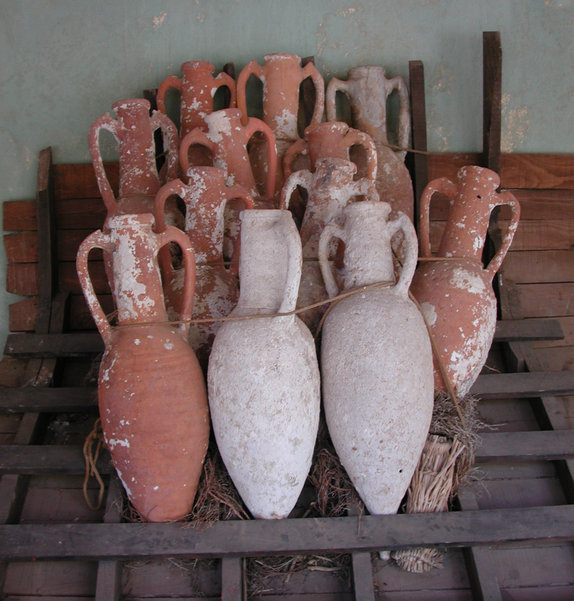
Transport amphorae

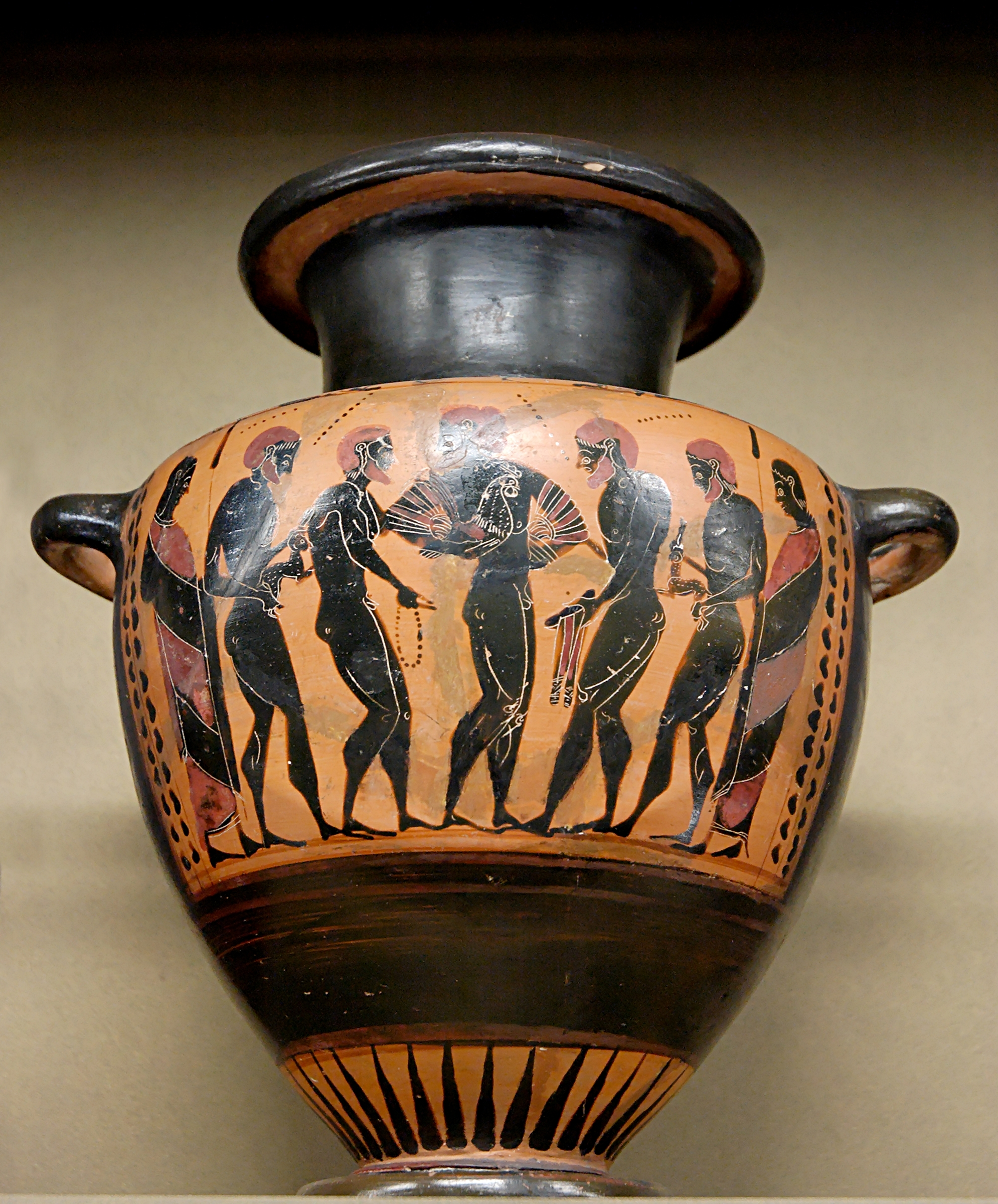
Hydria-black figure type

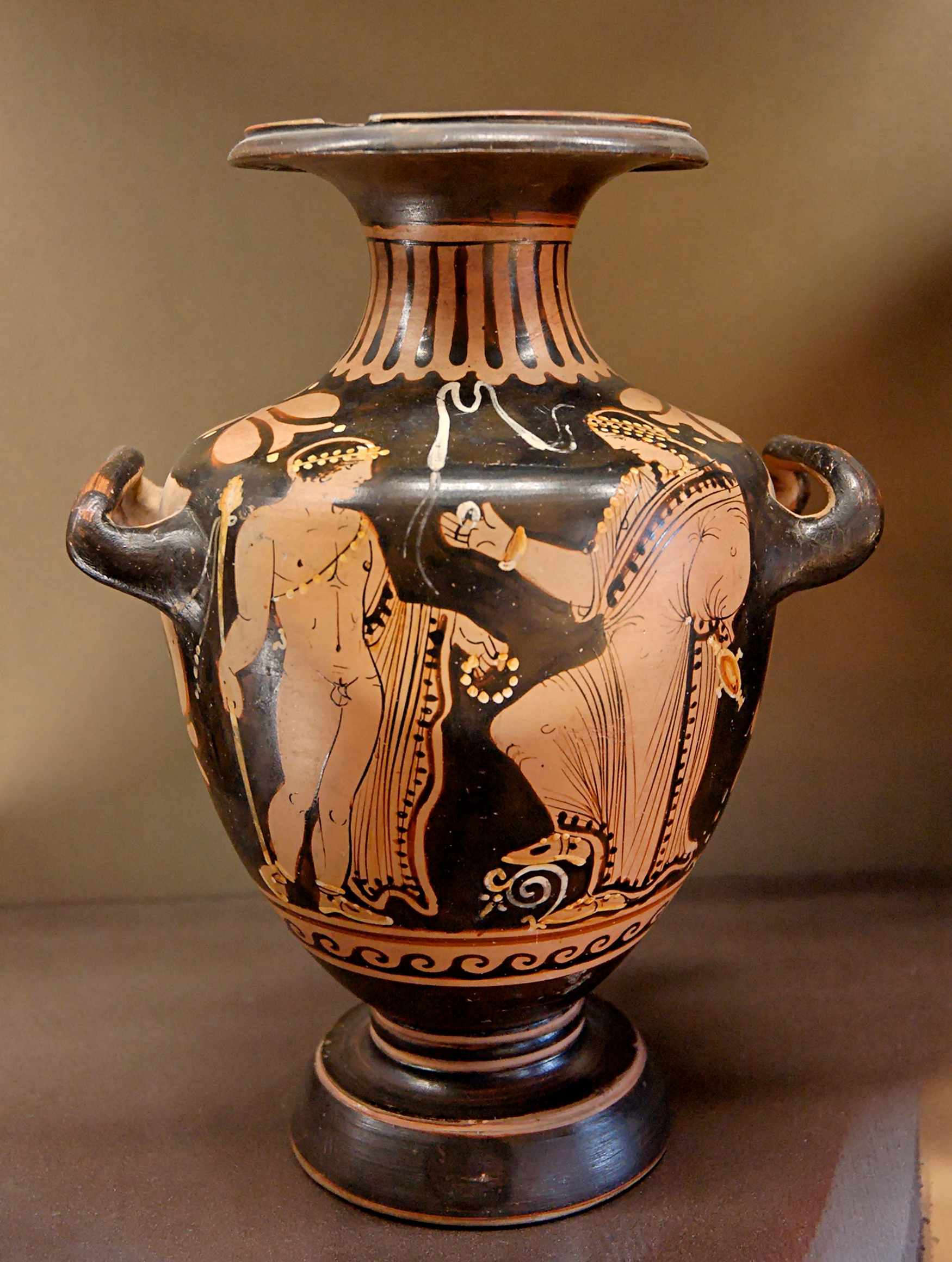
Hydria-red figure type or Kalpis

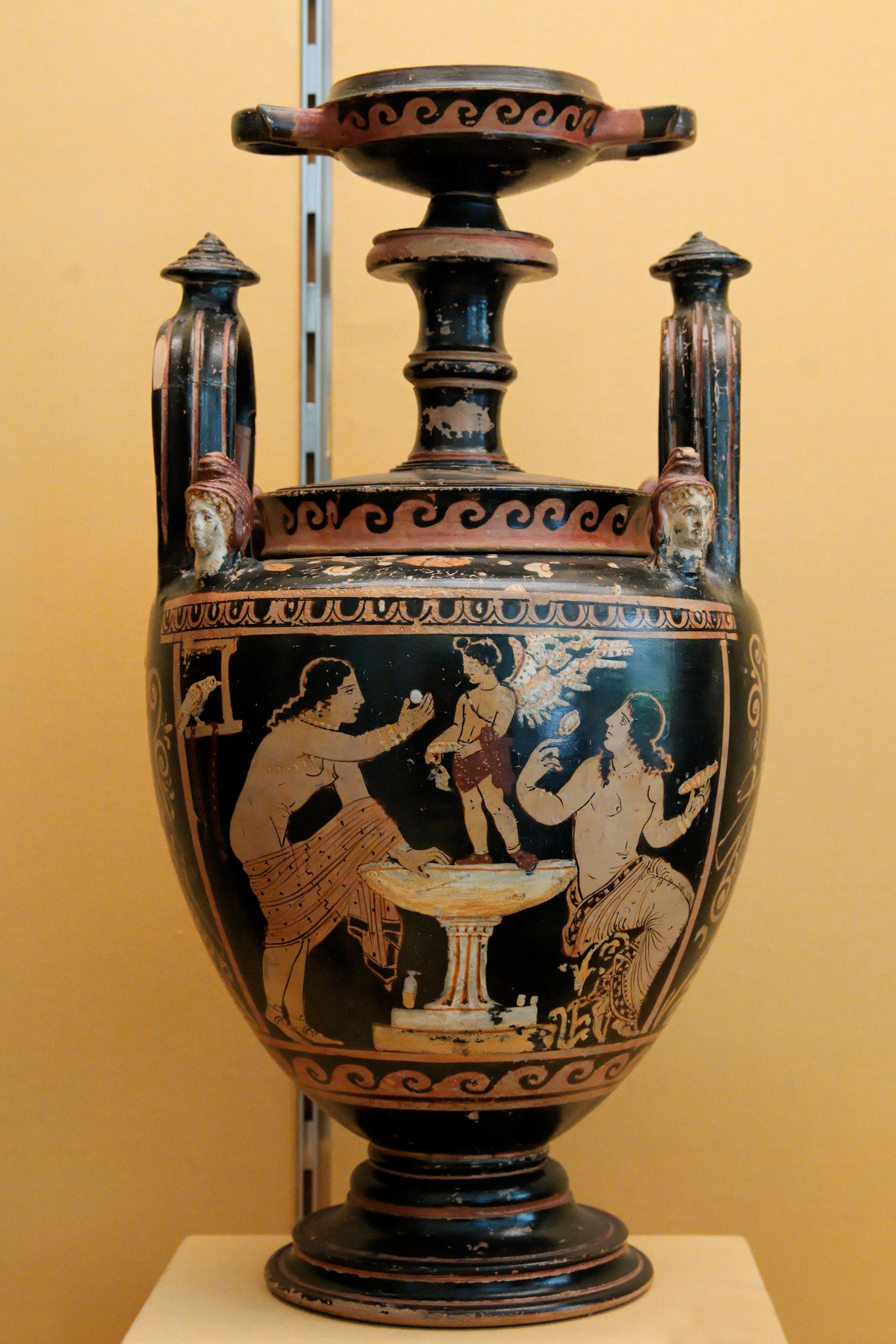
Lebes Gamikos, for weddings, c. 340 BC

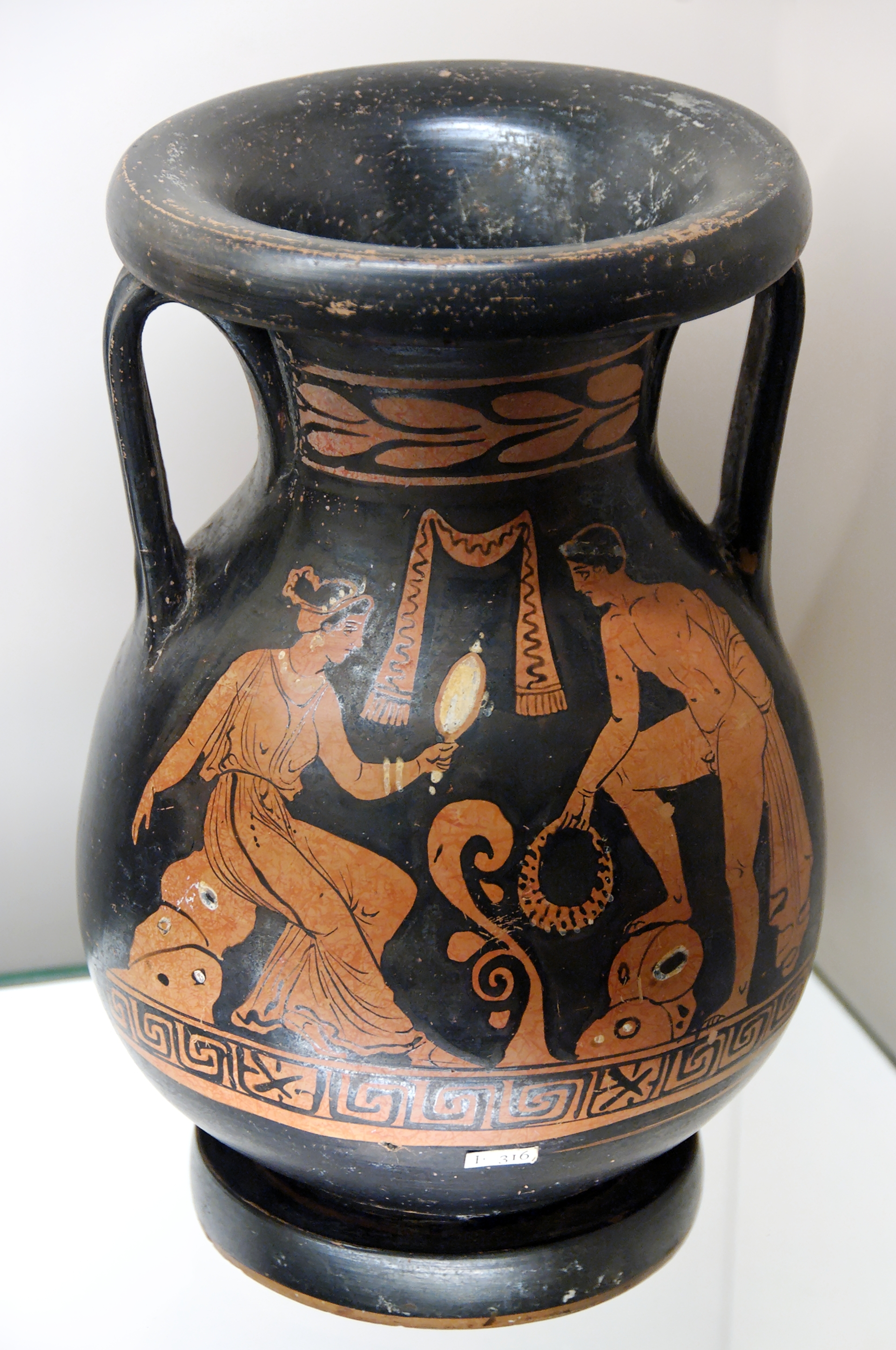
Pelike

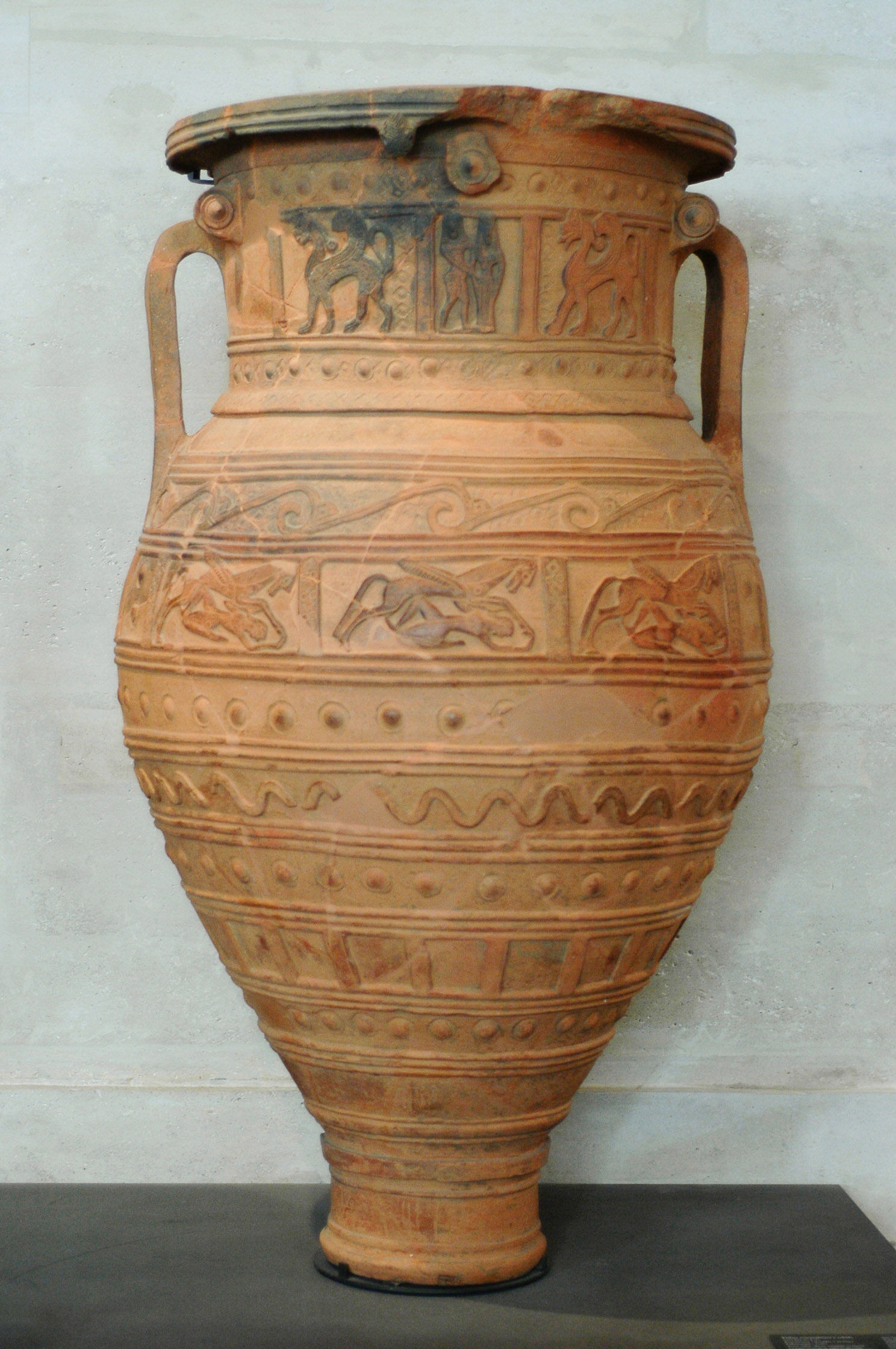
Pithos

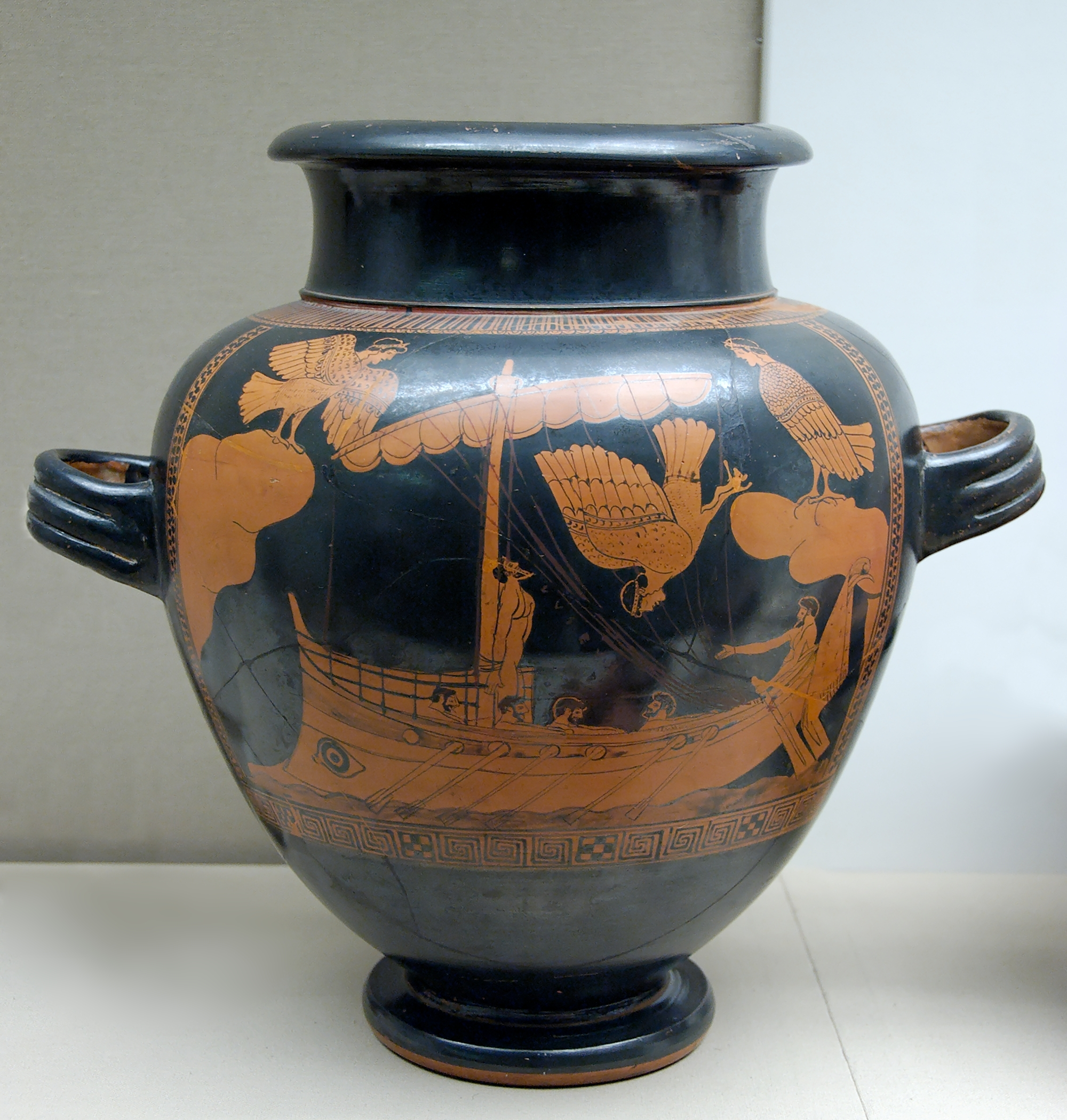
Stamnos, c. 480–470 BC.
Mixing

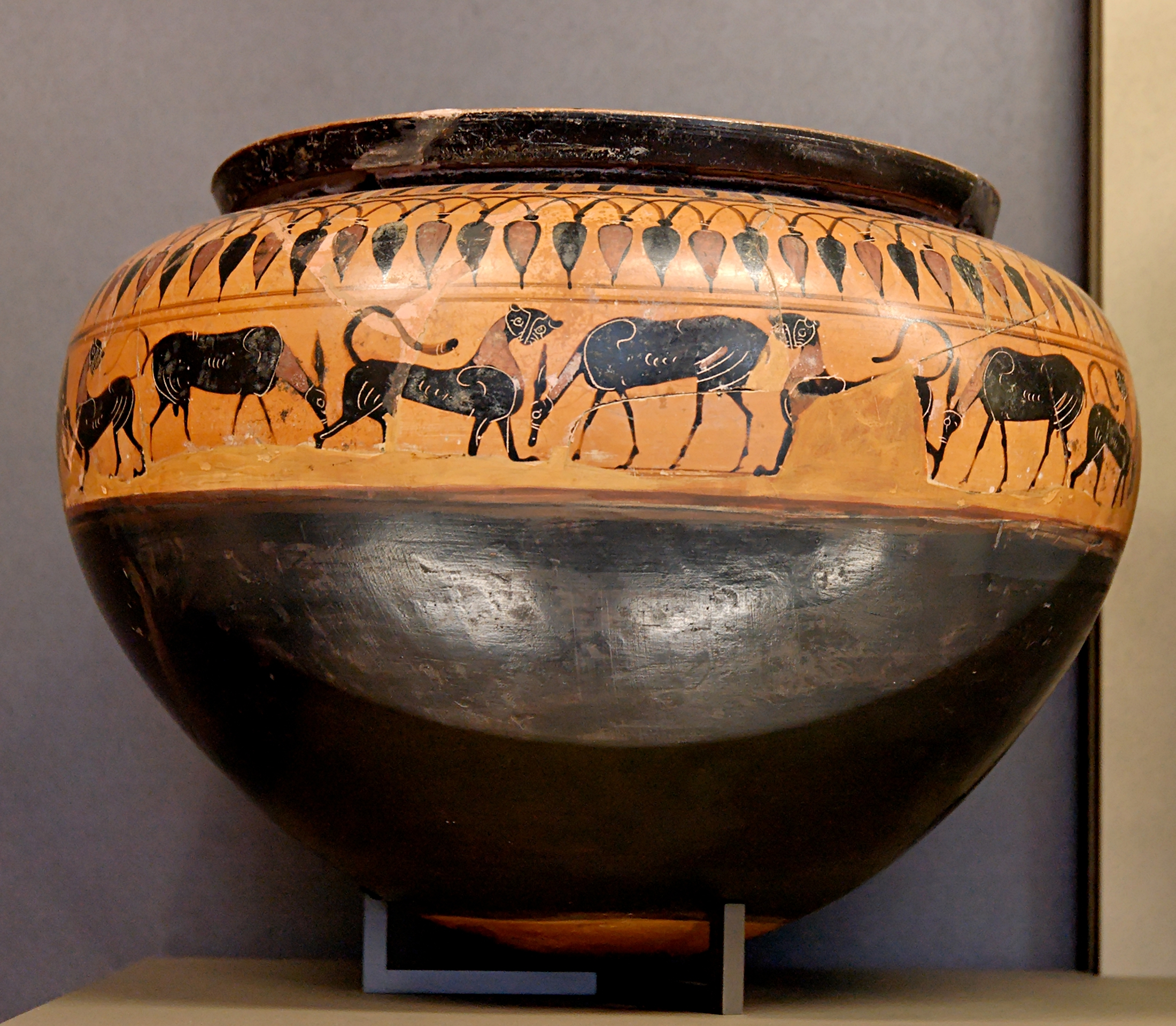
Dinos

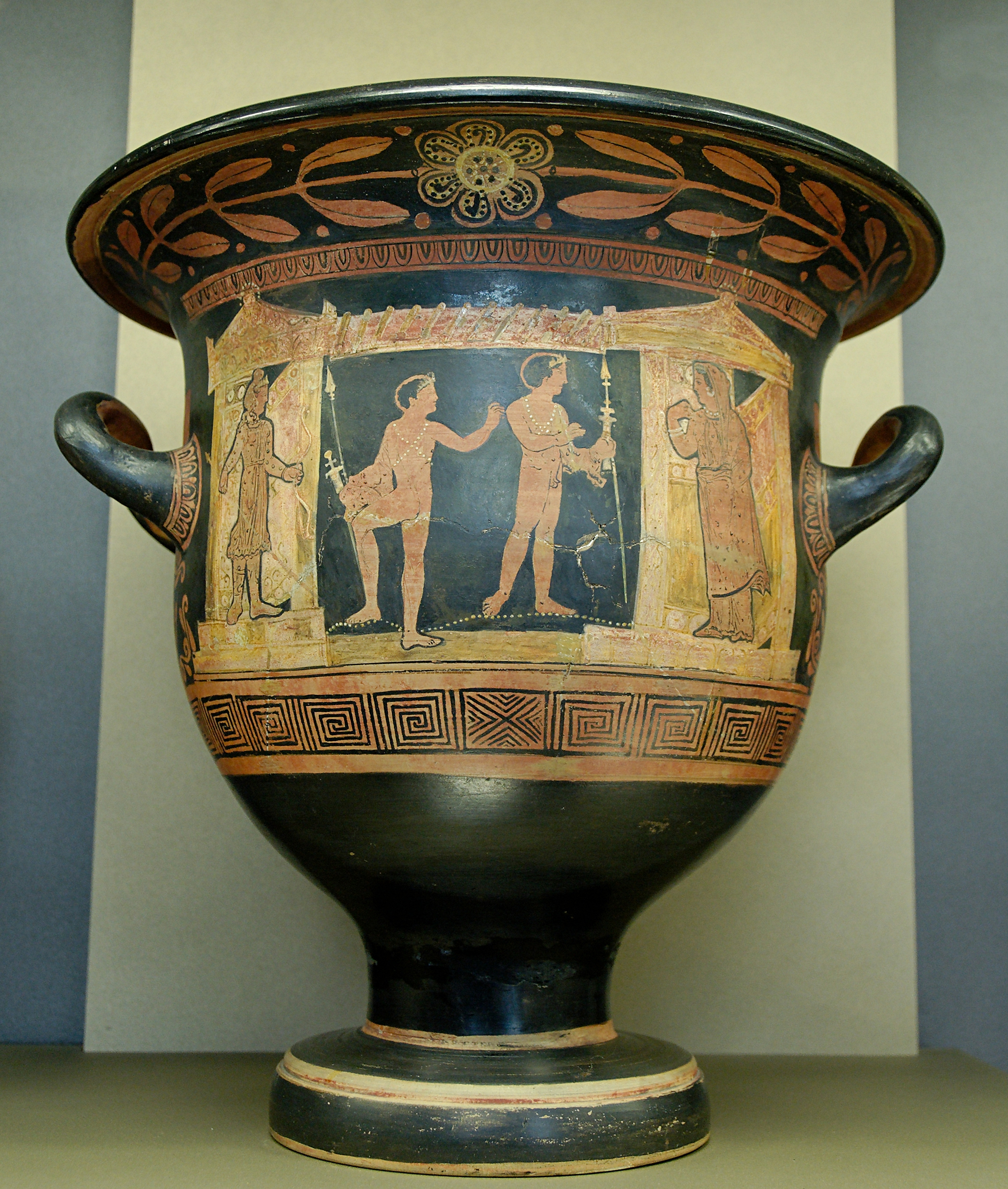
Bell krater, c 330 BC.

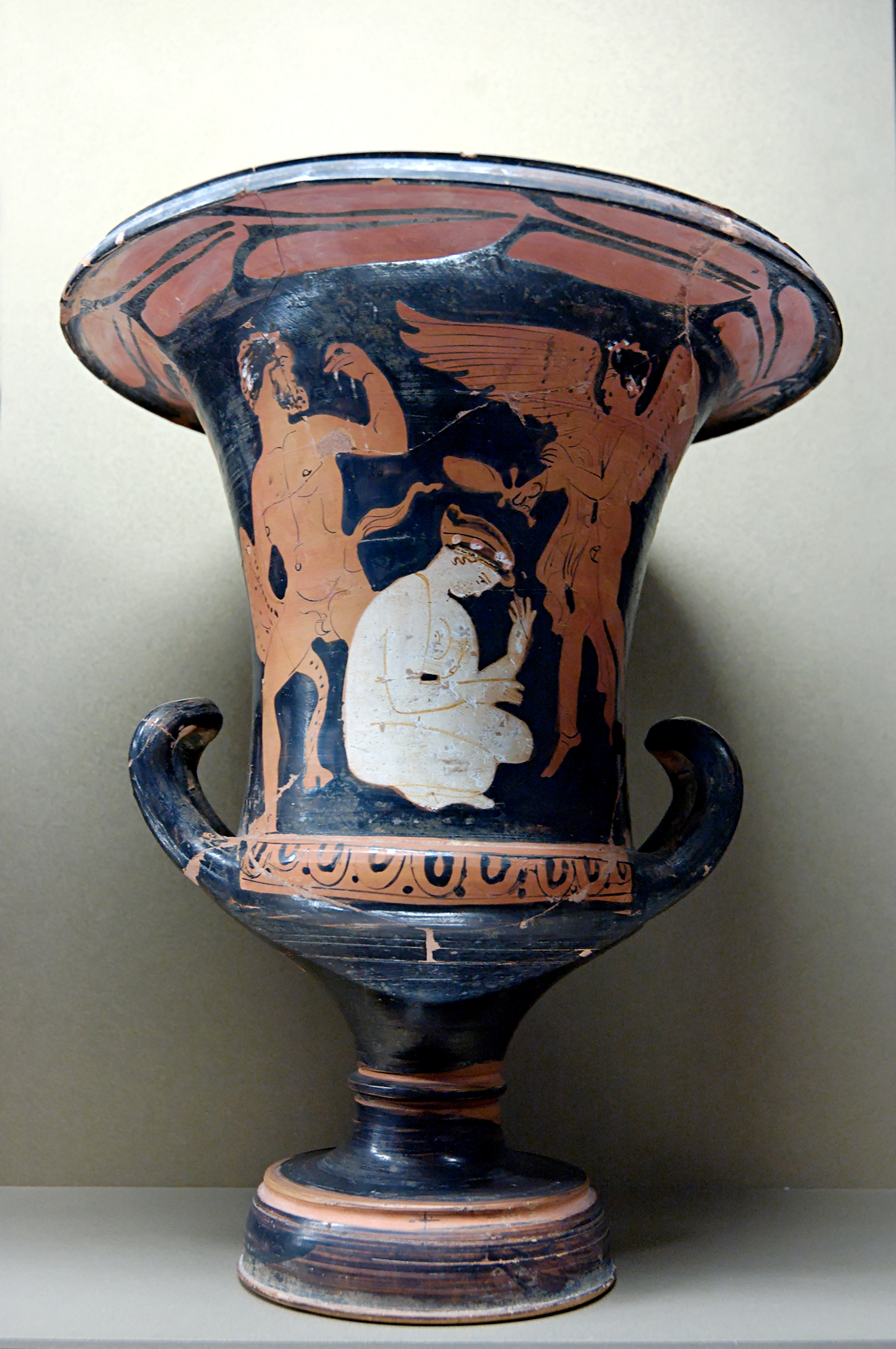
Calyx-krater, c. 510 BC.

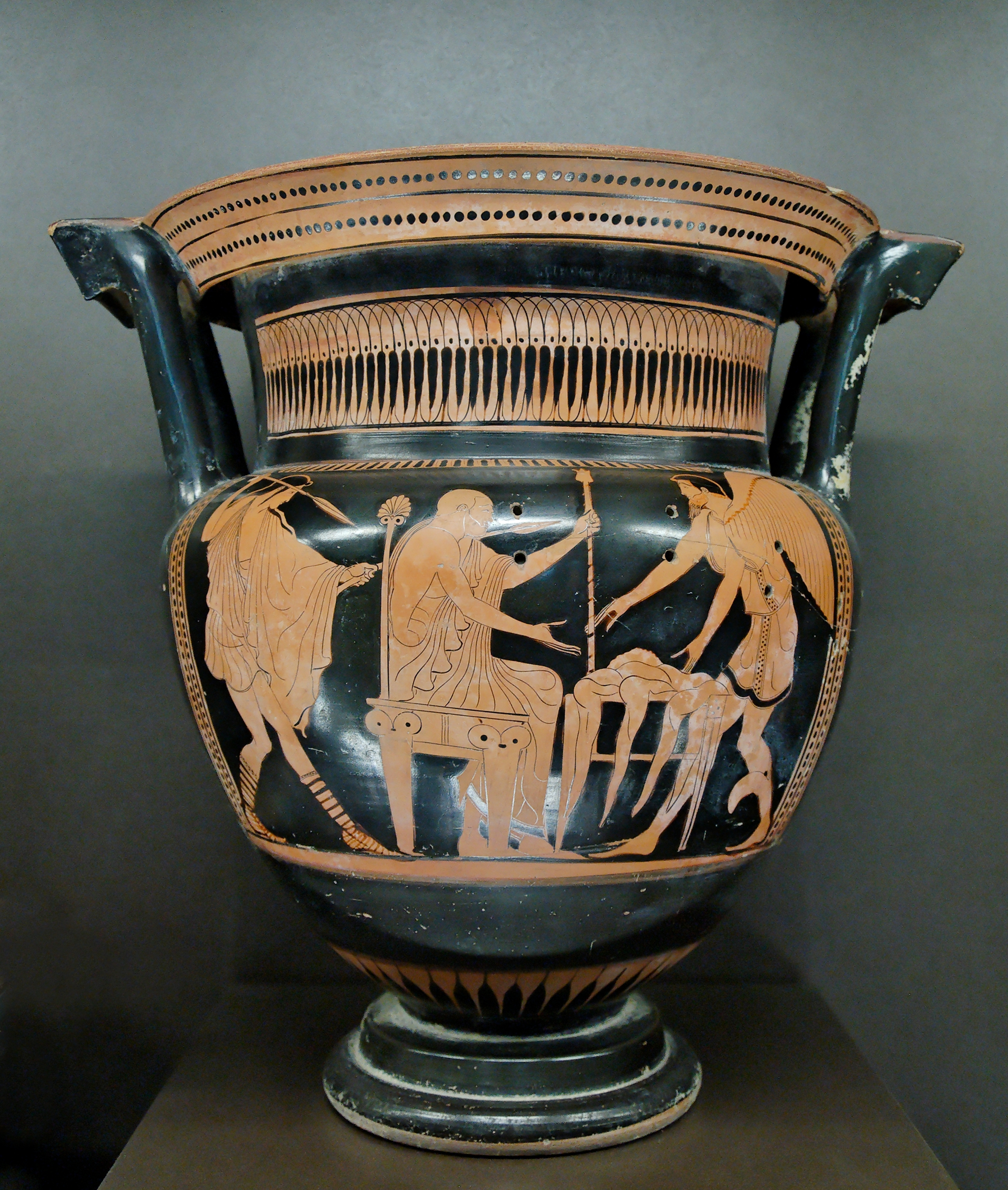
Column krater

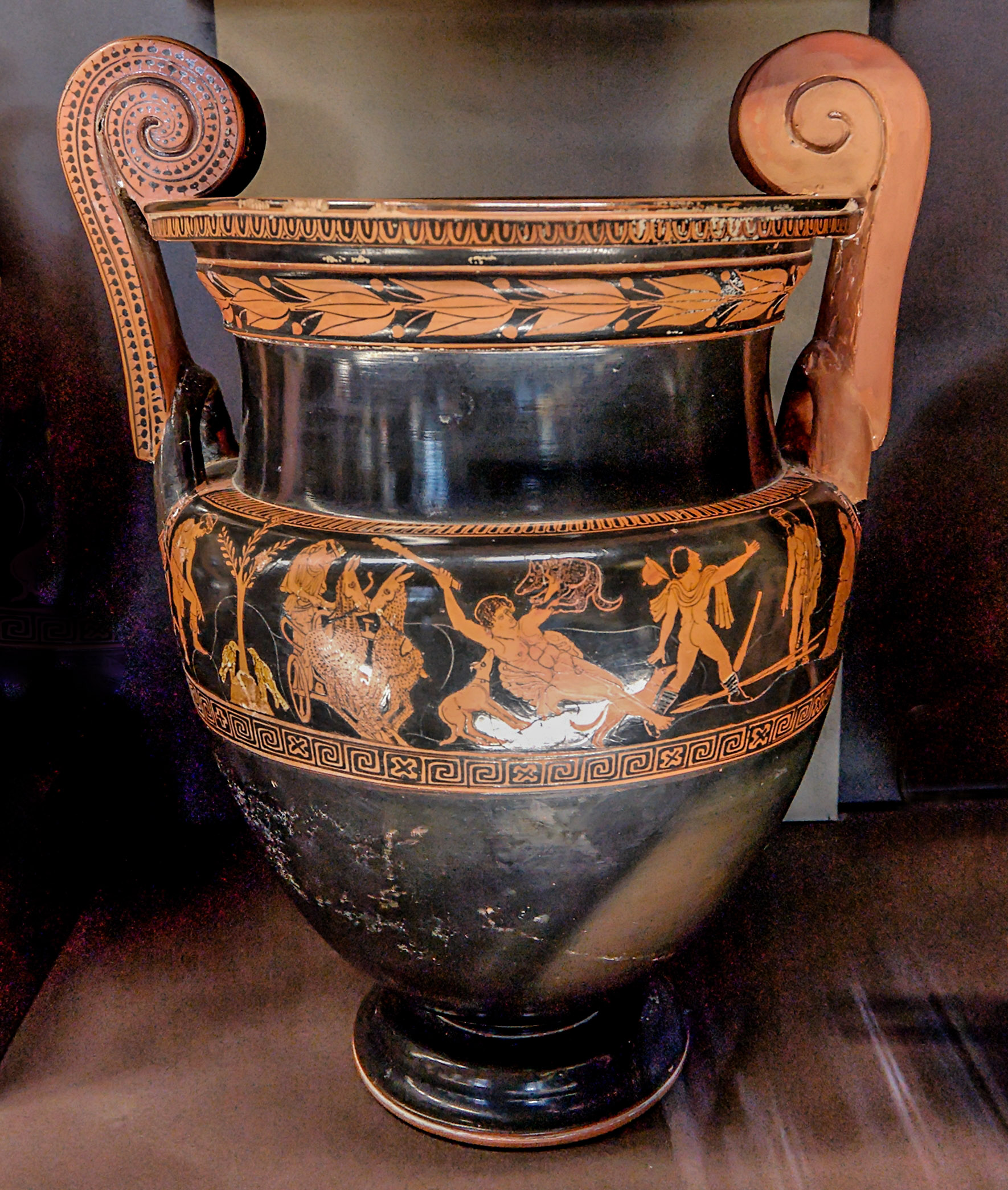
Volute krater

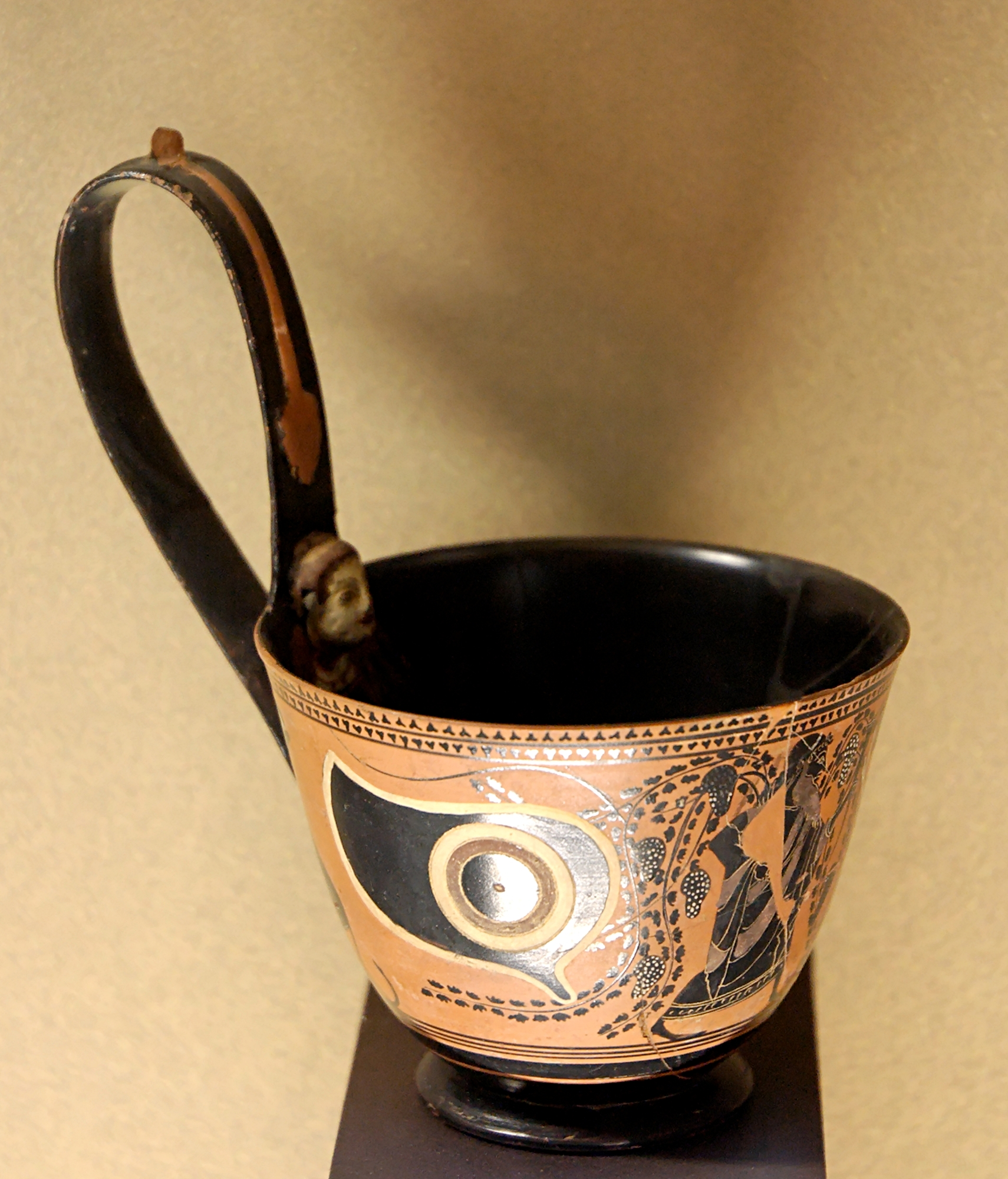
Kyathos

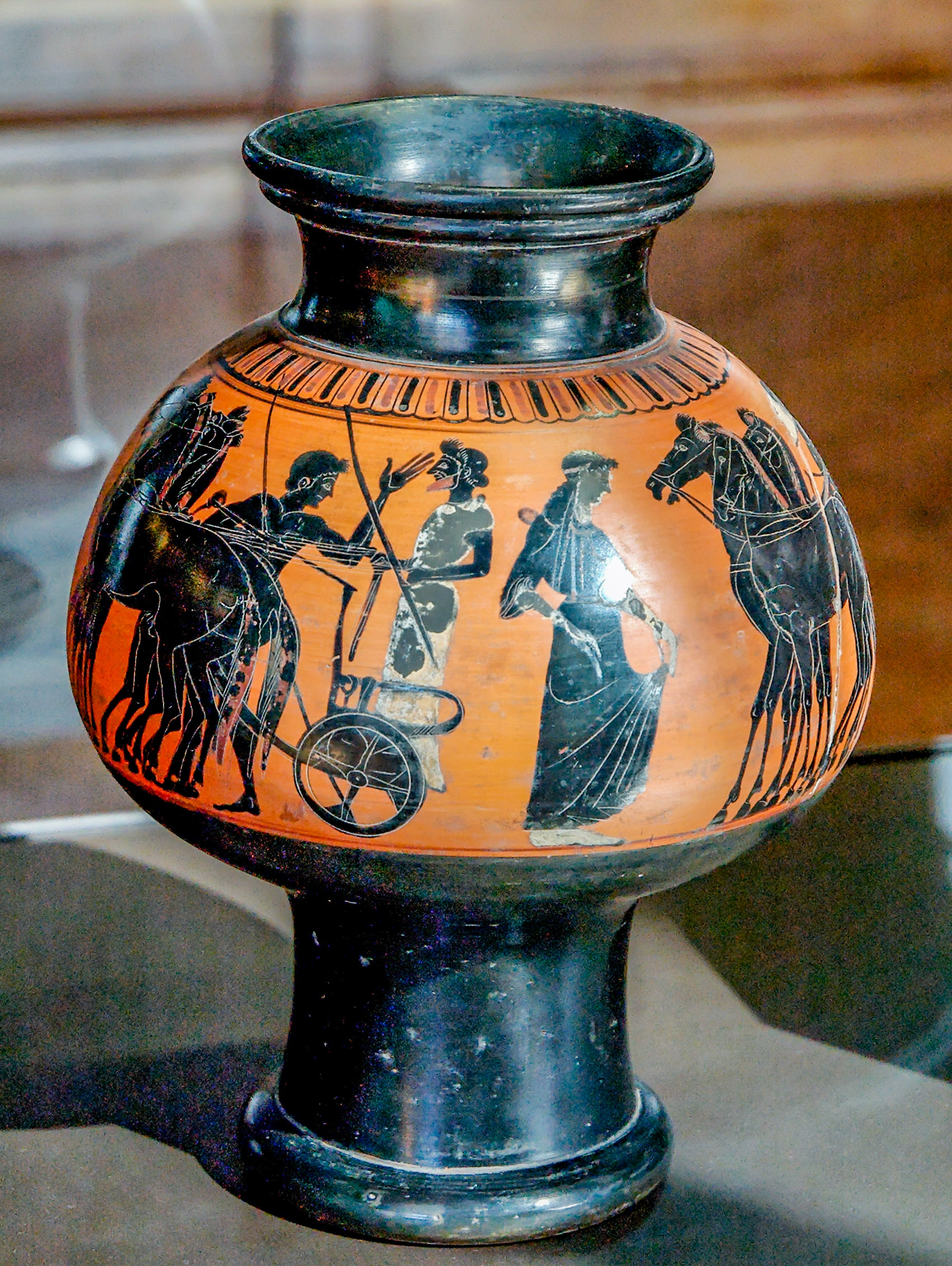
Psykter
Cups

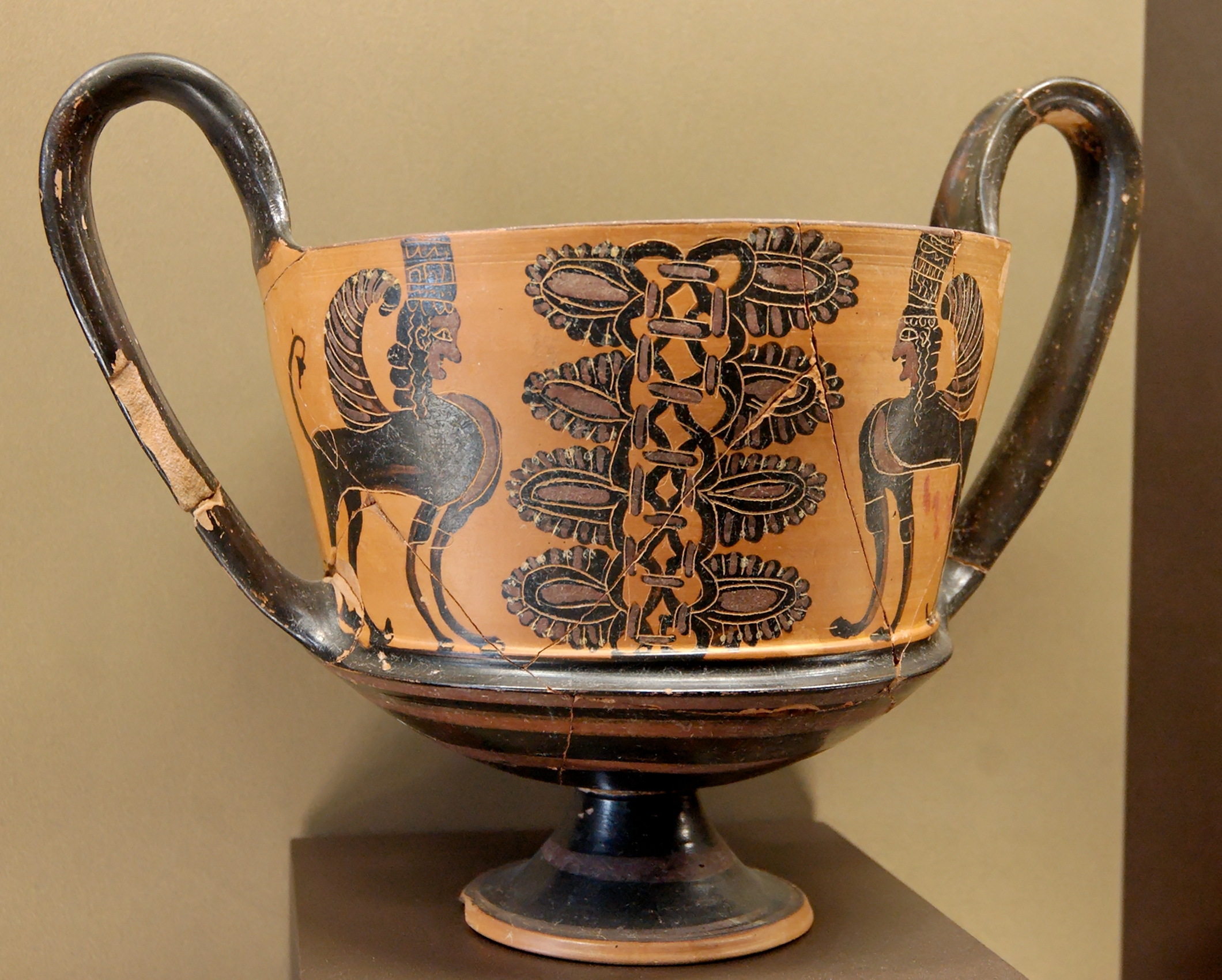
Kantharos type A

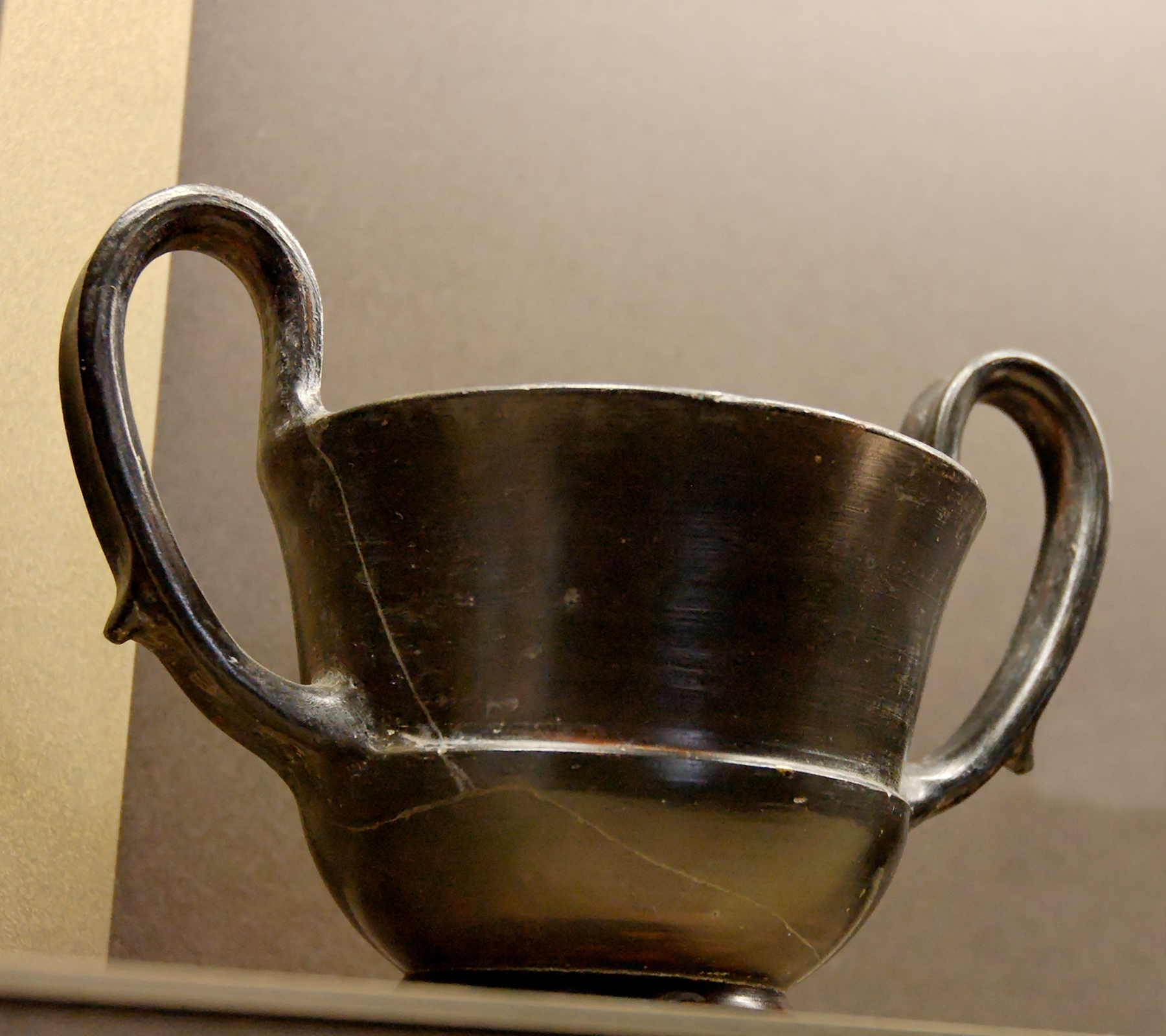
Kantharos type B

Kylix type A

Kylix type B

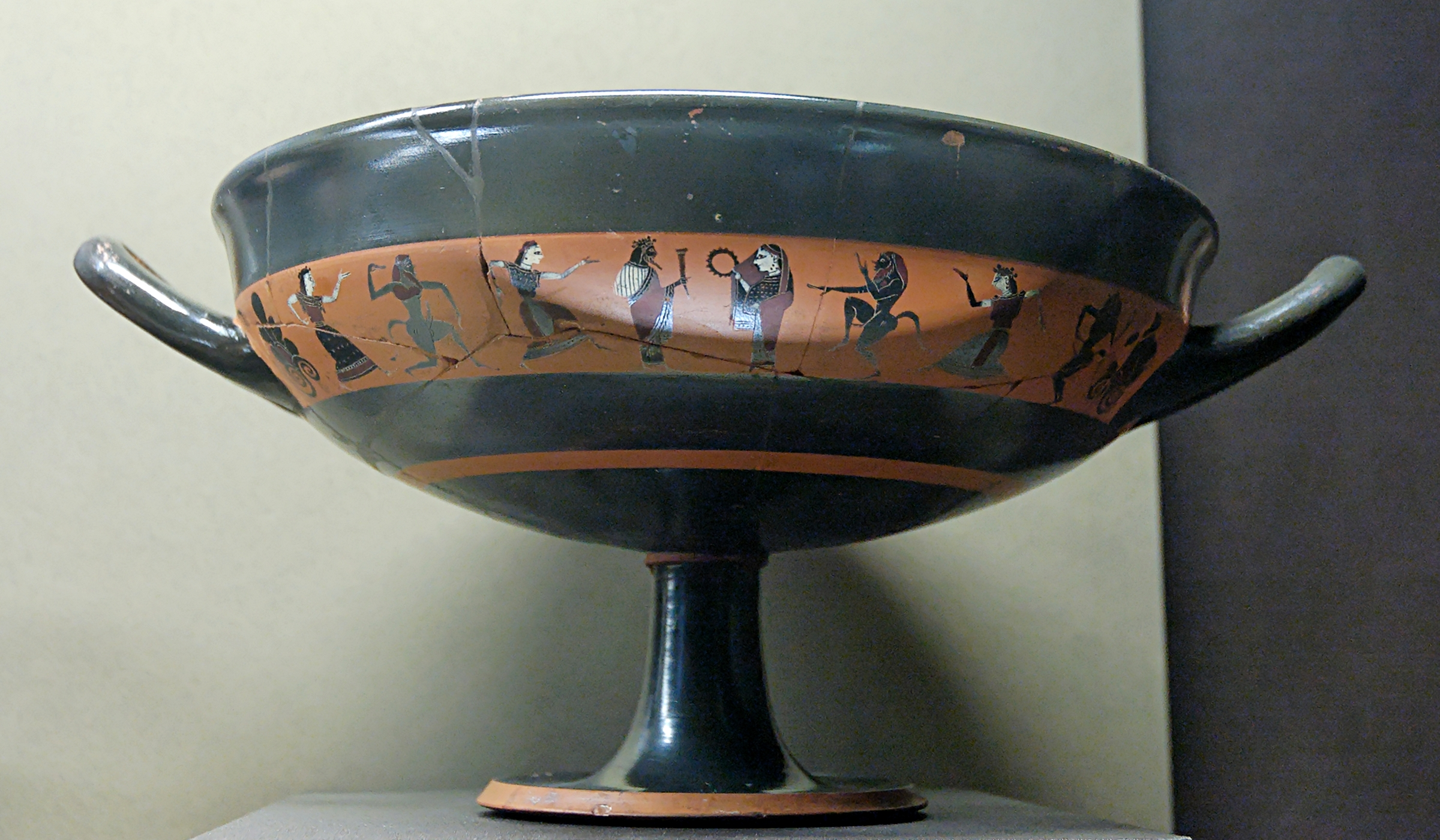
Band cup, with the main painting in a band low on the body. All these "cups" are covered by kylix

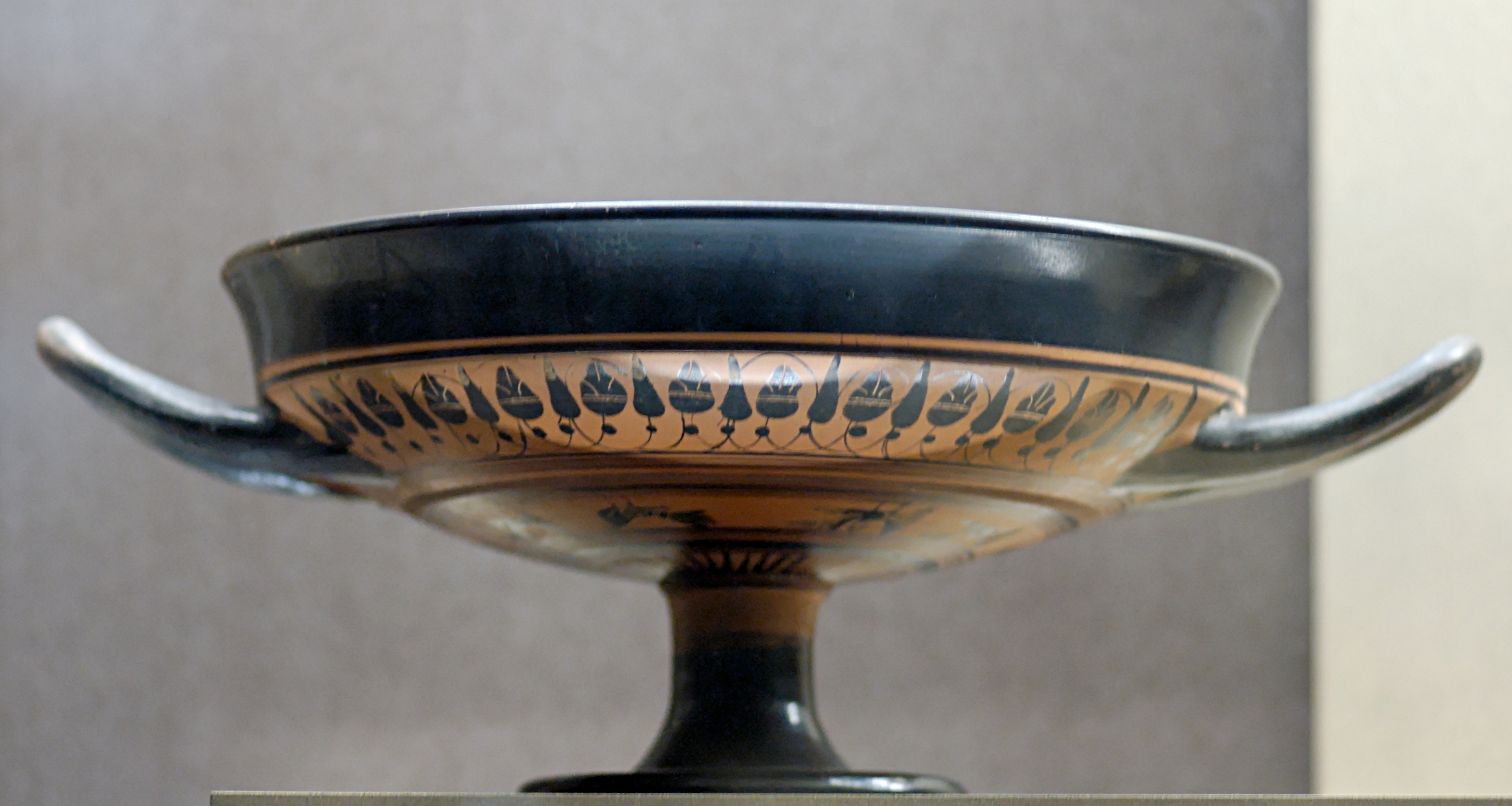
Droop cup

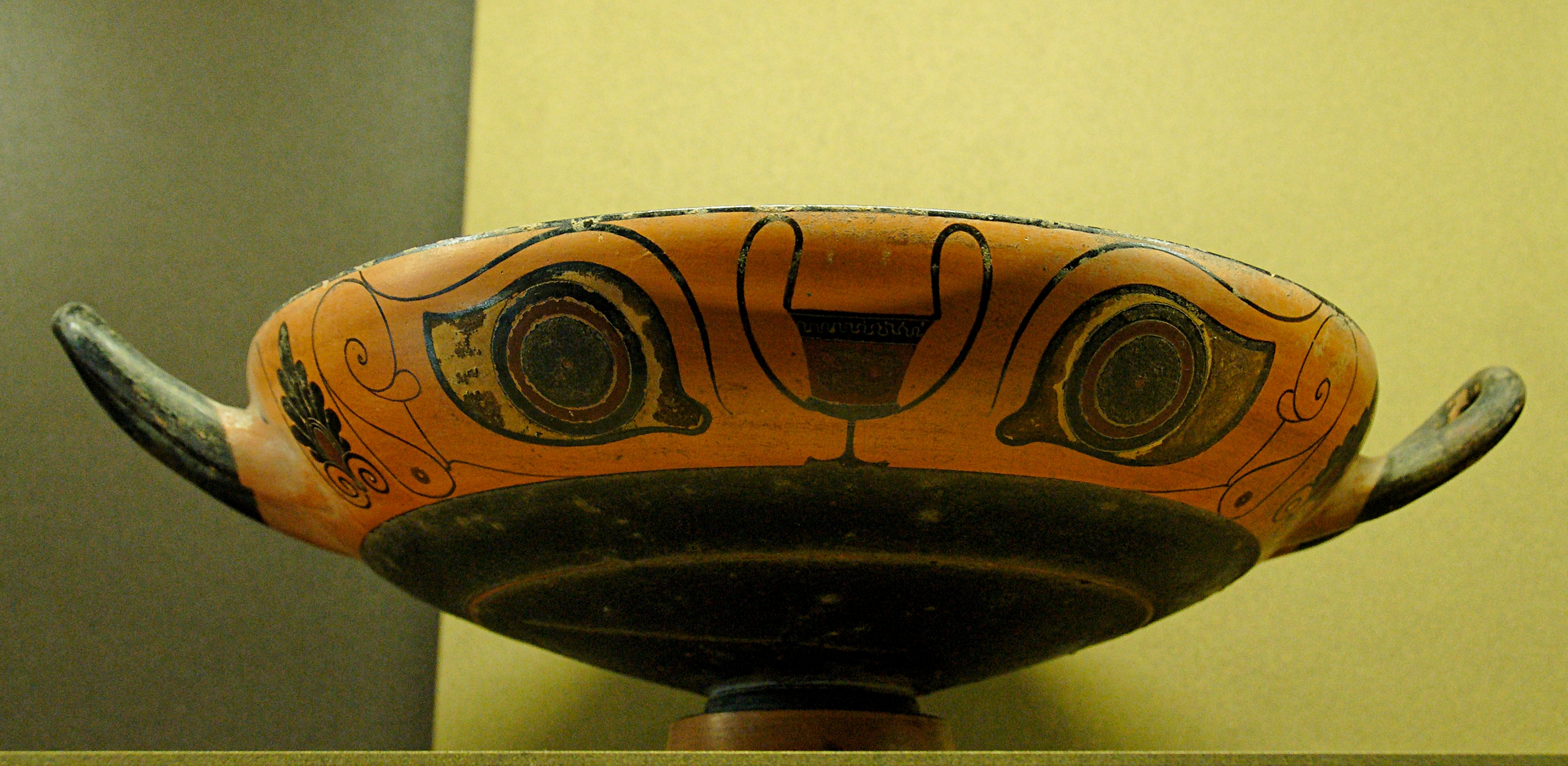
Eye-cup, painted with eyes

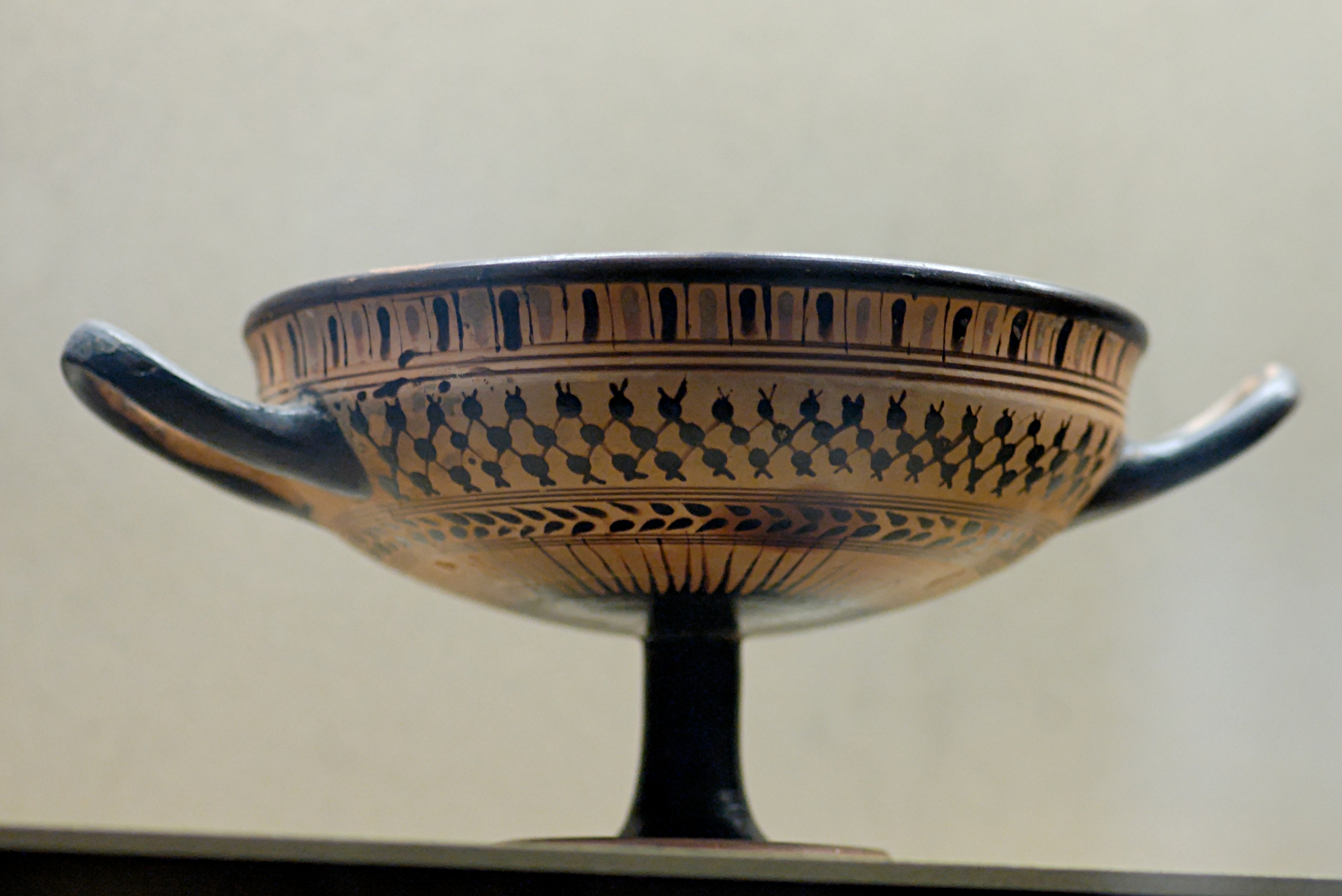
Kassel cup

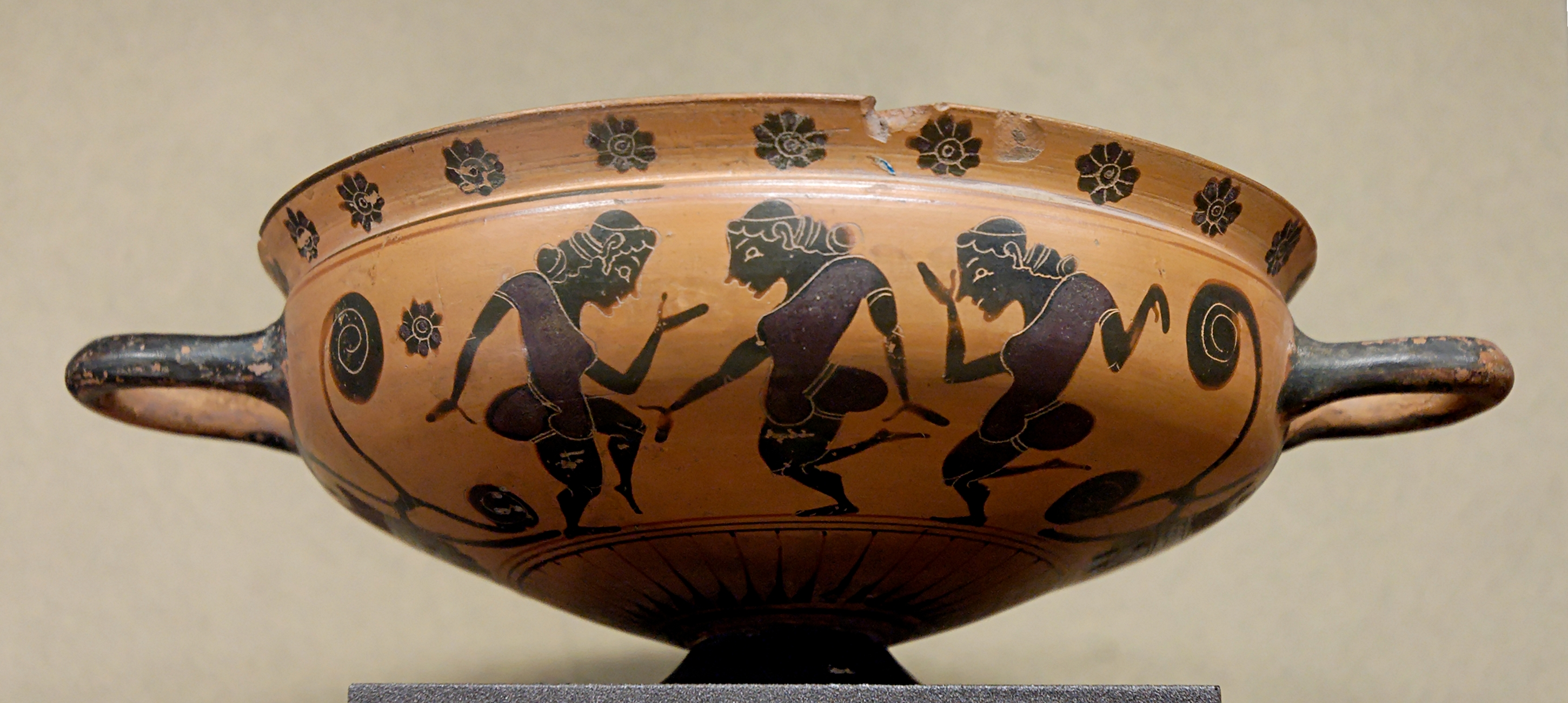
Komast cup, Athenian black-figure, with short stem, angled "offset" lip.

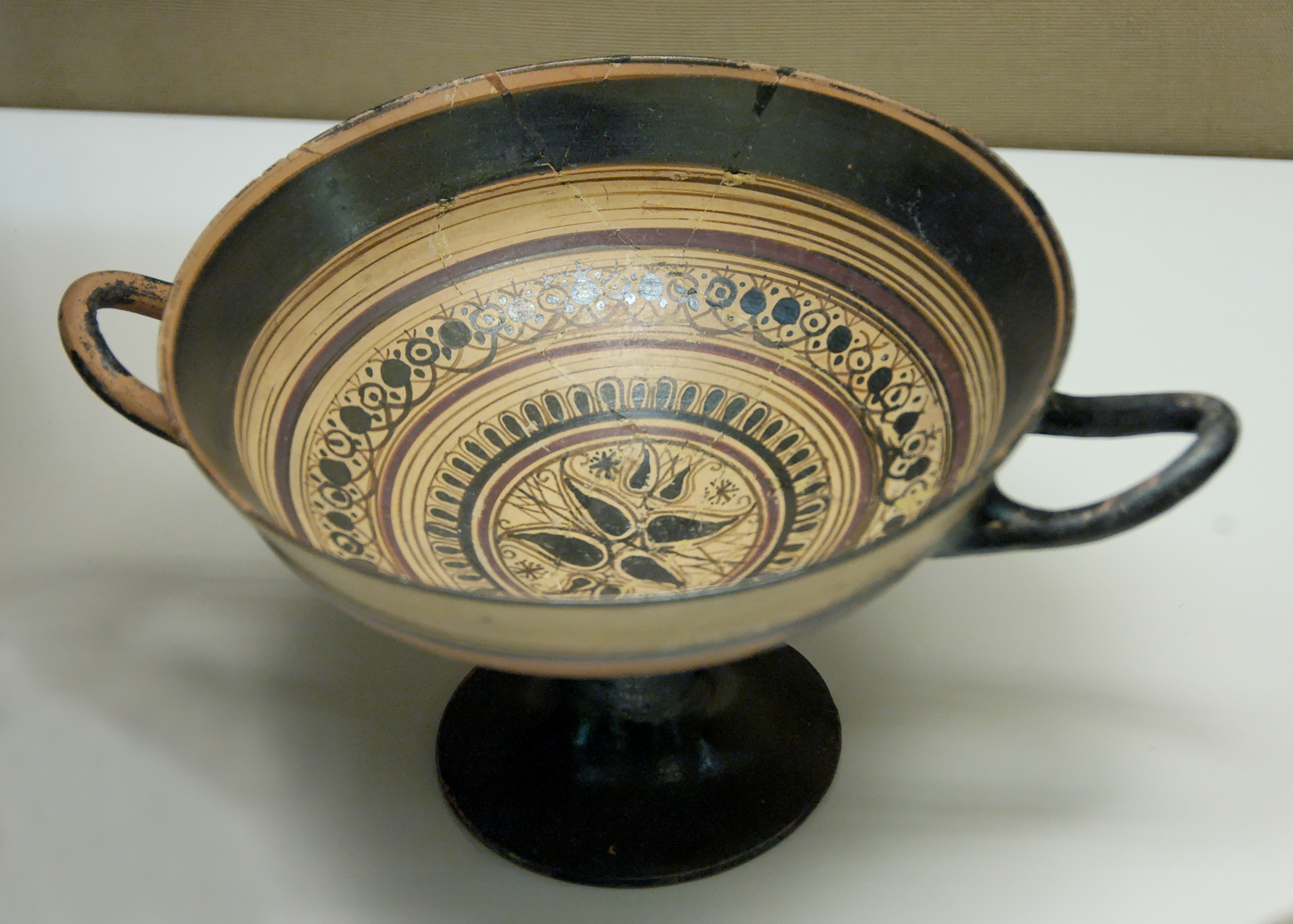
Lakonian cup

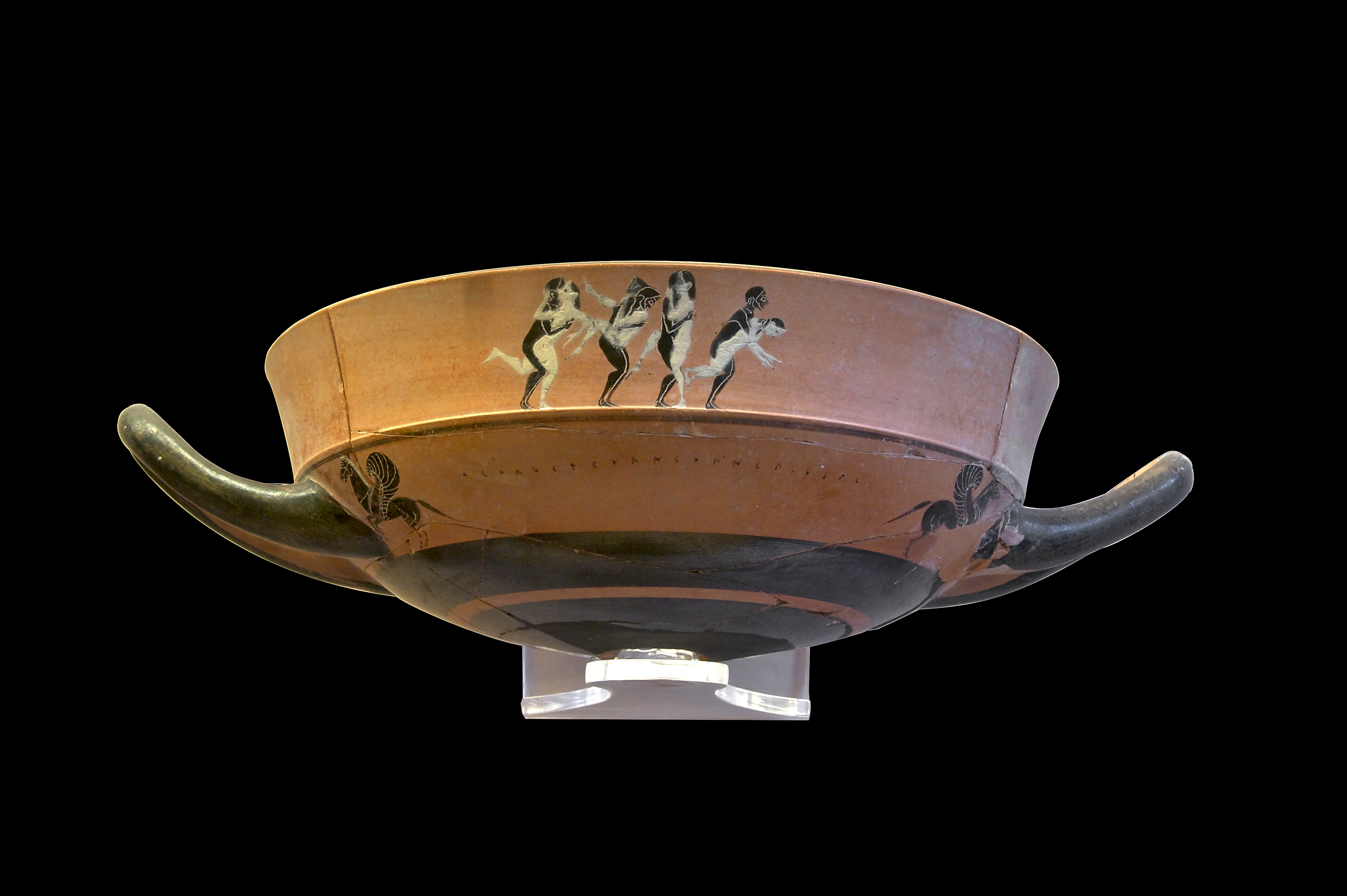
Lip cup, with the main painting just below the lip; the stem and footr are lost in this example

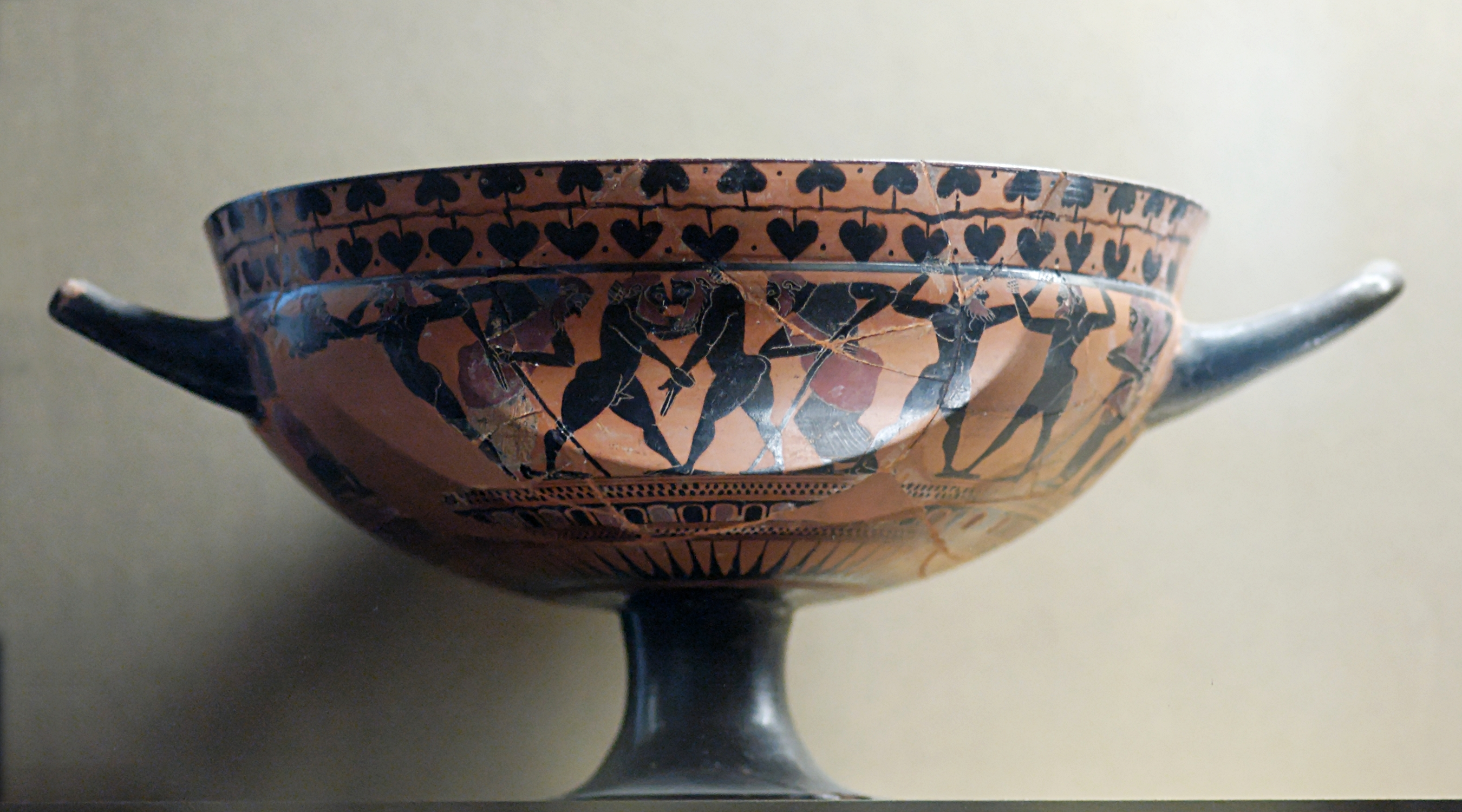
Siana cup, Similar to Komast, with slightly longer stem, and painted on the inside.

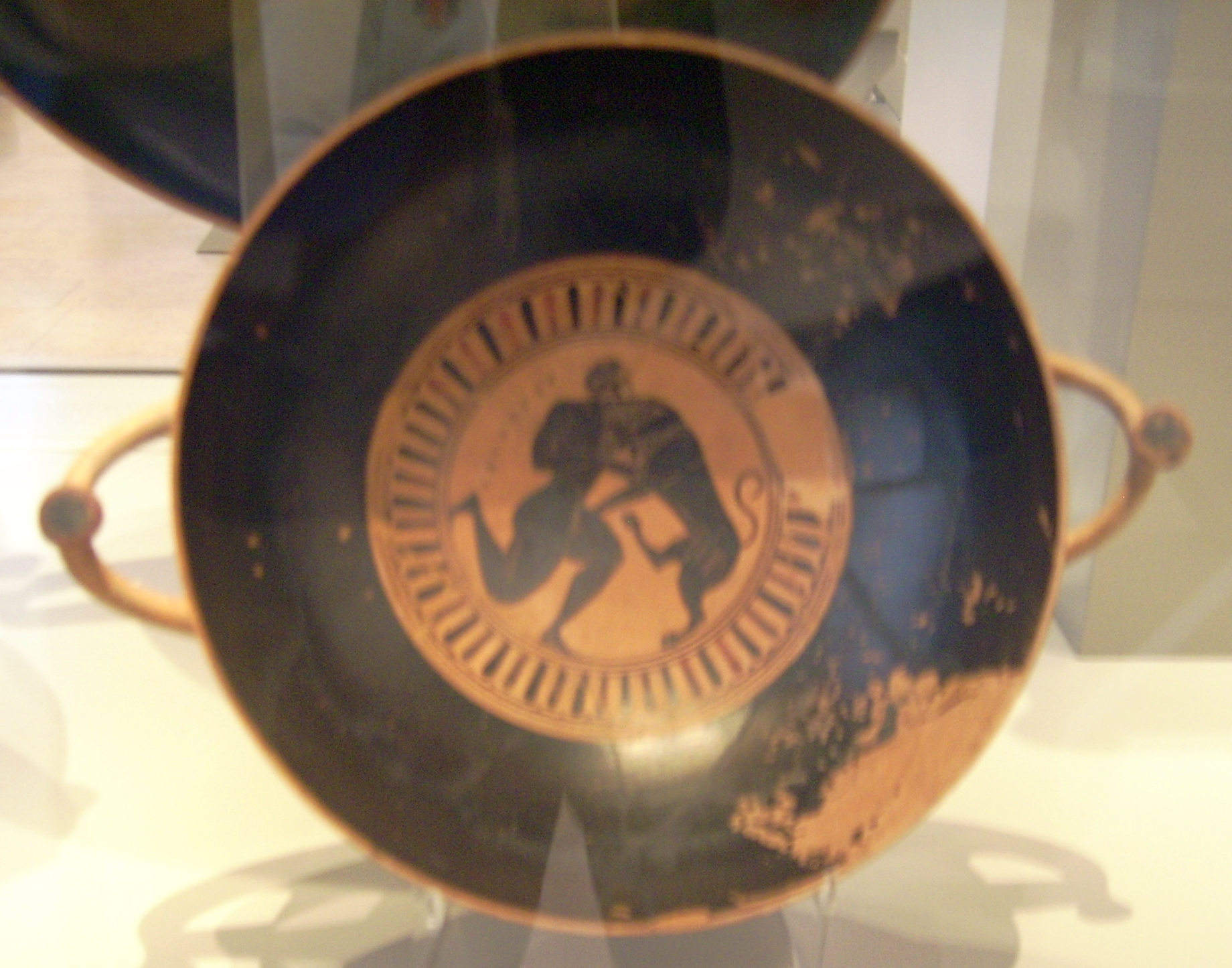
Merrythought cup, with distinctive "wishbone" handles

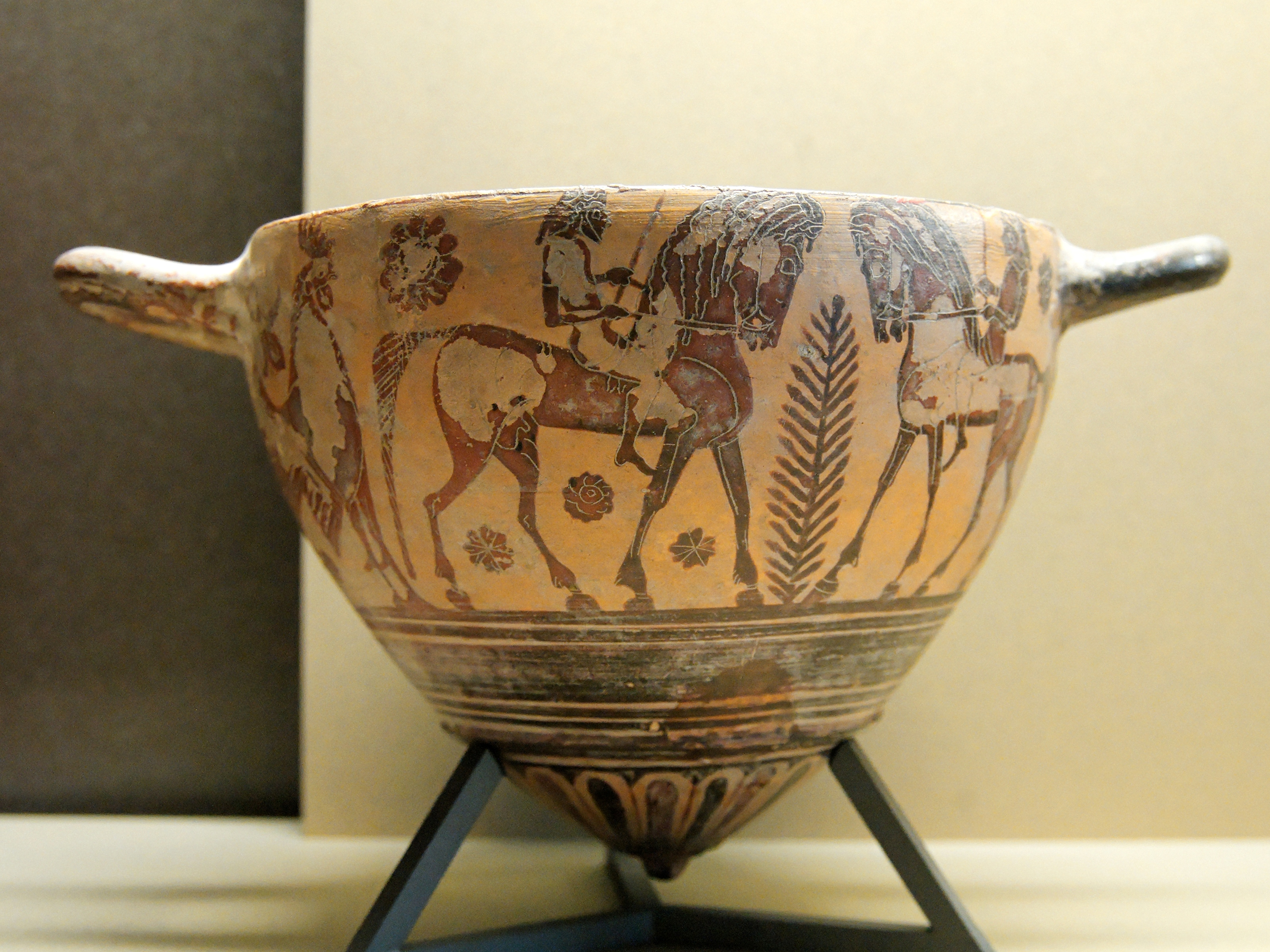
Mastos, breast-shaped cup with pointed nipple base; handles optional

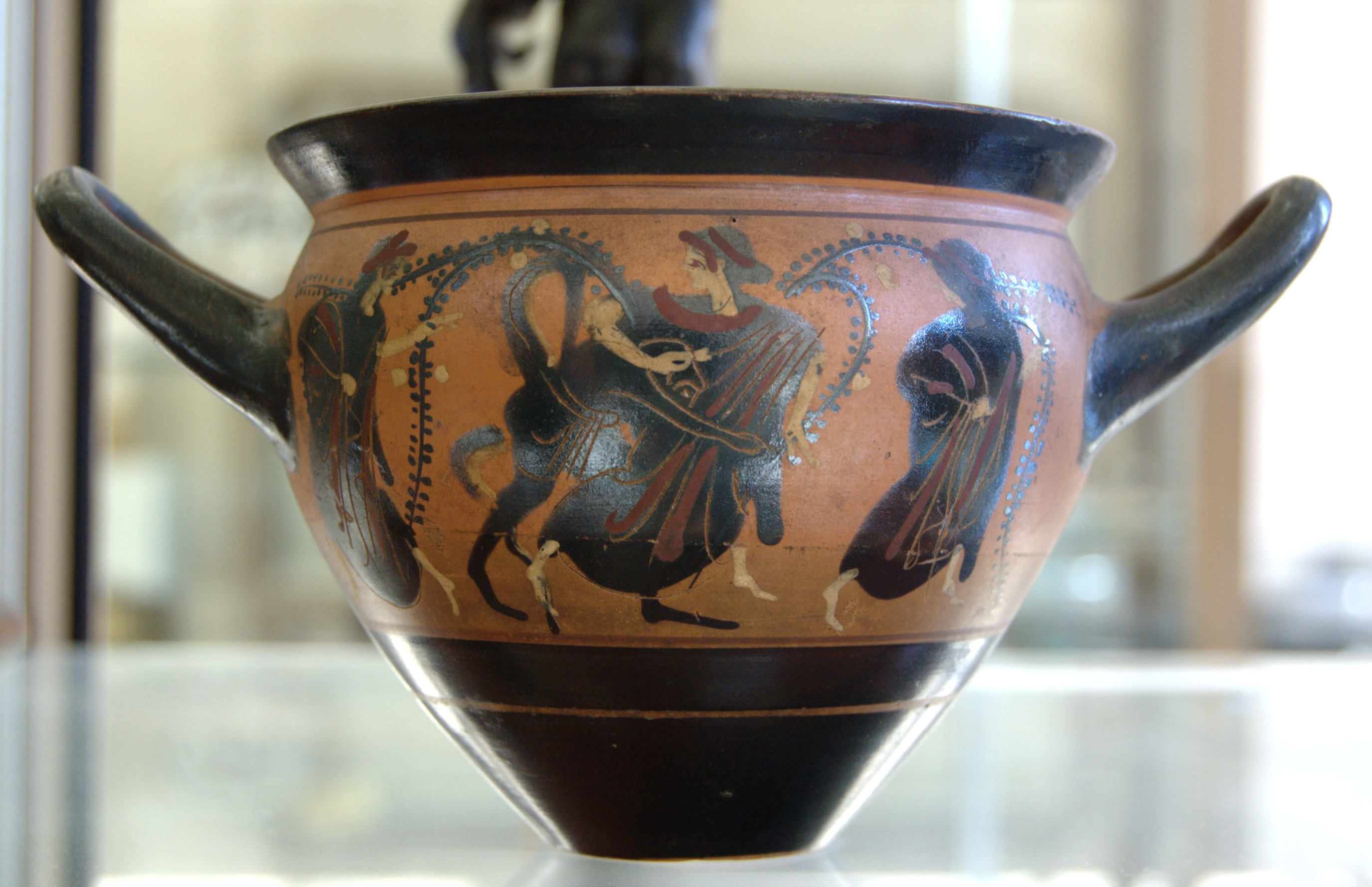
Mastoid cup, like a mastos but with flat base and often handles

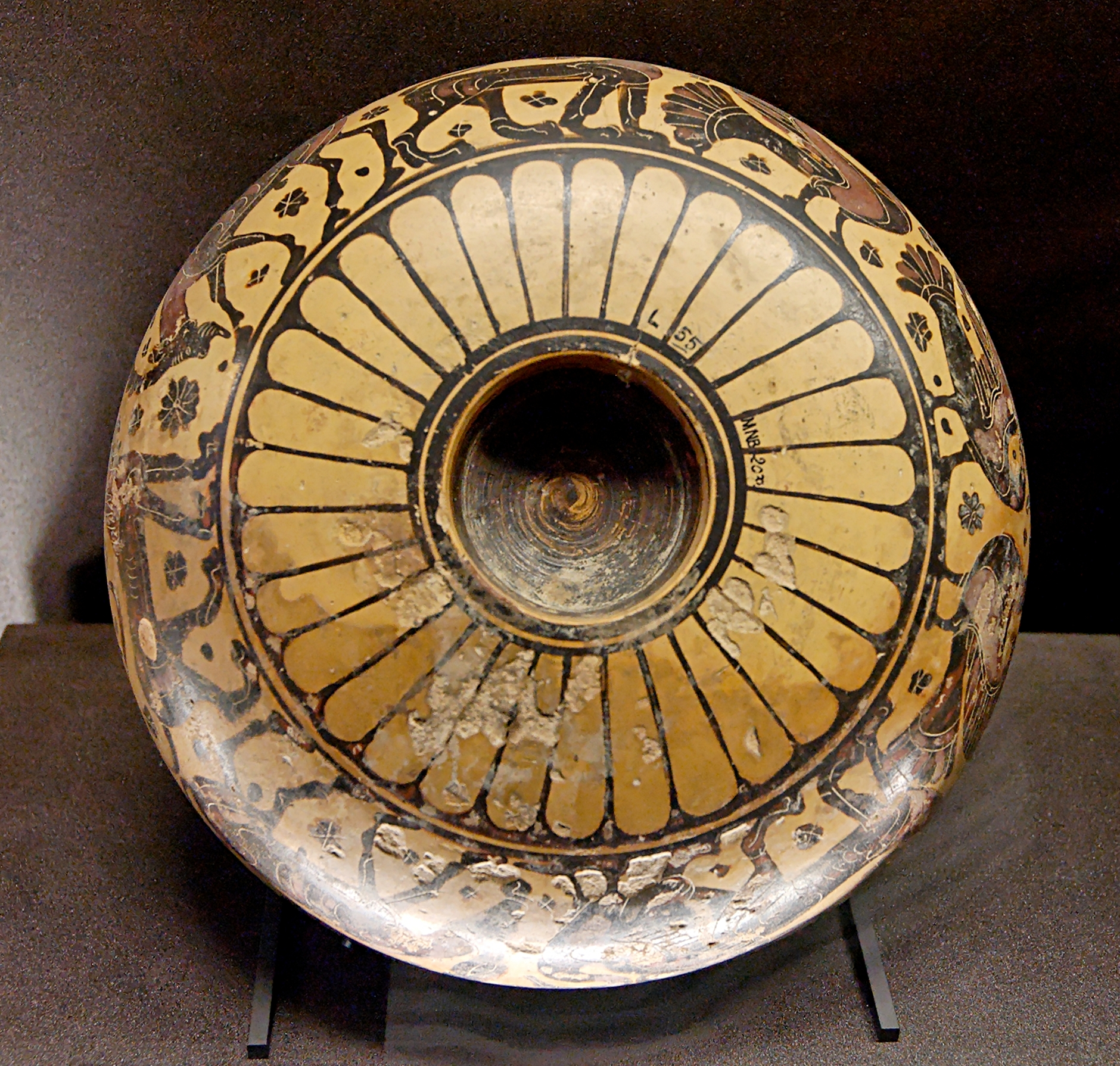
Phiale

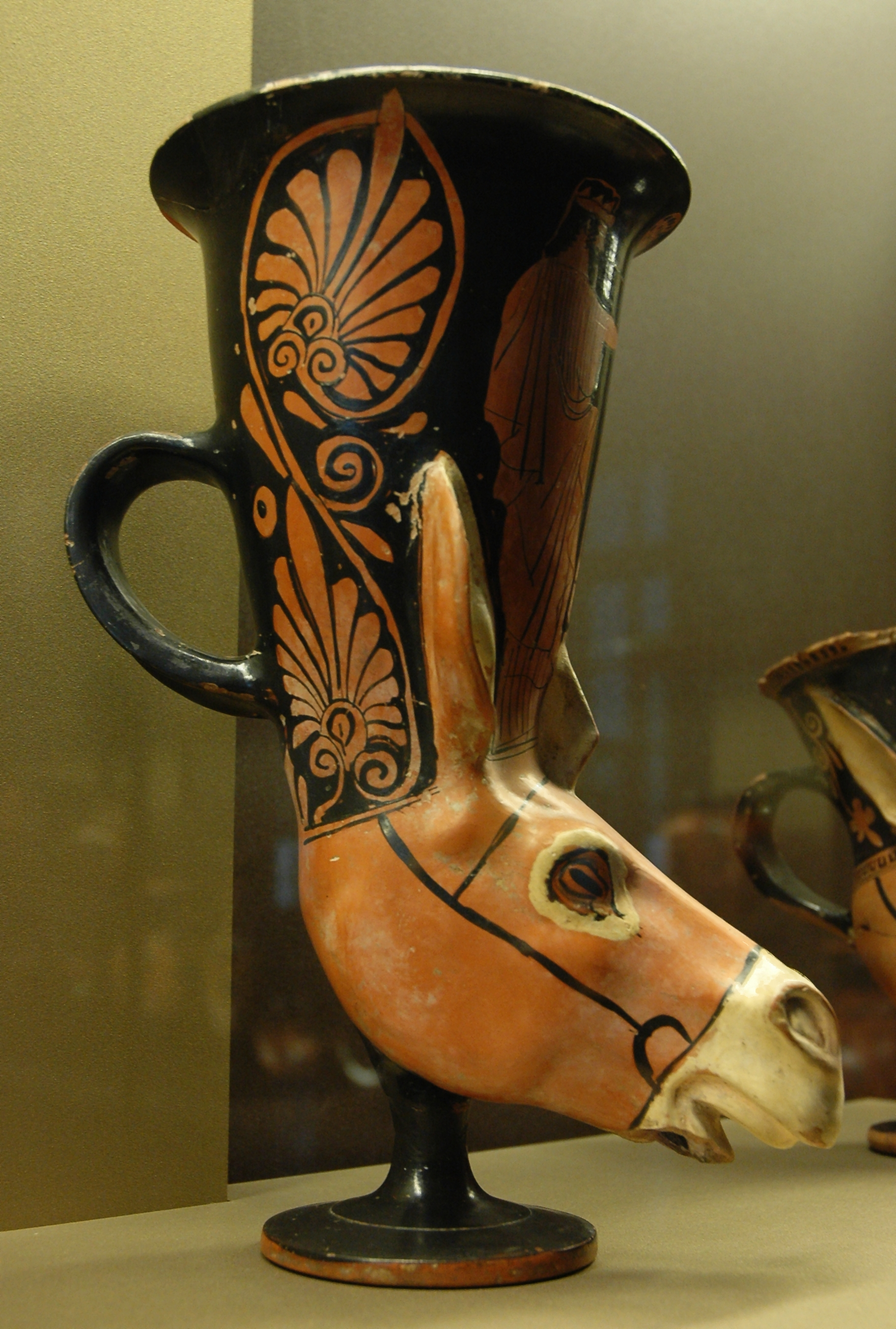
Rhyton, c. 430 BCE.

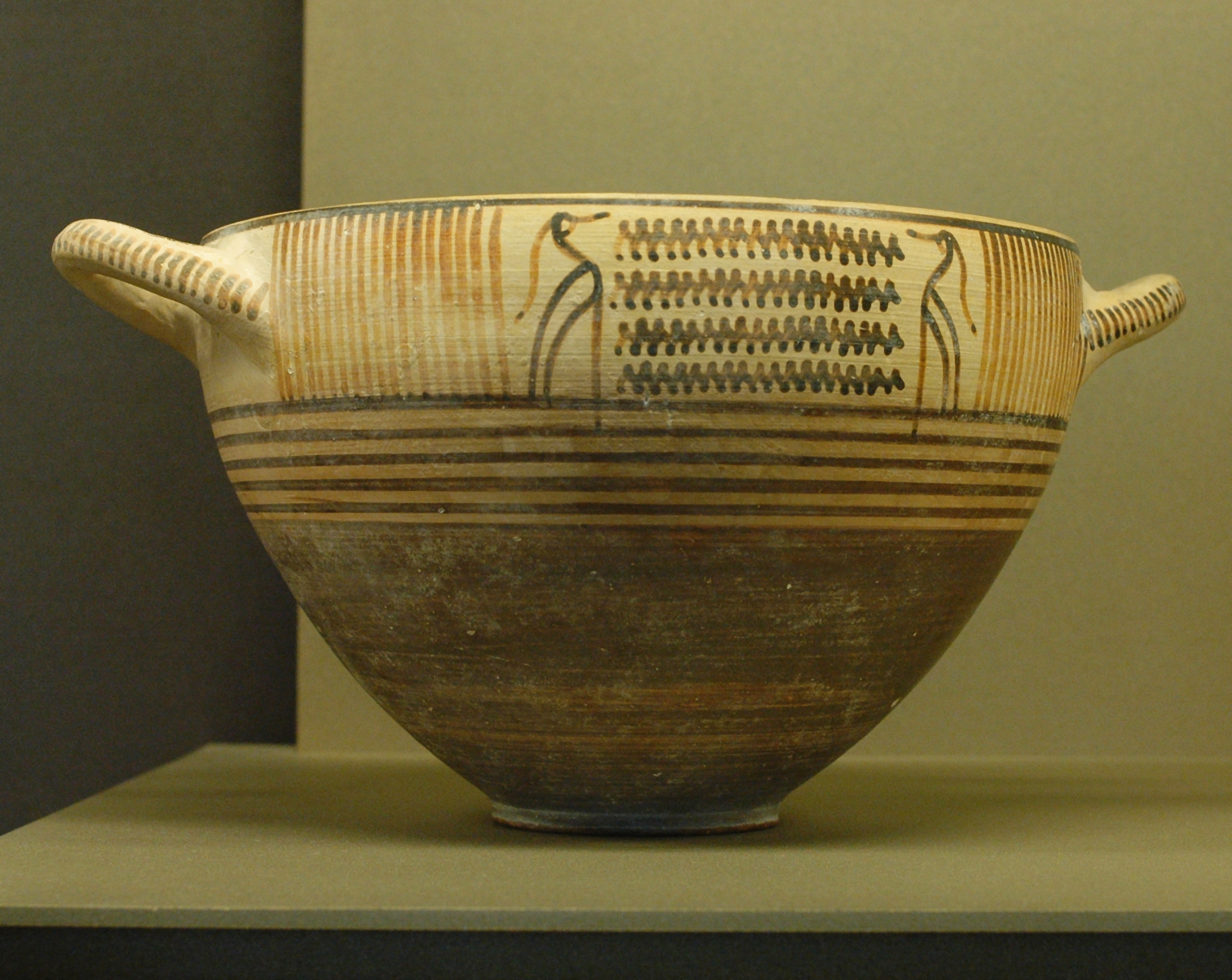
Skyphos, c. 740 BC

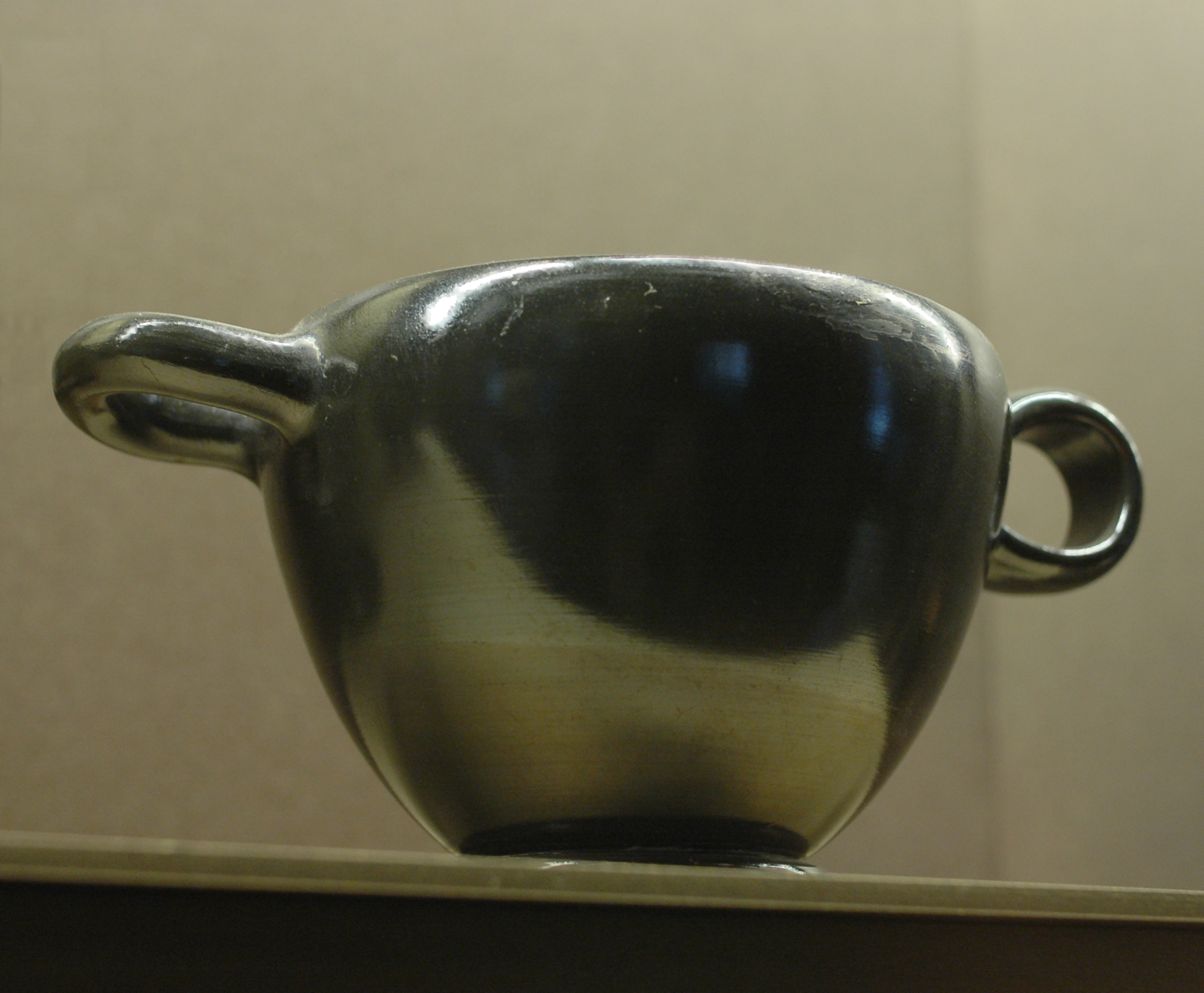
Glaux skyphos

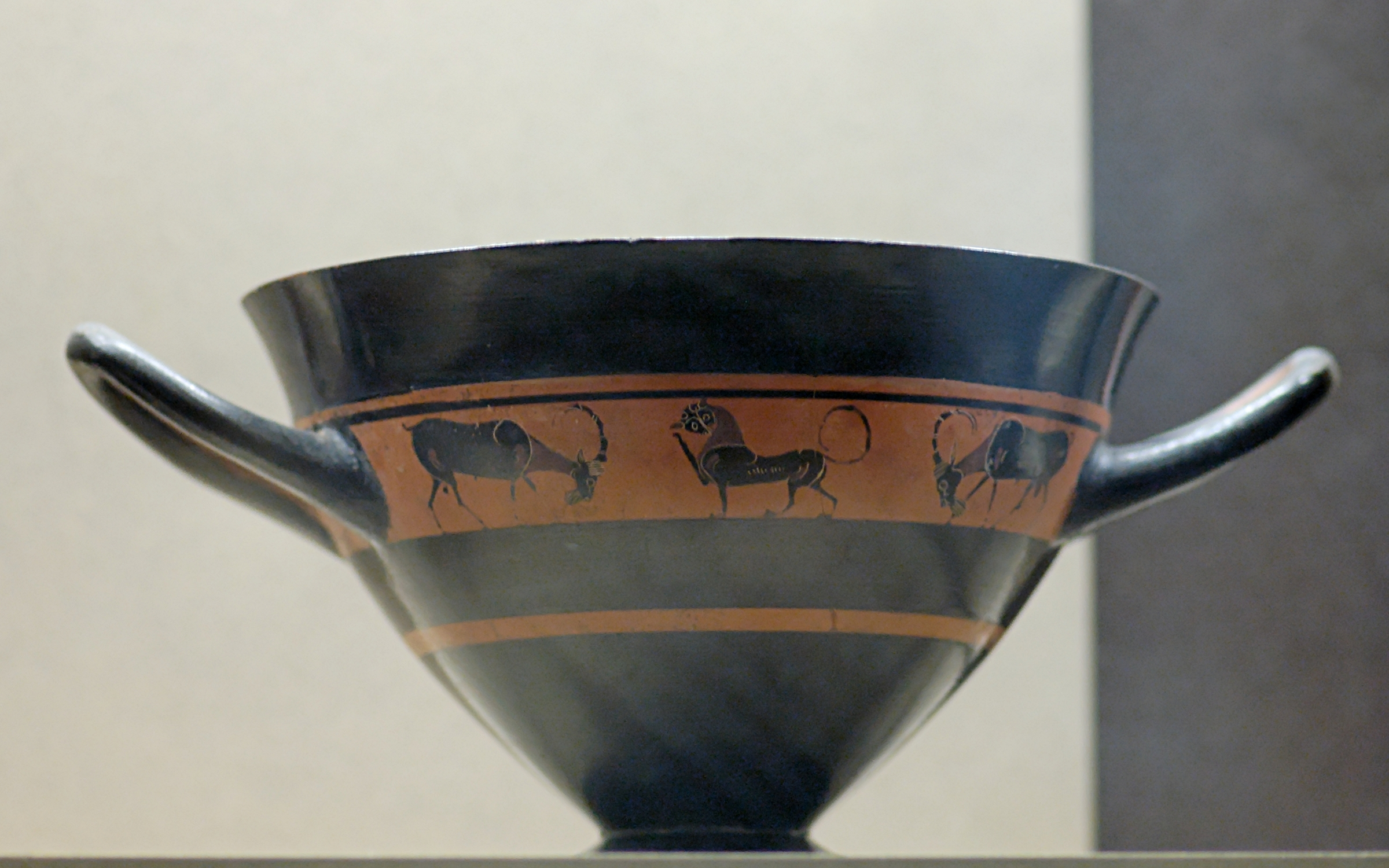
Hermogenes skyphos
Jugs

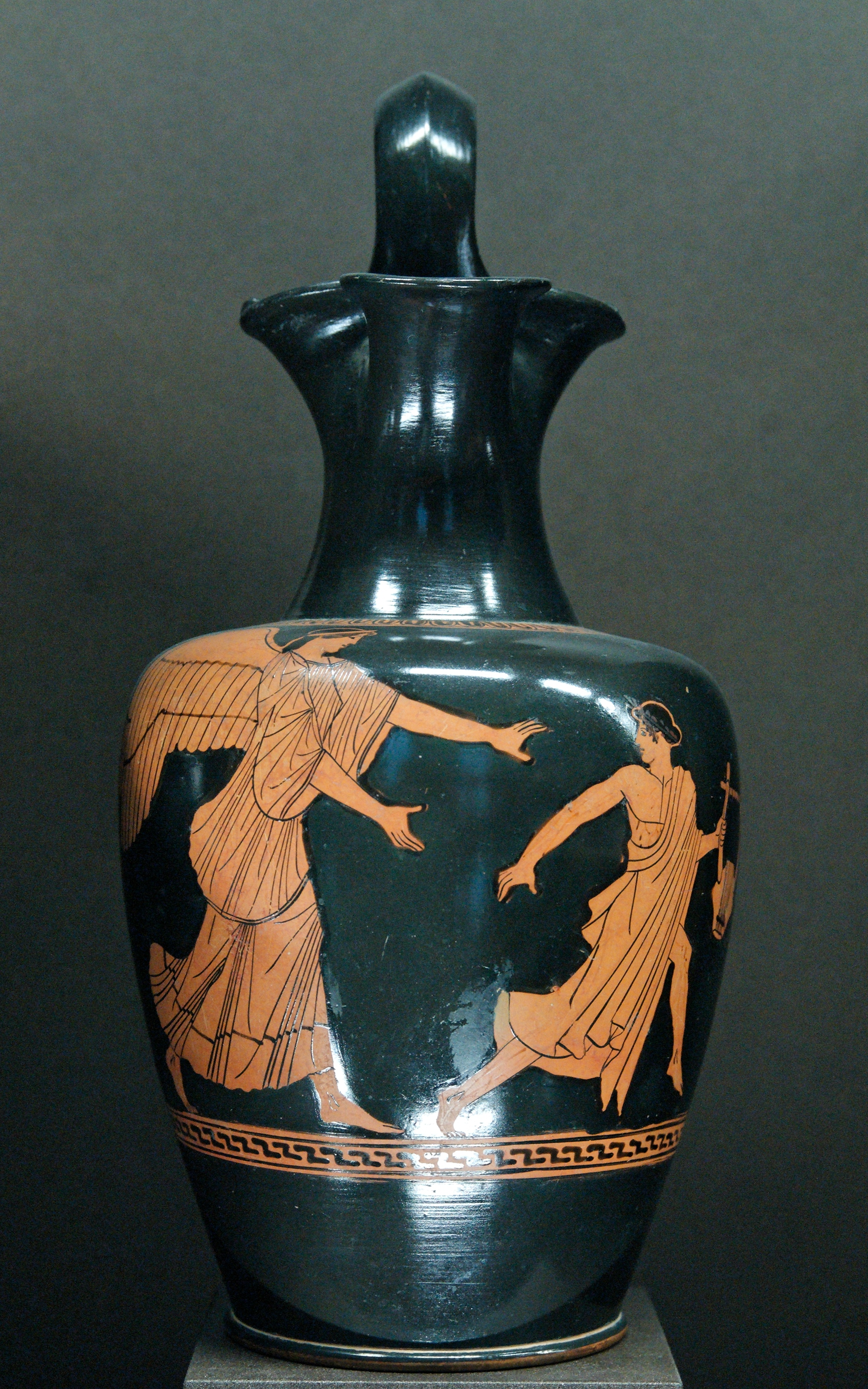
Oenochoe Shape 1

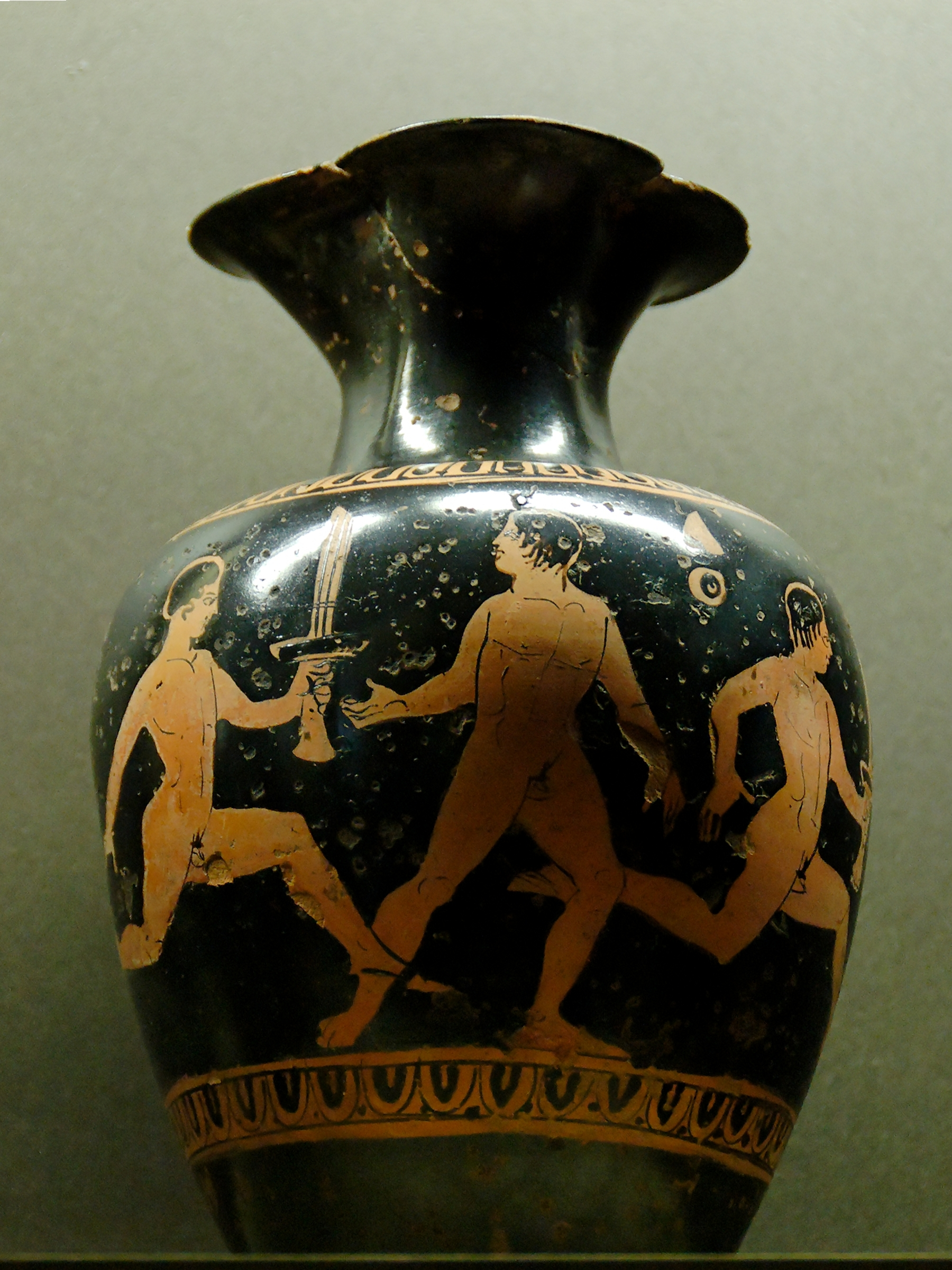
Oinochoe Shape 2

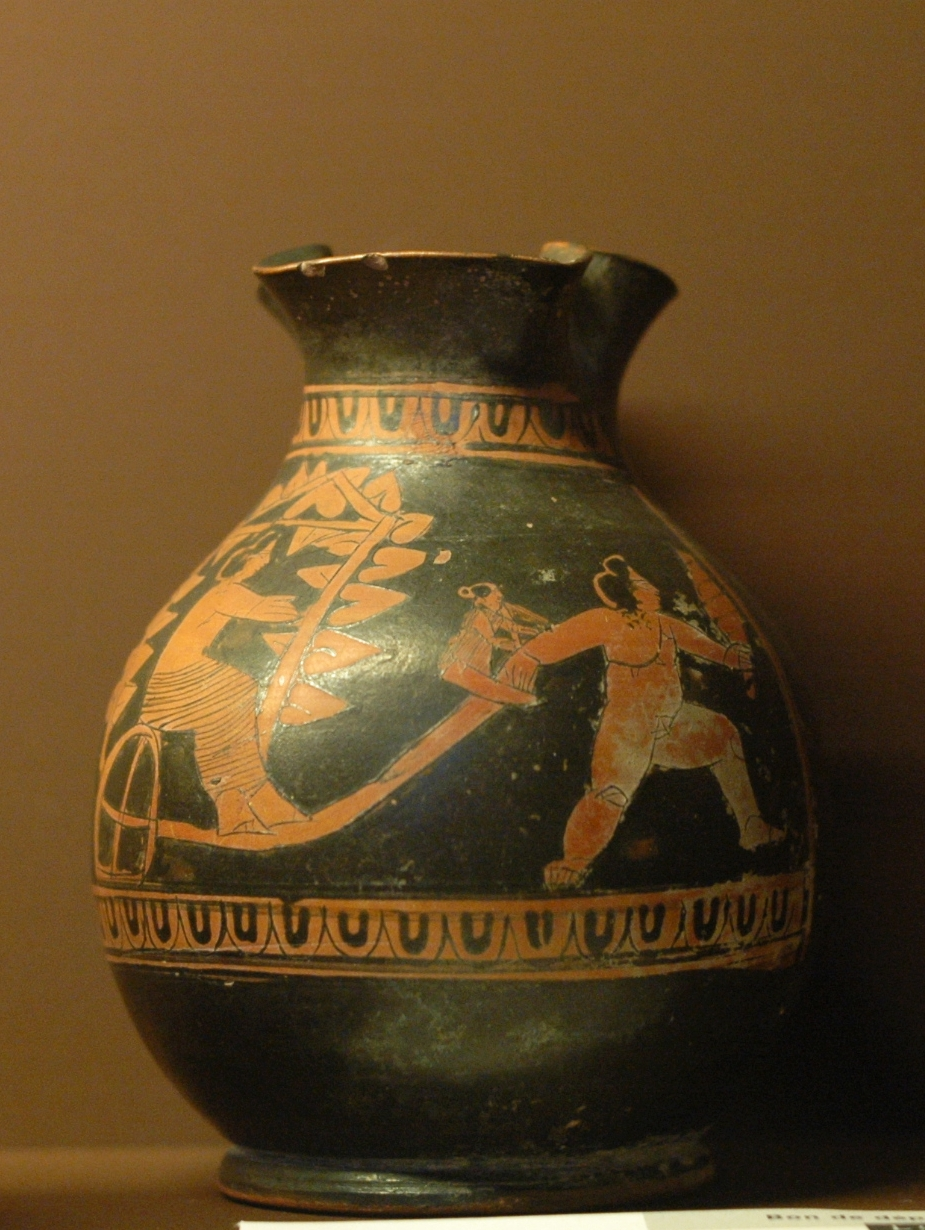
Oinochoe Shape 3

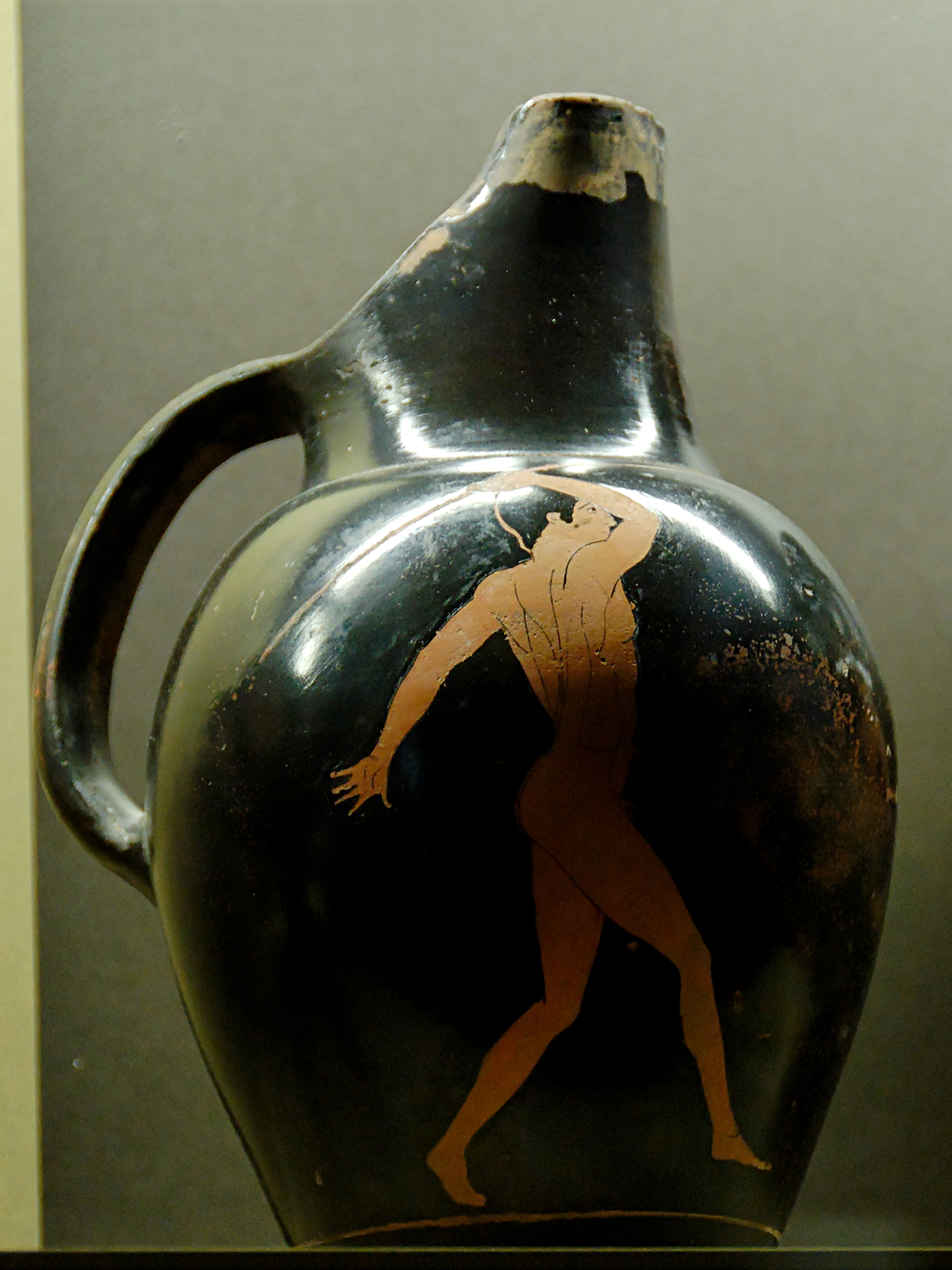
Oinochoe Shape 7

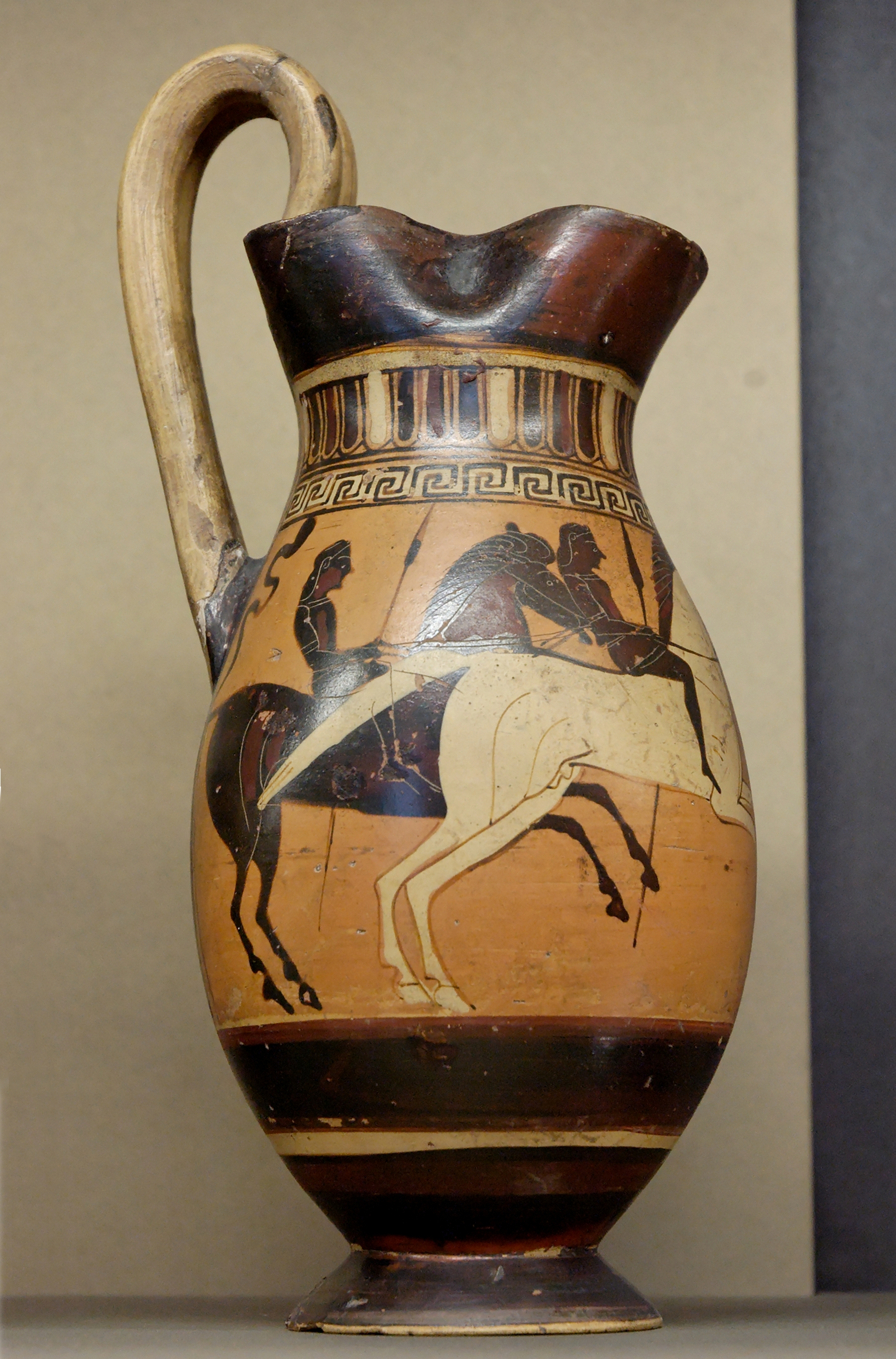
Olpe
Small oil and perfume

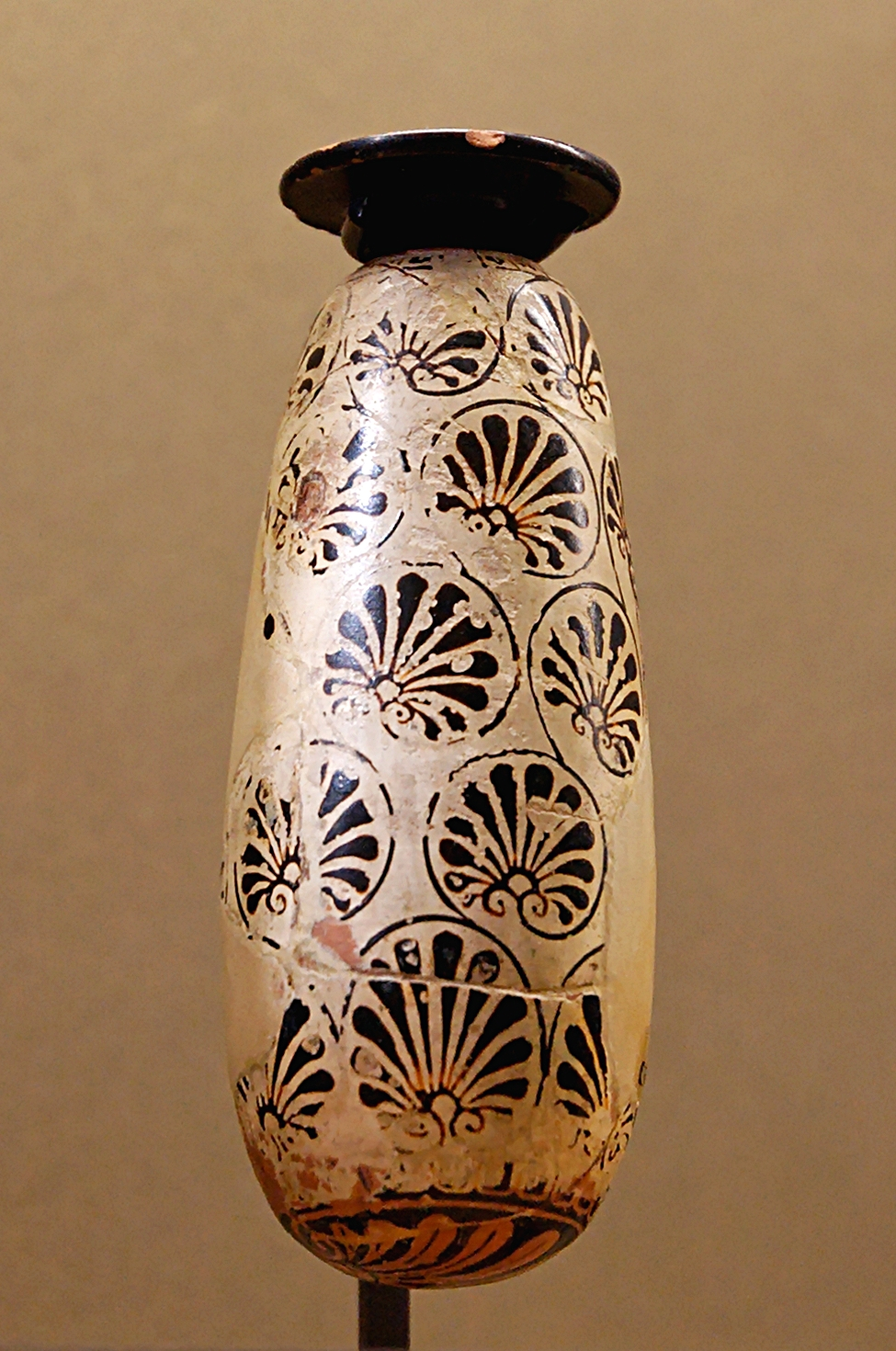
Alabastron, small holders for oil or perfume

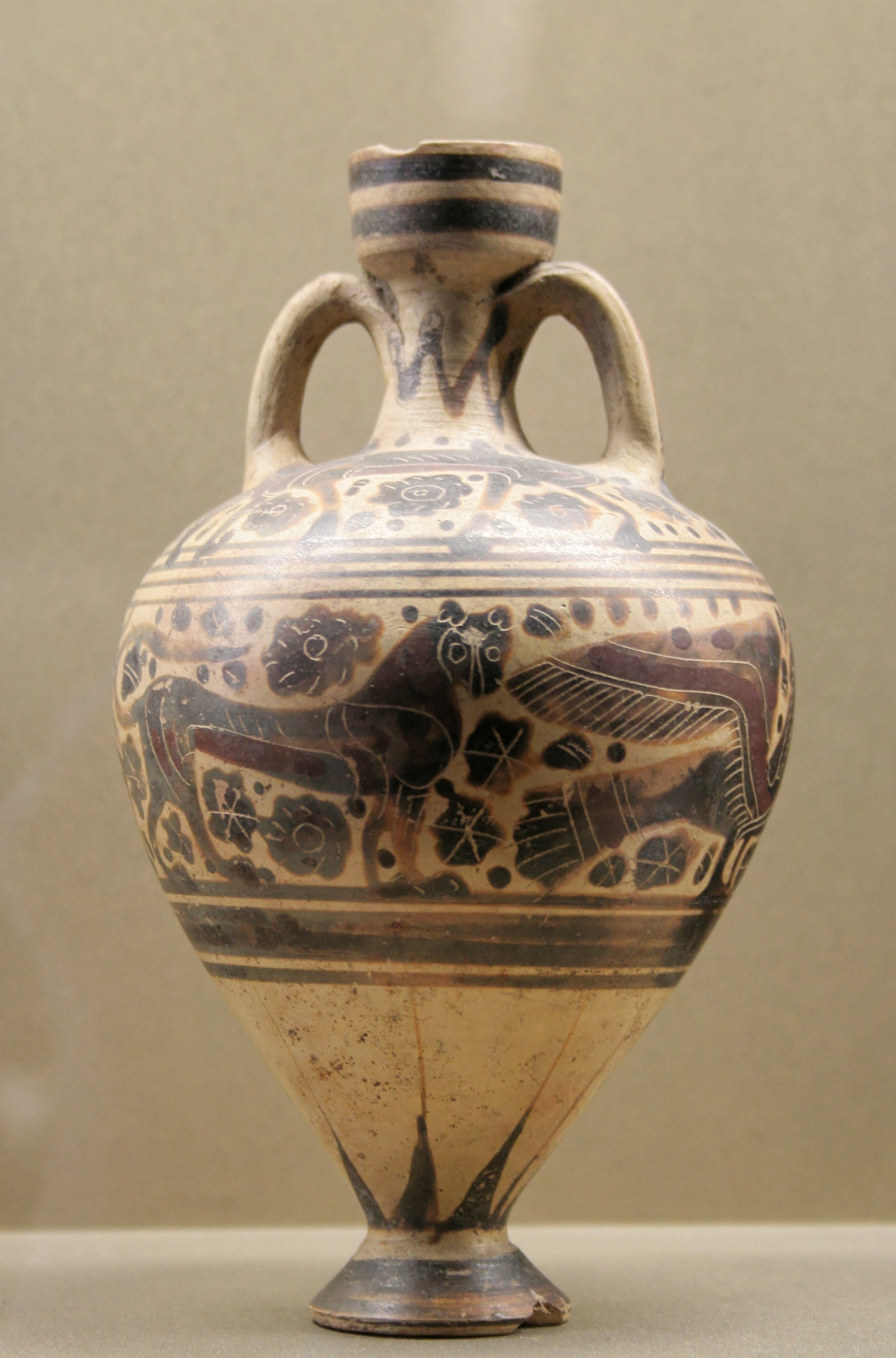
Amphoriskos

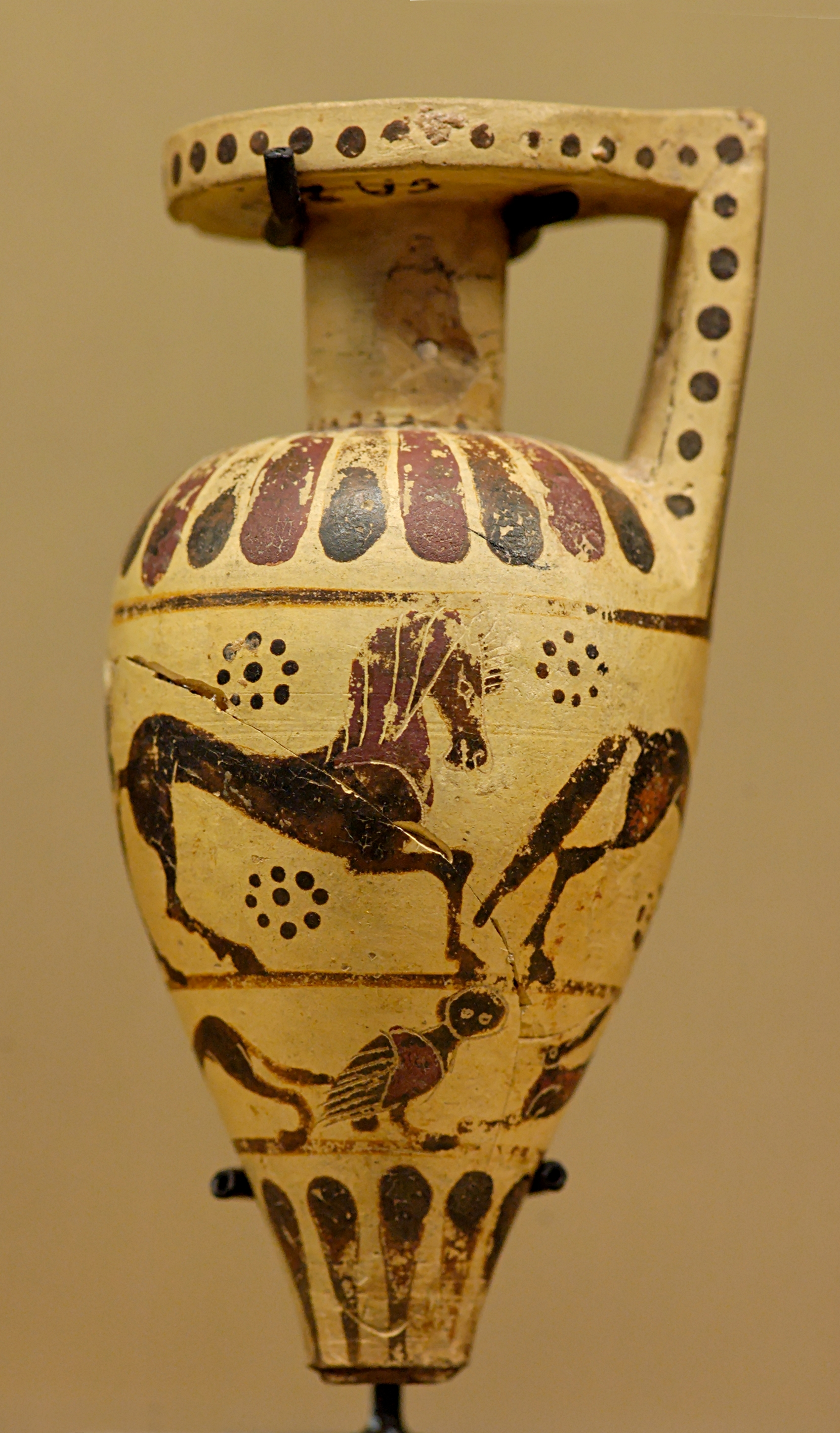
Pyriform Aryballos

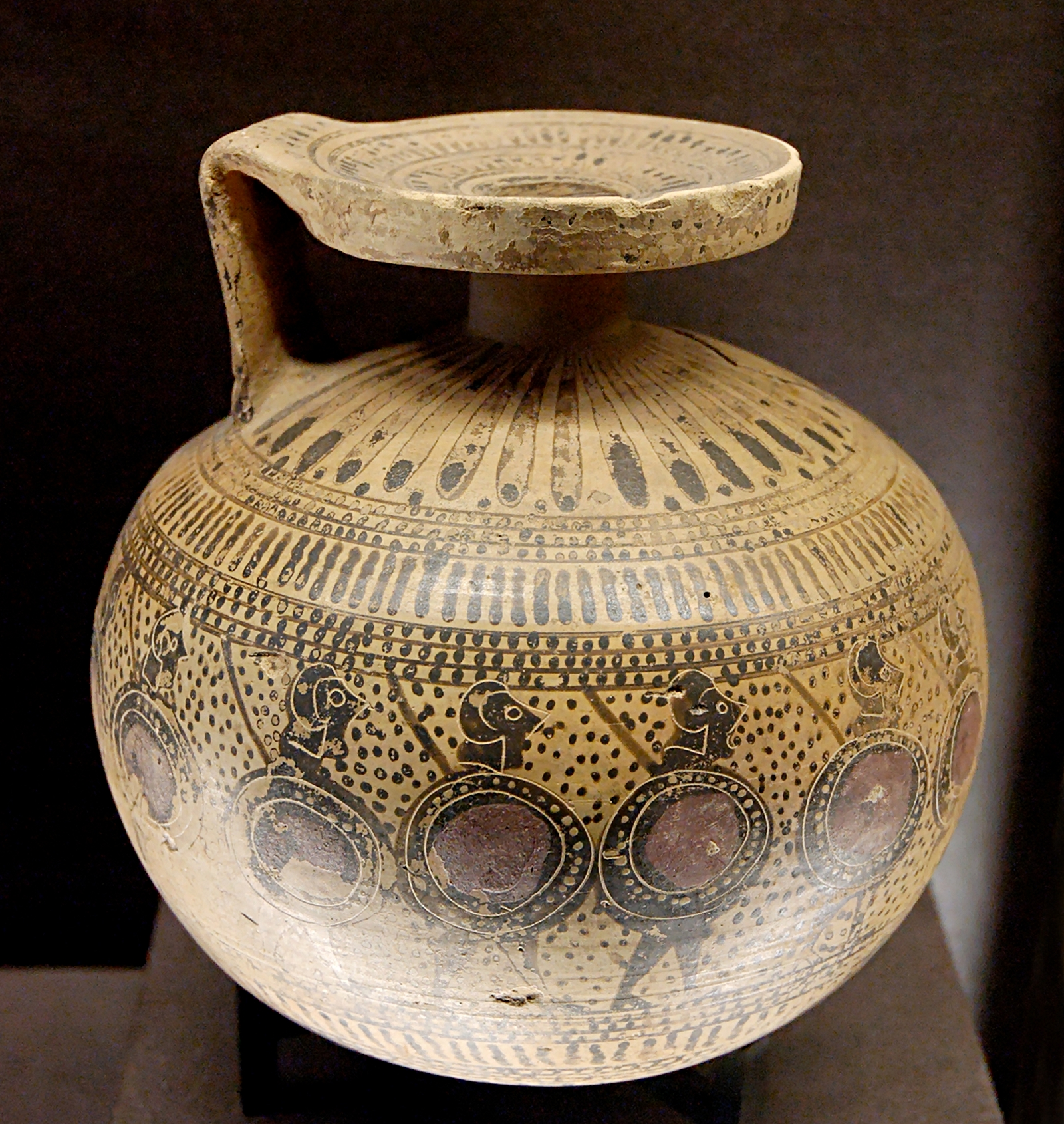
Globular aryballos

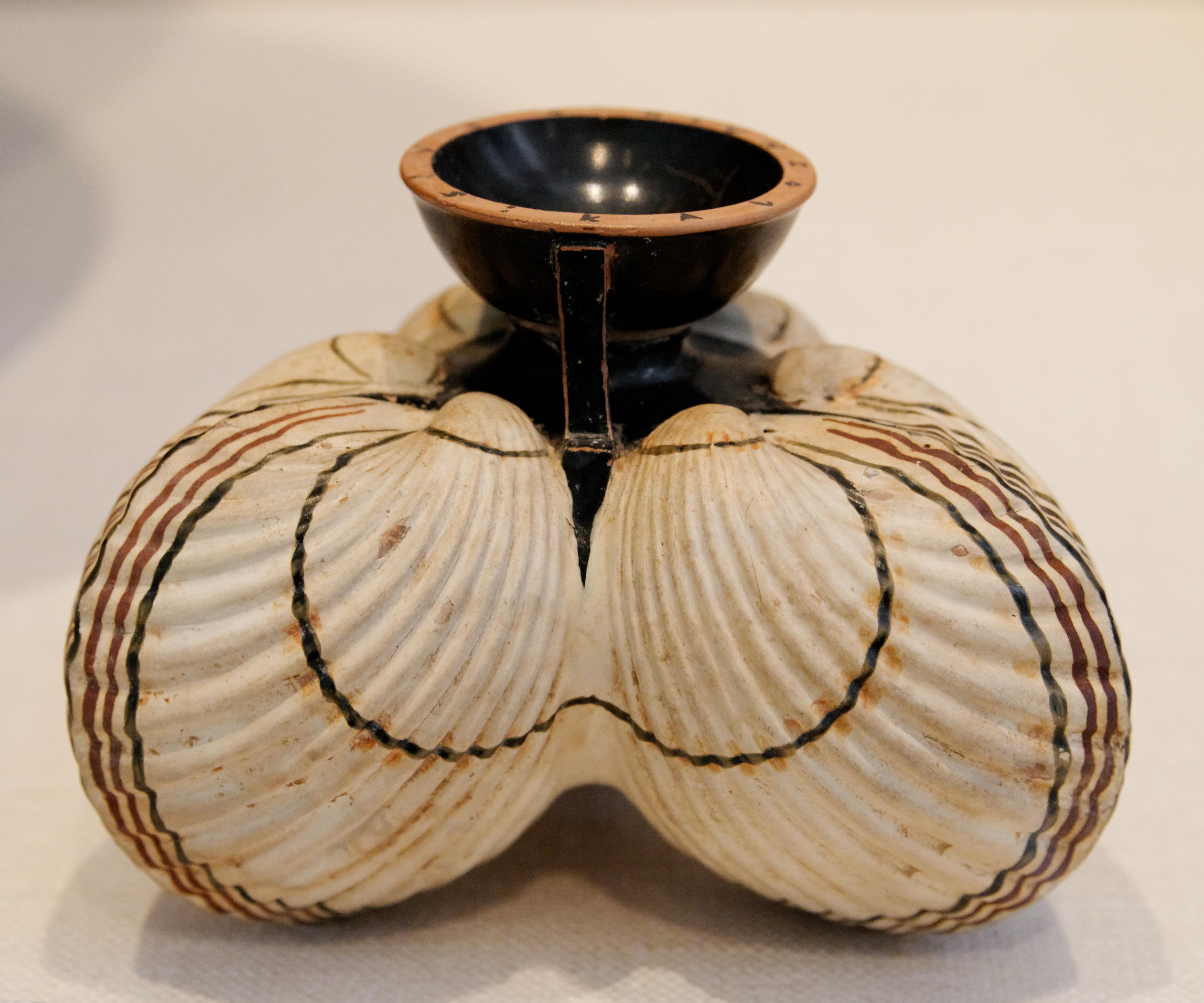
Fancy aryballos in the form of three cockle shells, 6th century BC

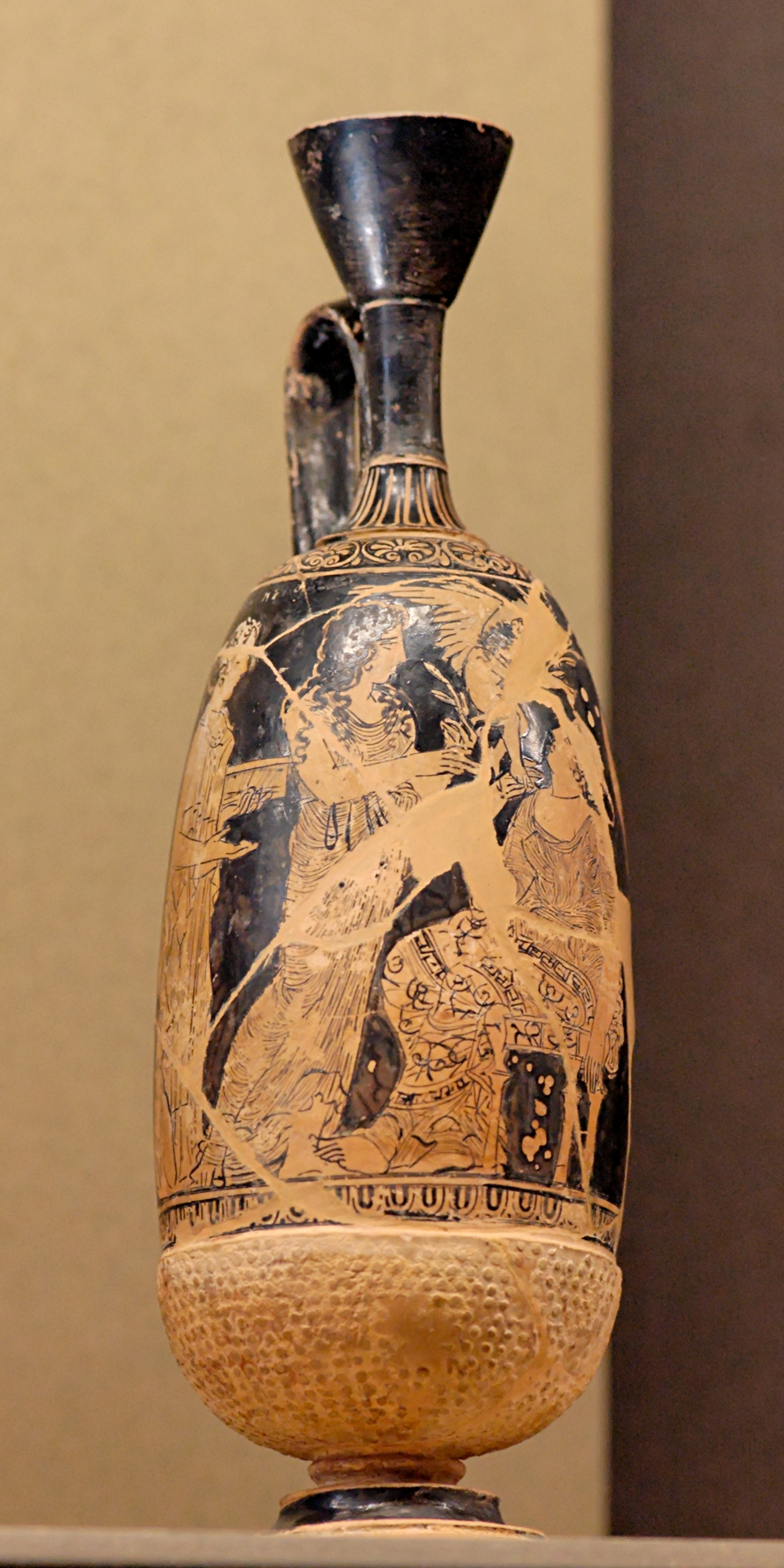
Acorn lekythos

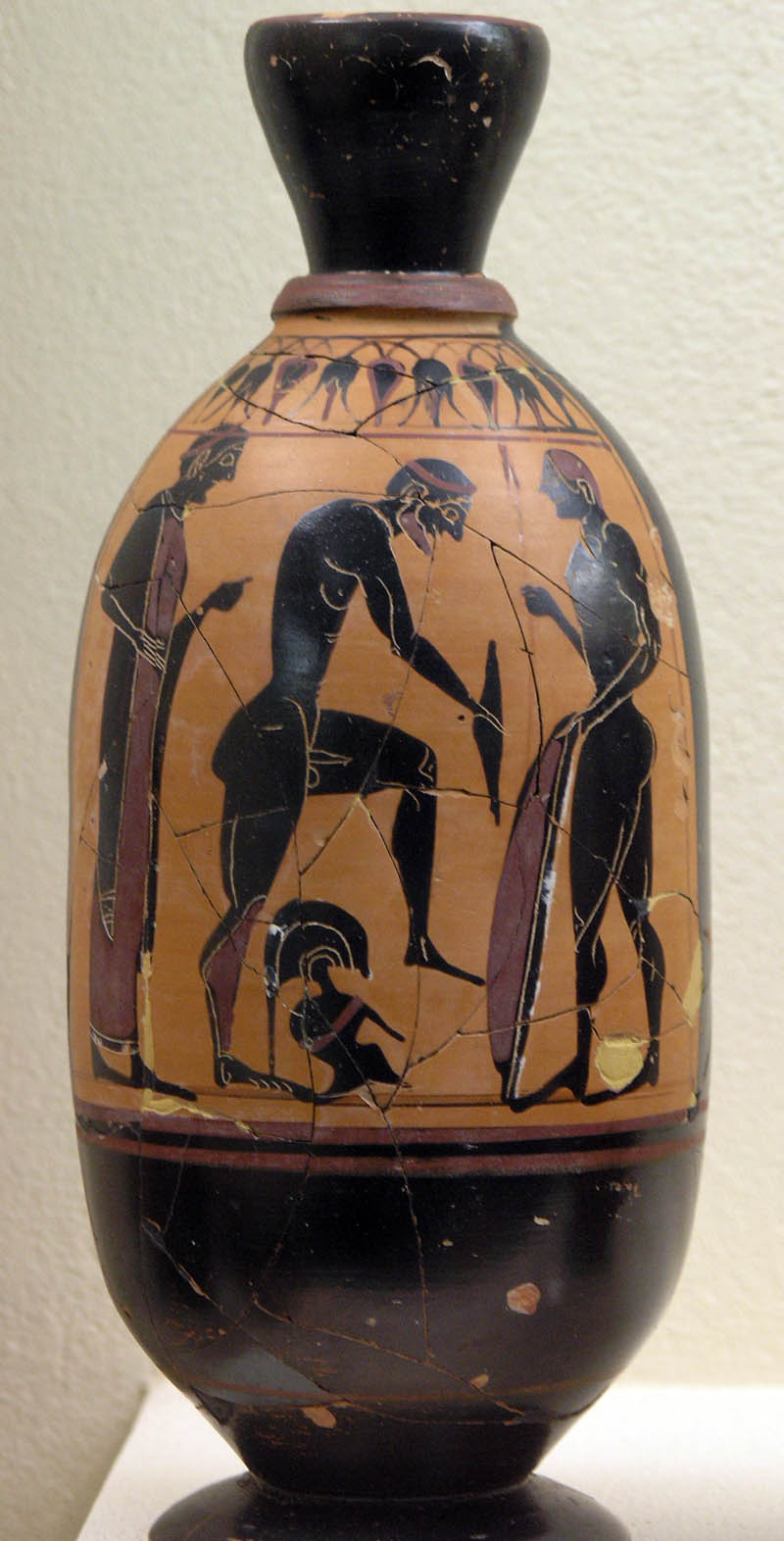
Deianeira lekythos, c. 550 BC.

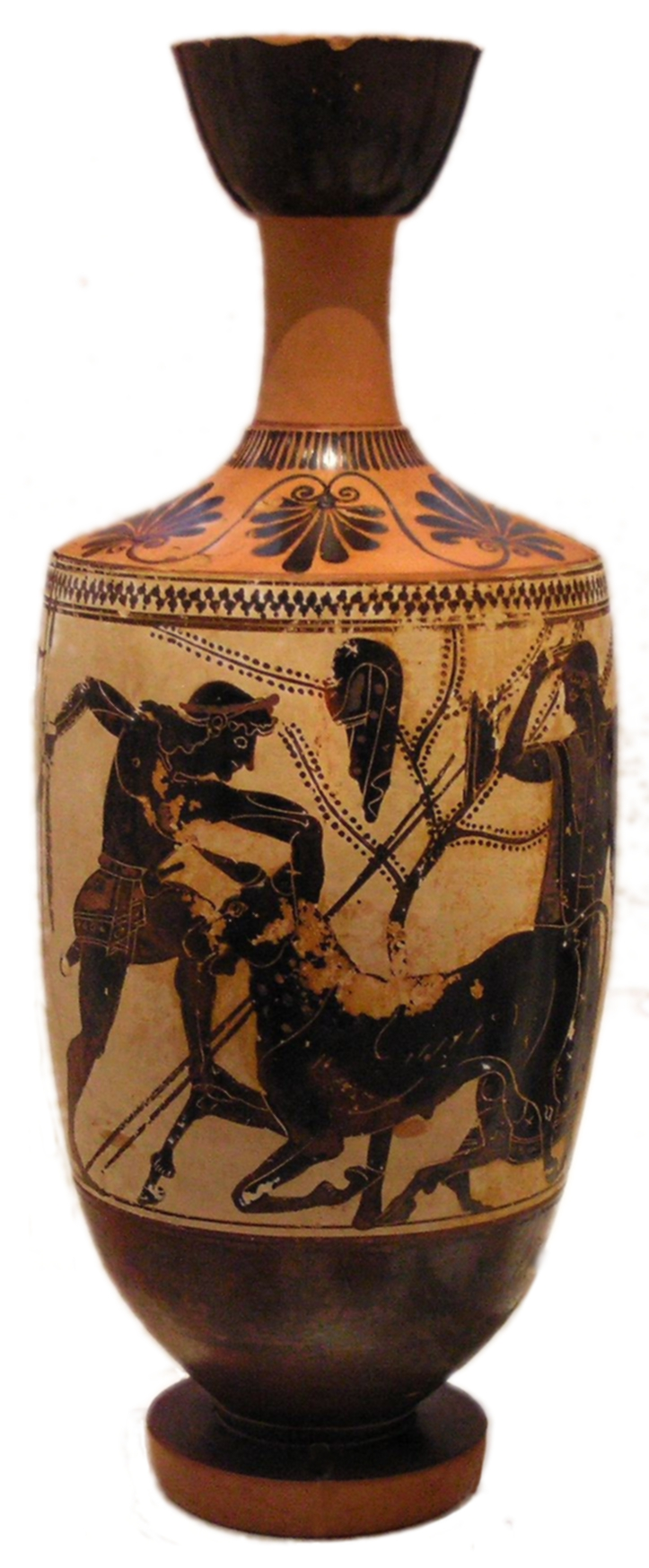
Shoulder or secondary lekythos, c. 500 BC.

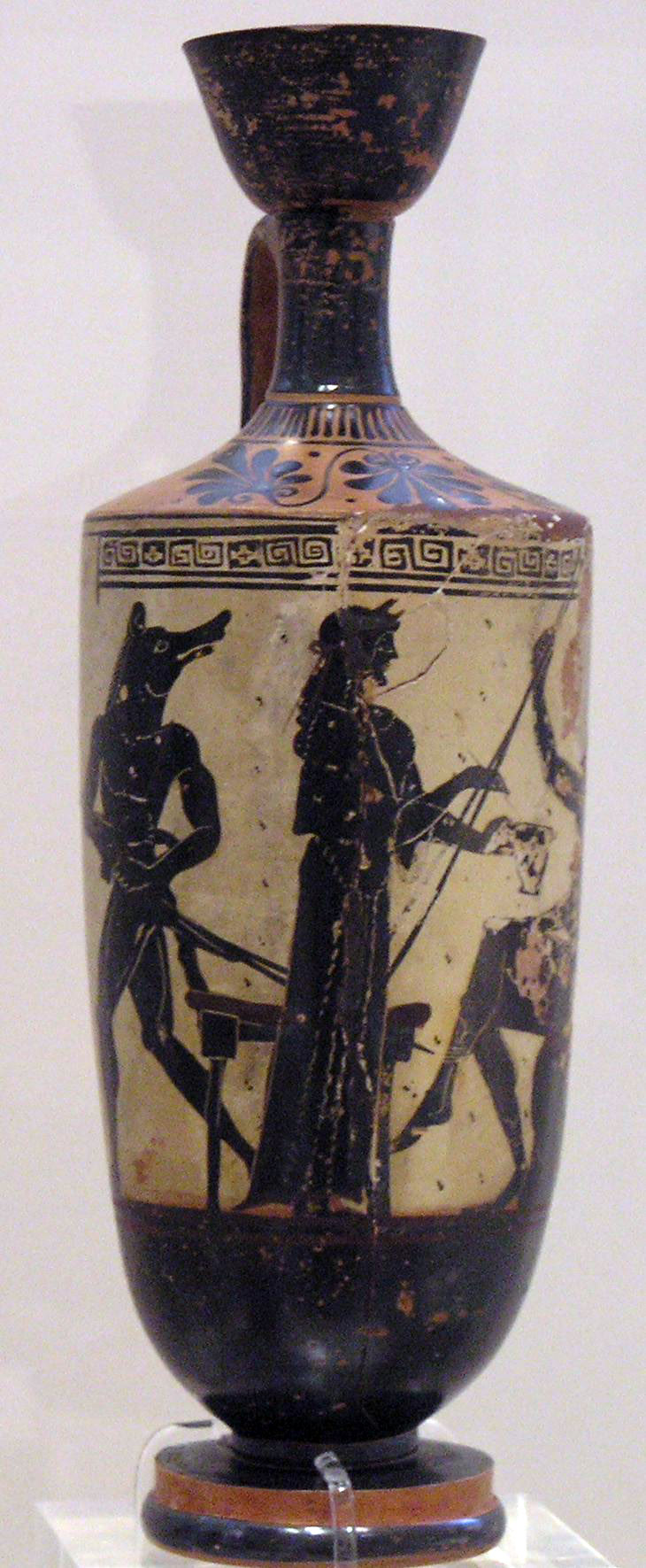
Standard or cylinder lekythos c.490 BCE.

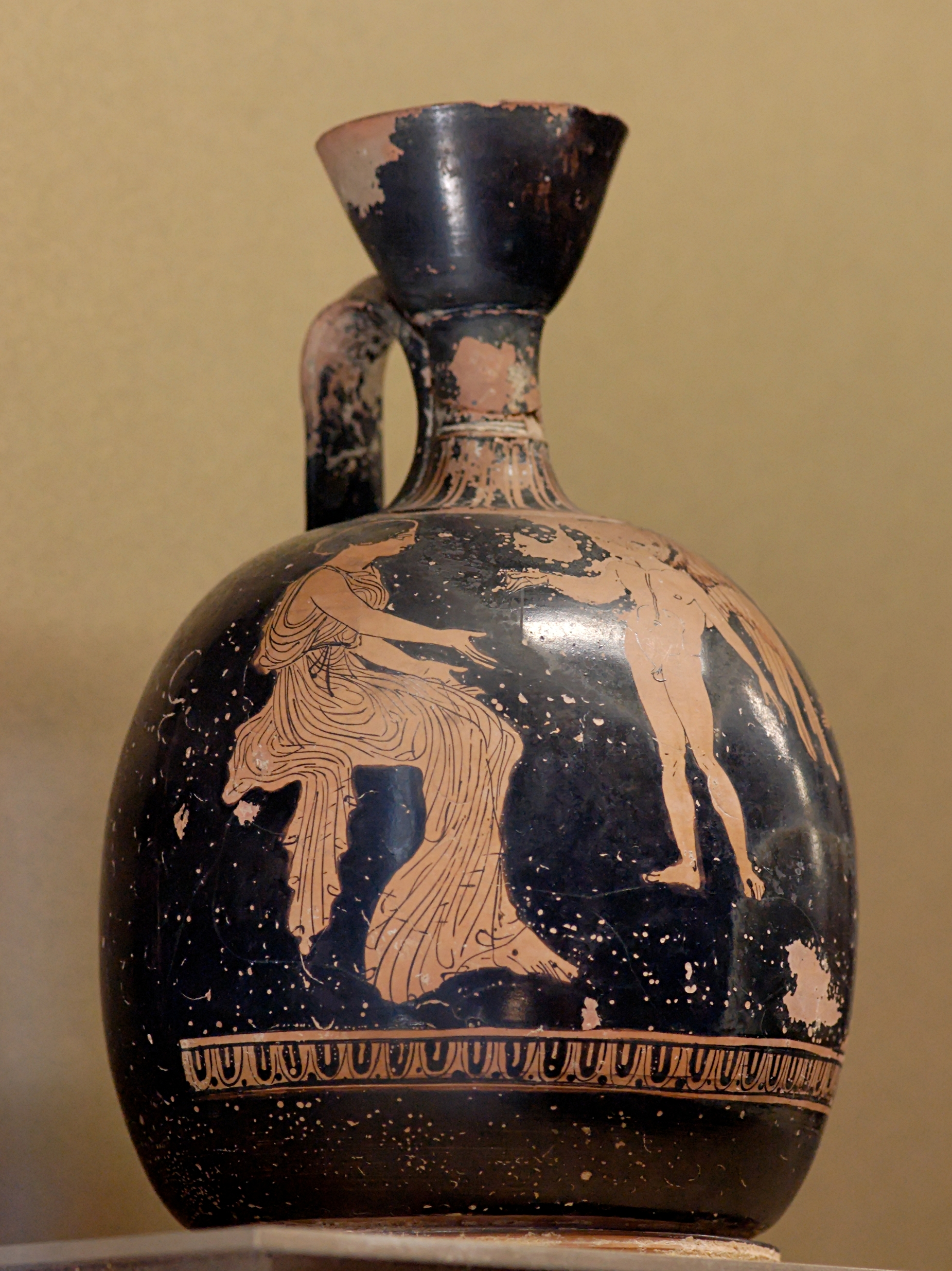
Squat lekythos

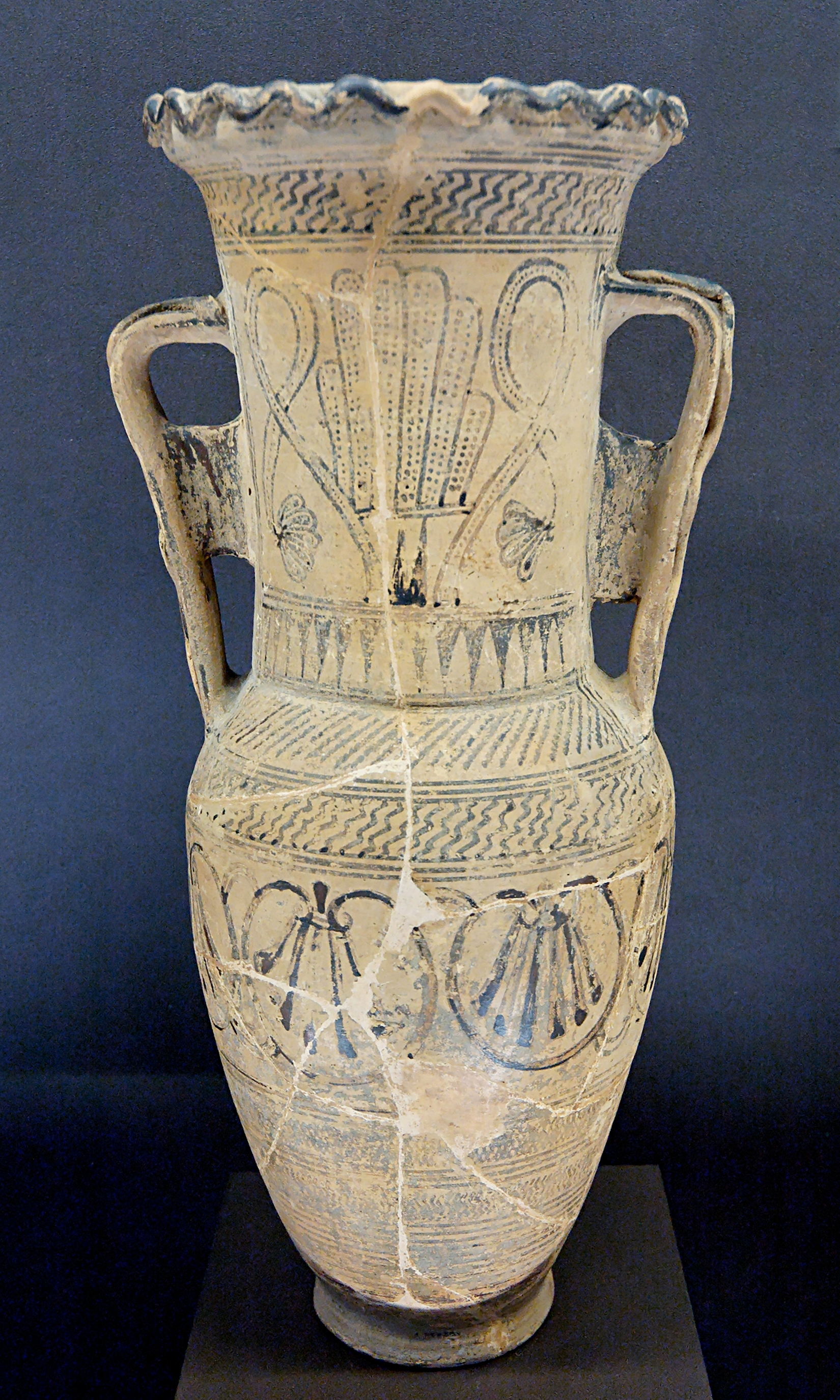
Loutrophoros

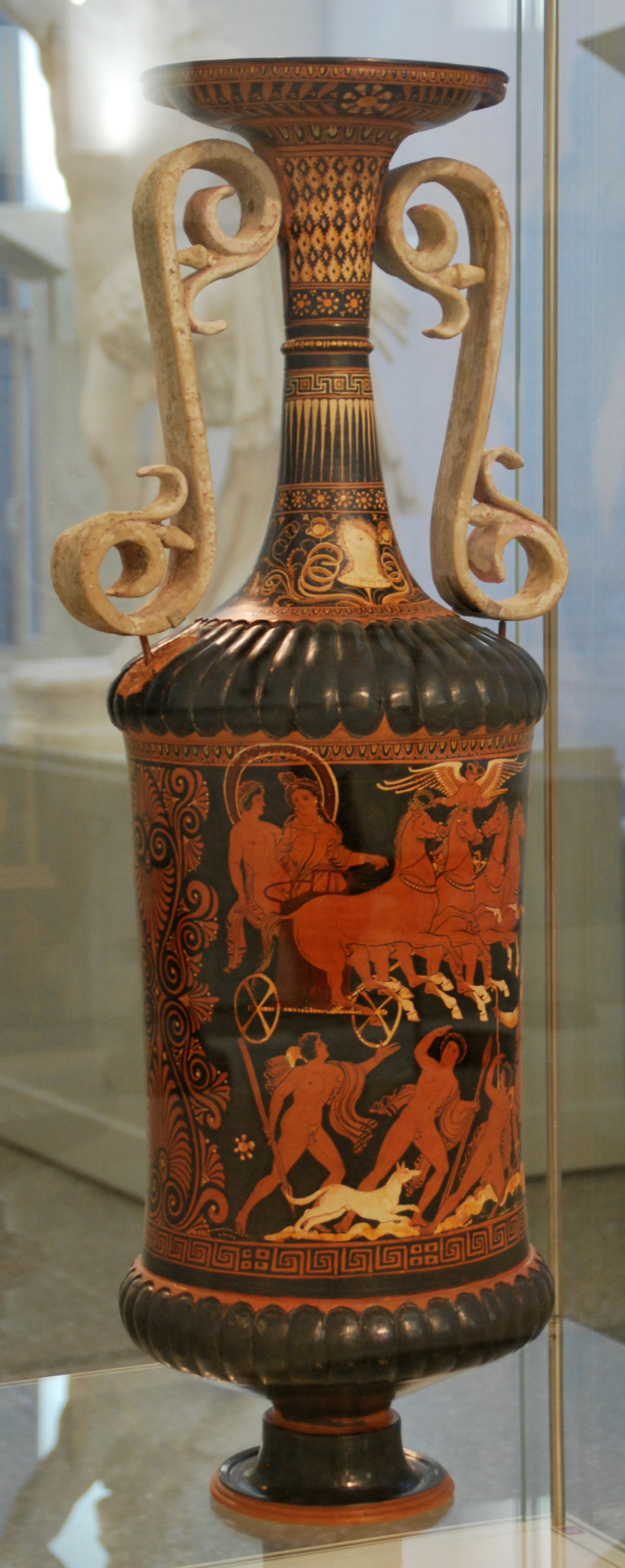
"Huge" Loutrophoros, 330 BC
Other

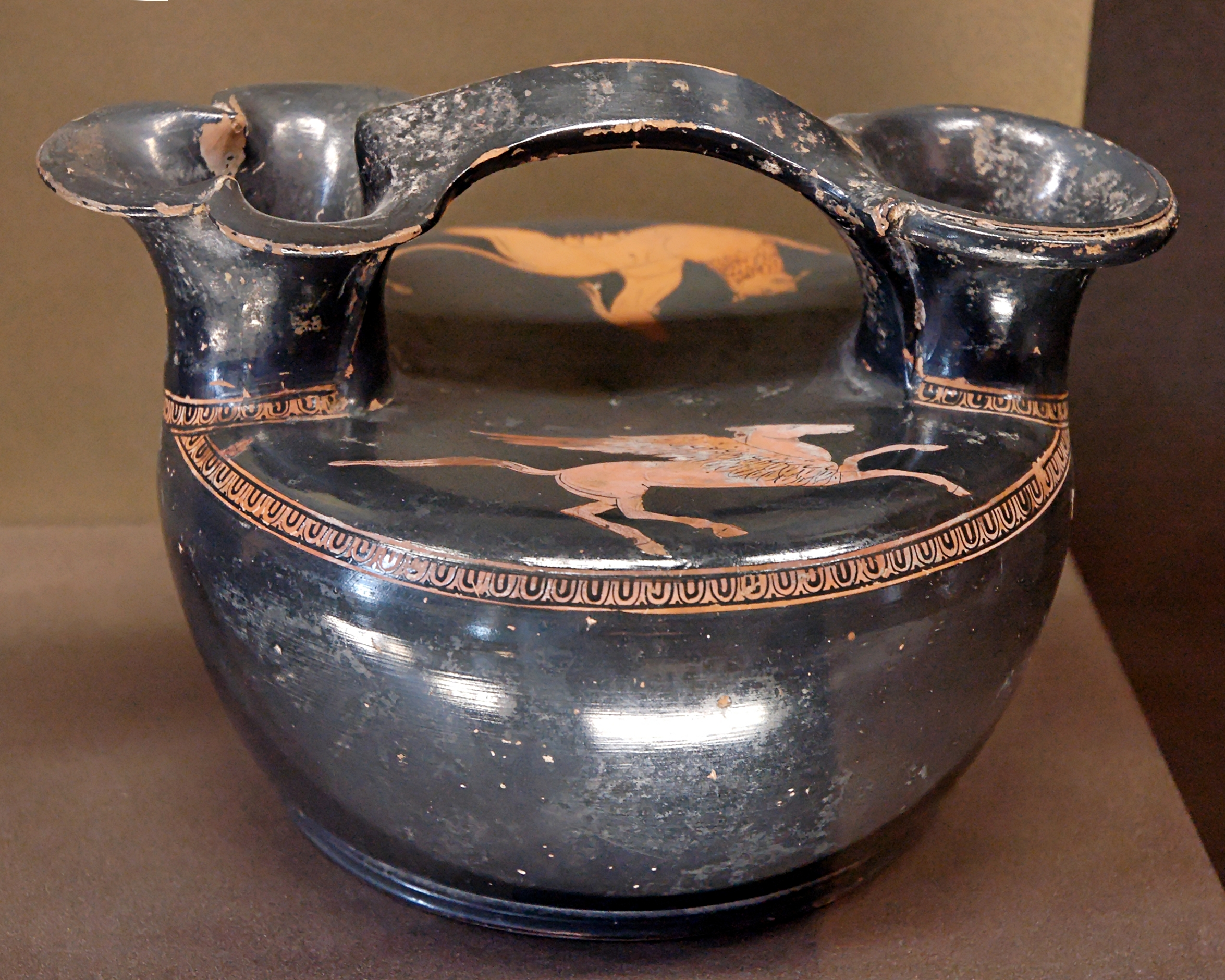
Askos

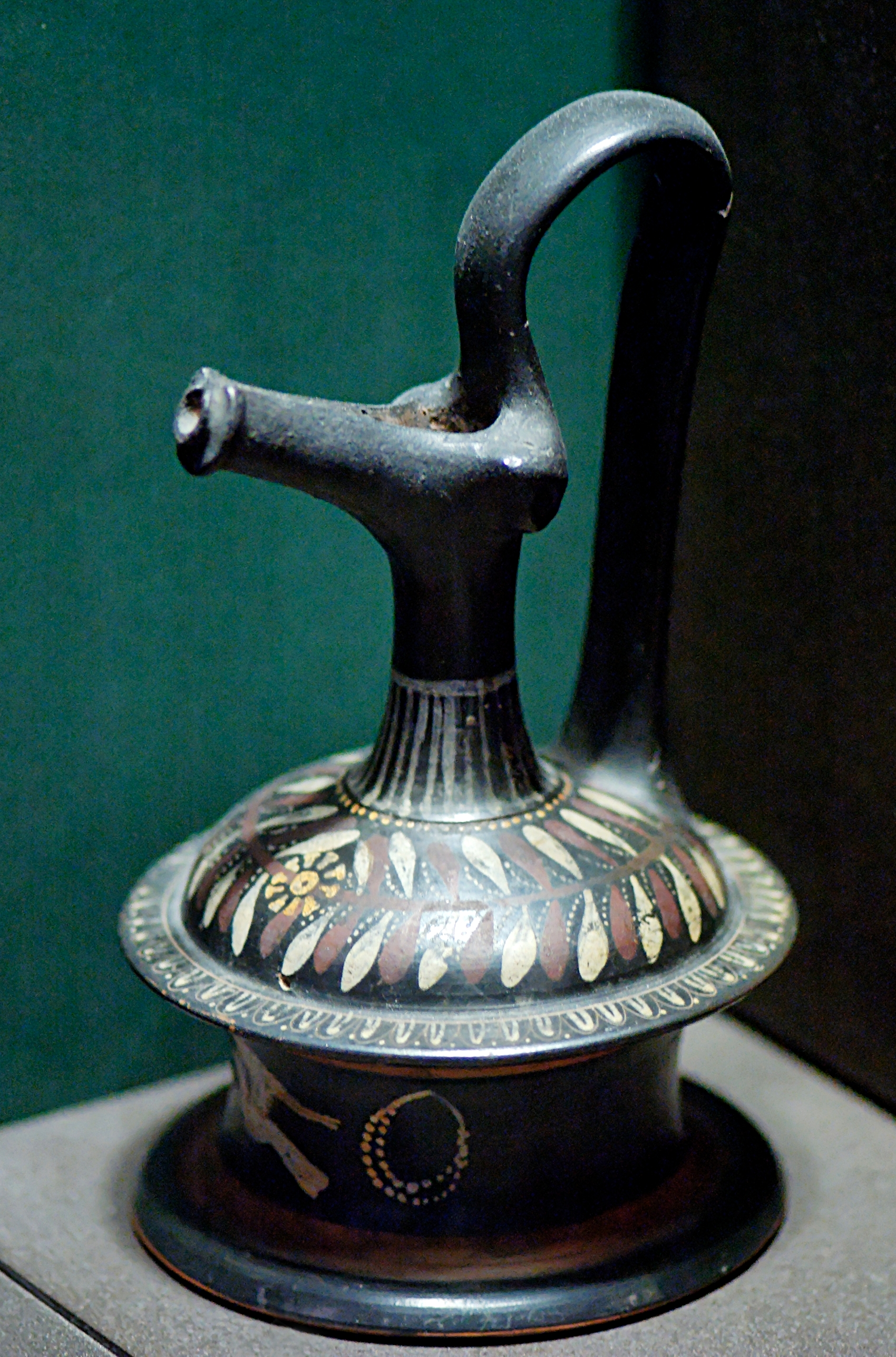
Epichysis

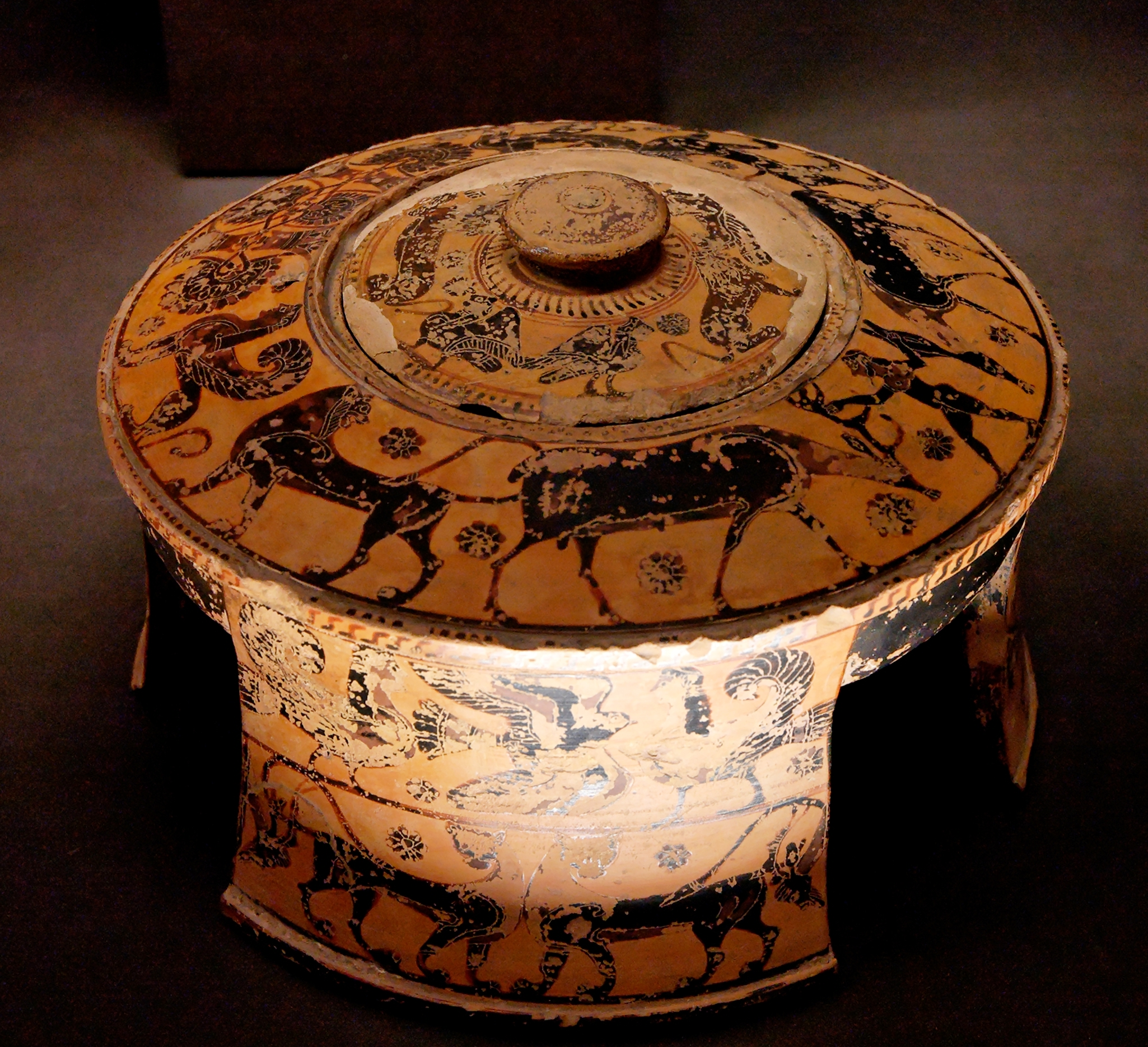
Exaleiptron

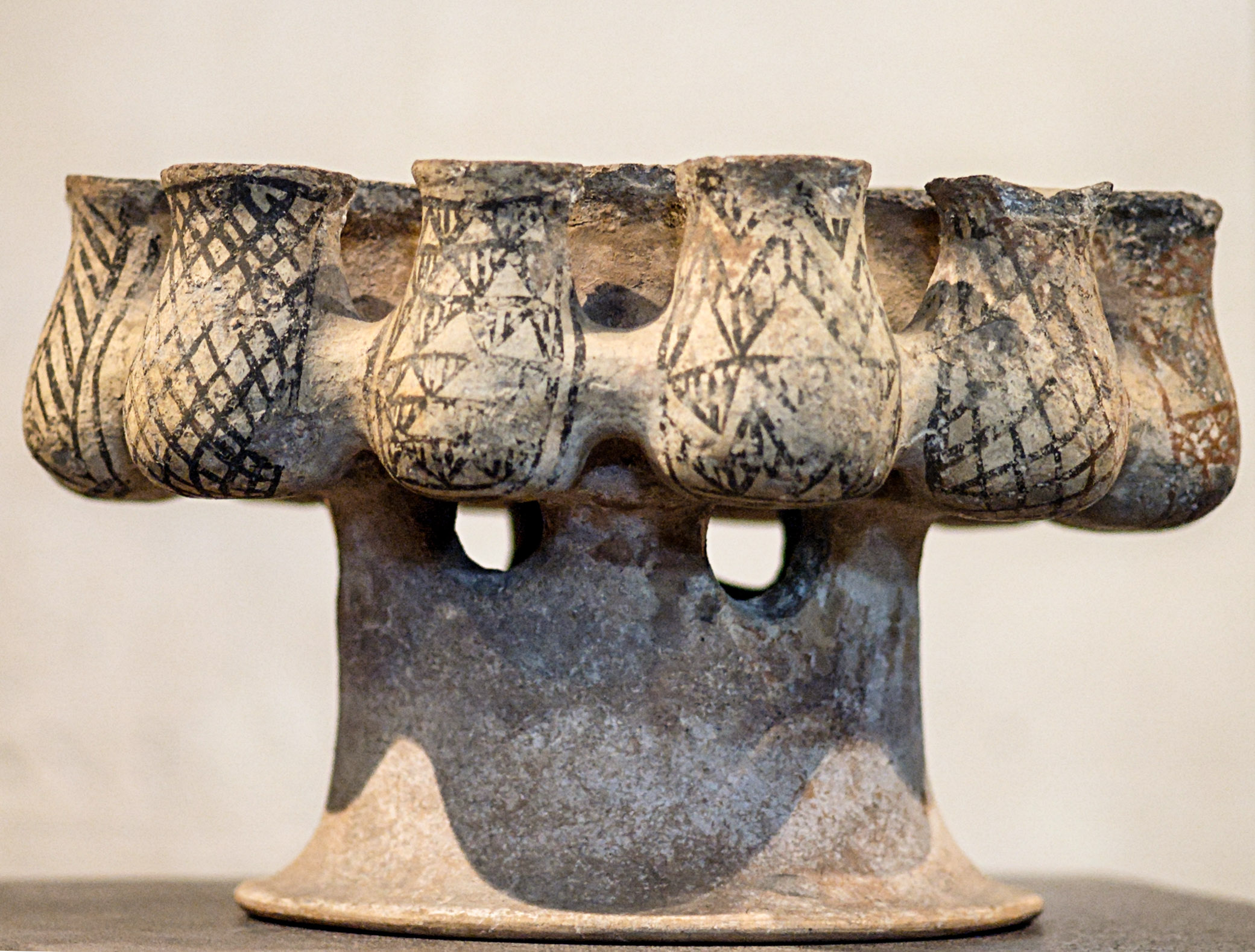
Kernos

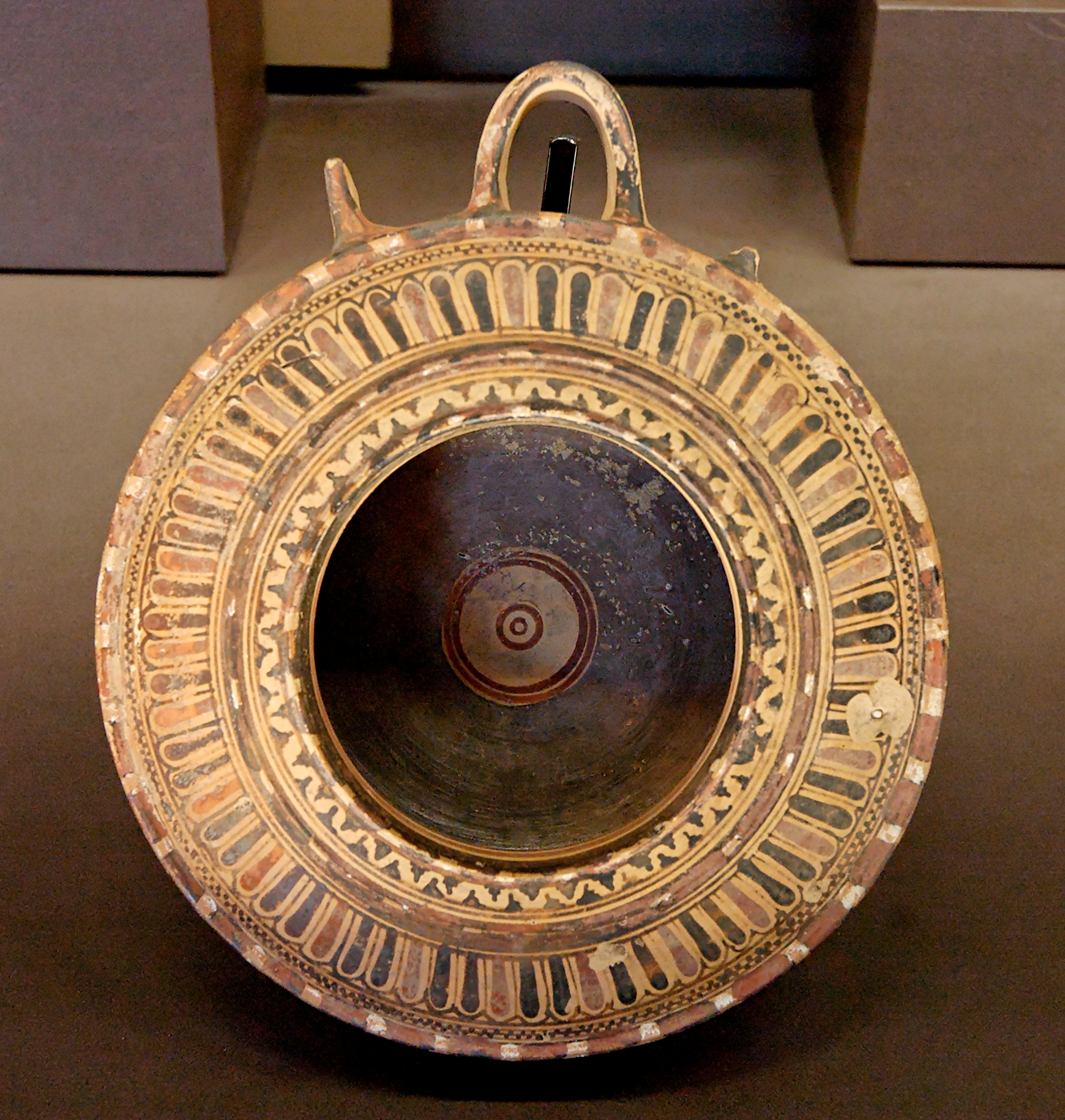
Kothon

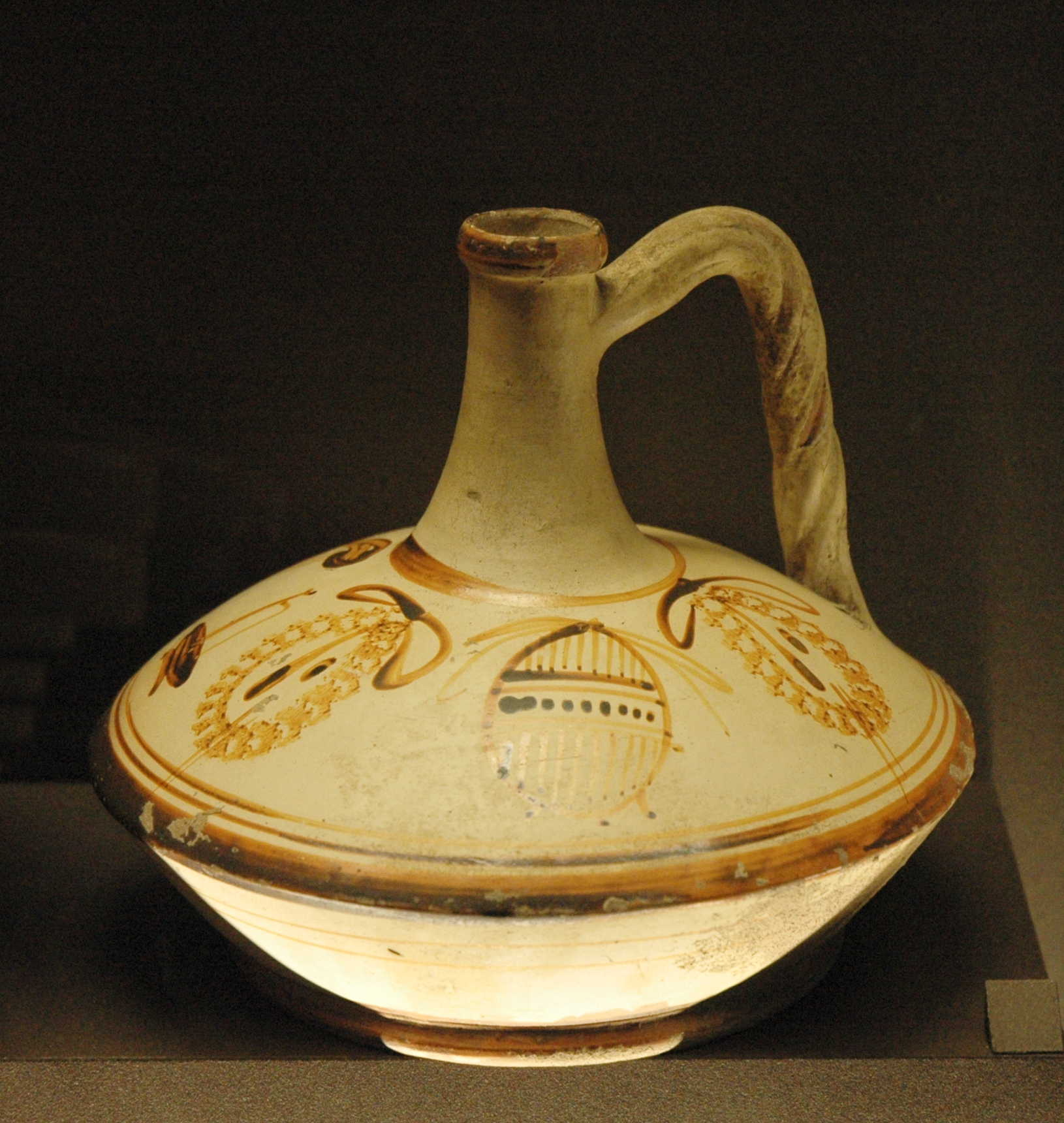
Lagynos

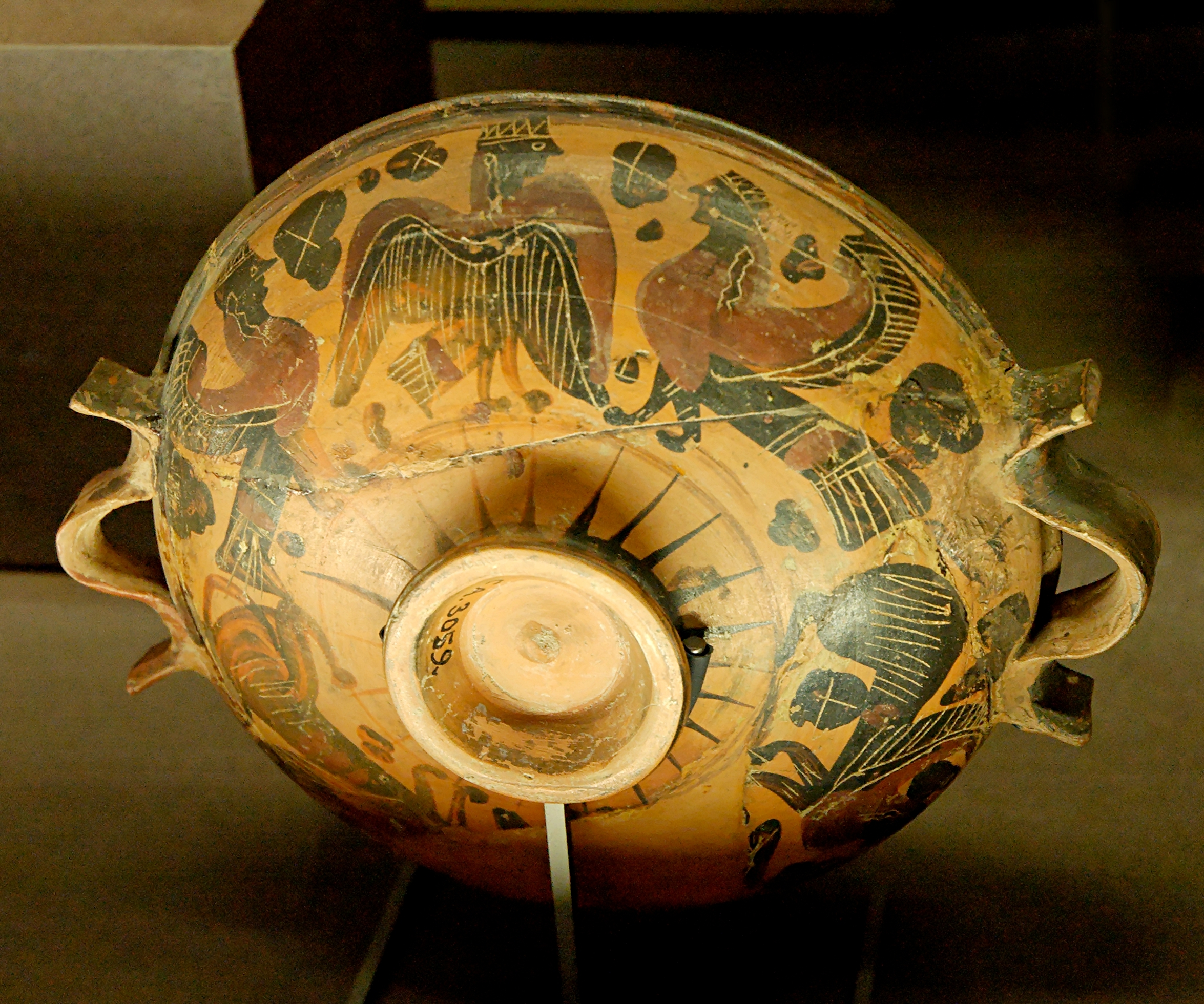
Lekane

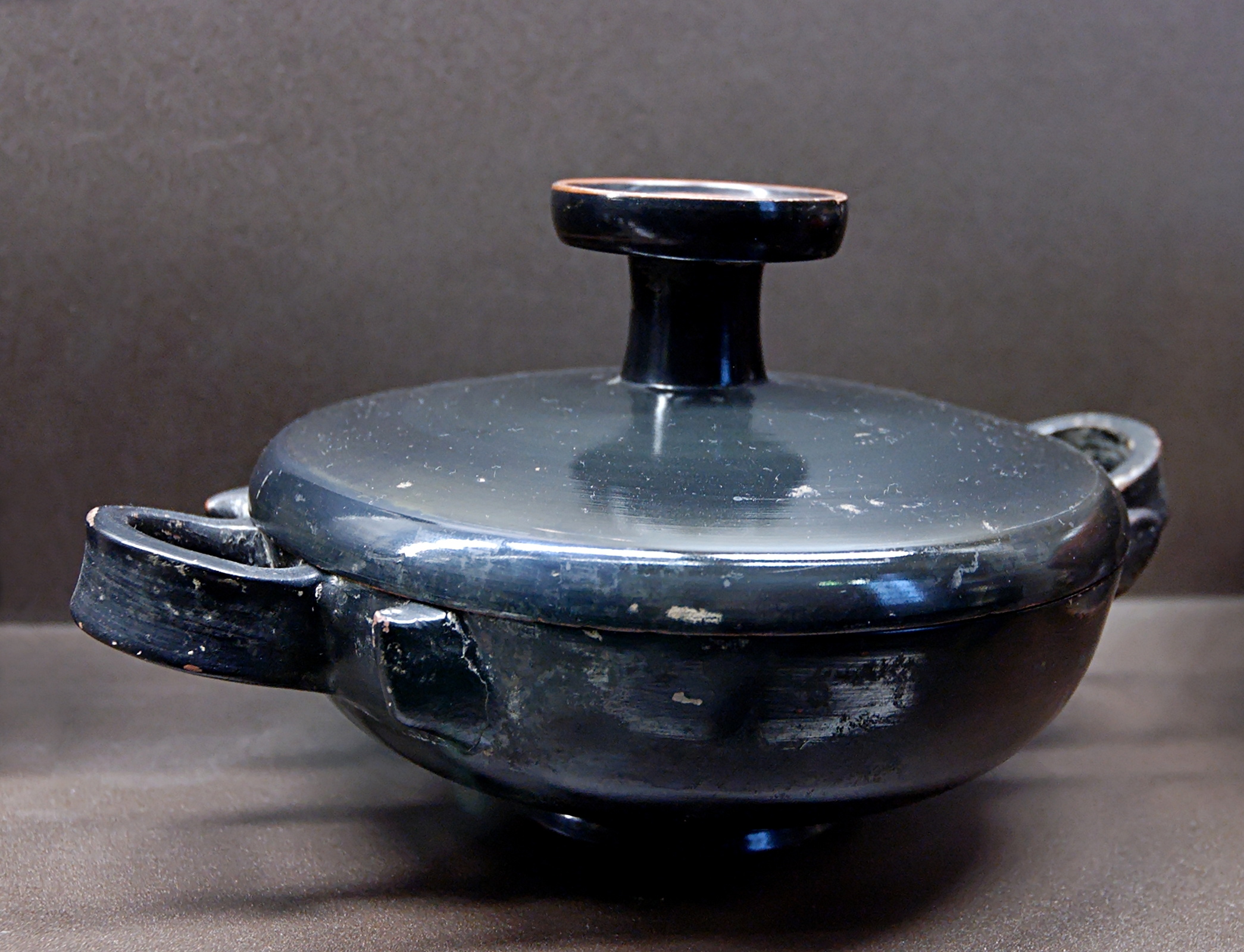
Lekanis

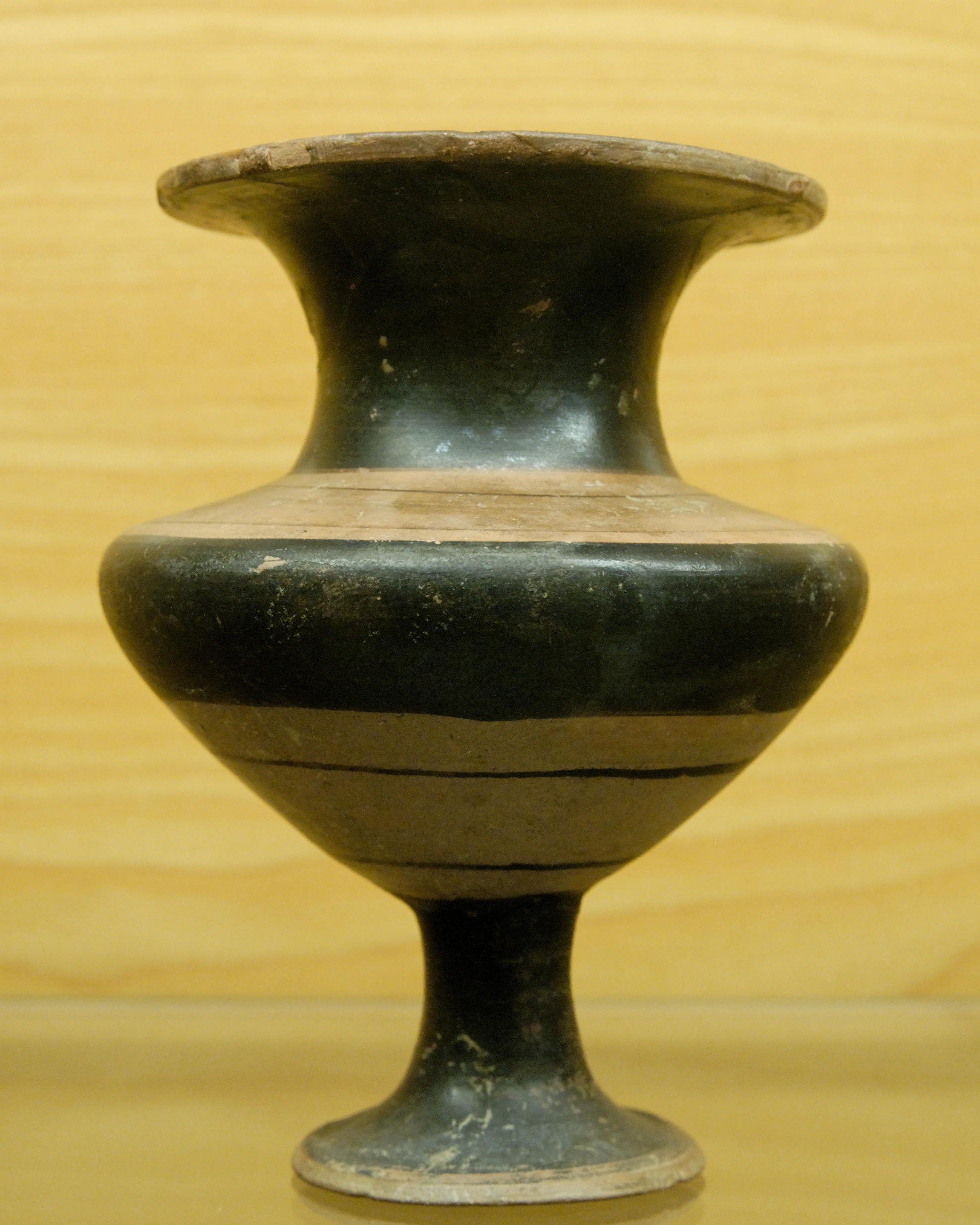
Lydion

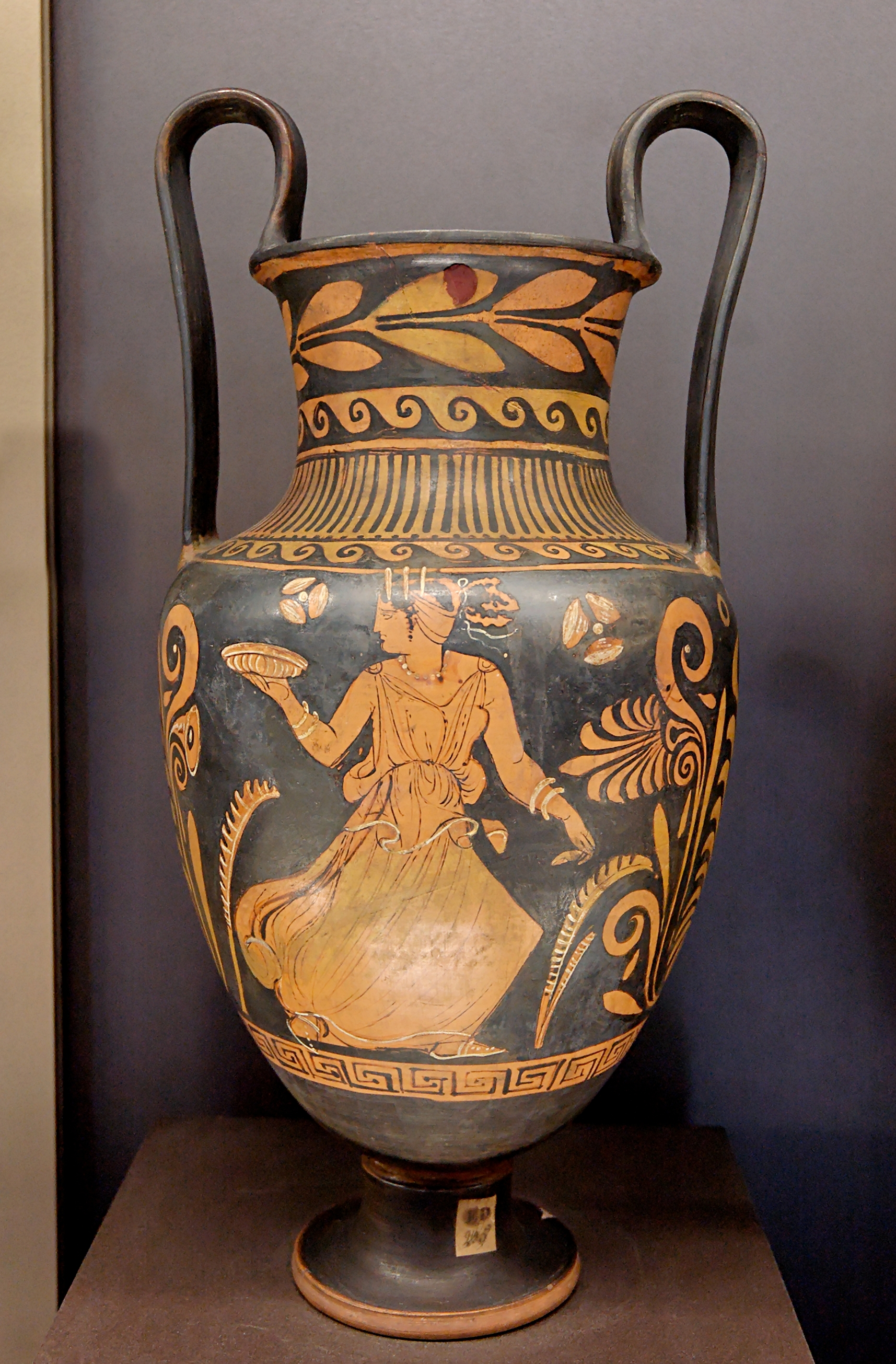
Nestoris (Trozella)

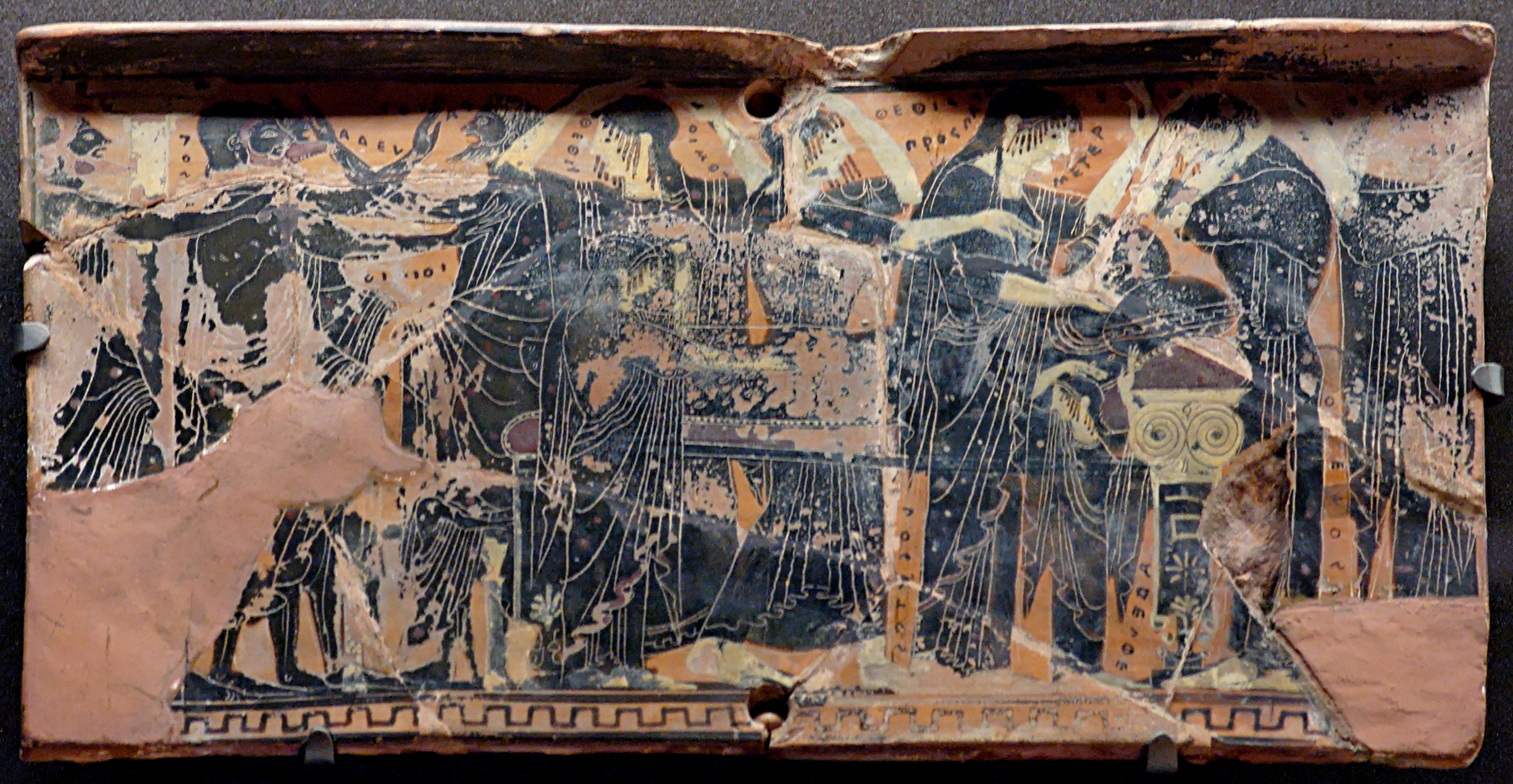
Pinax (plaque)

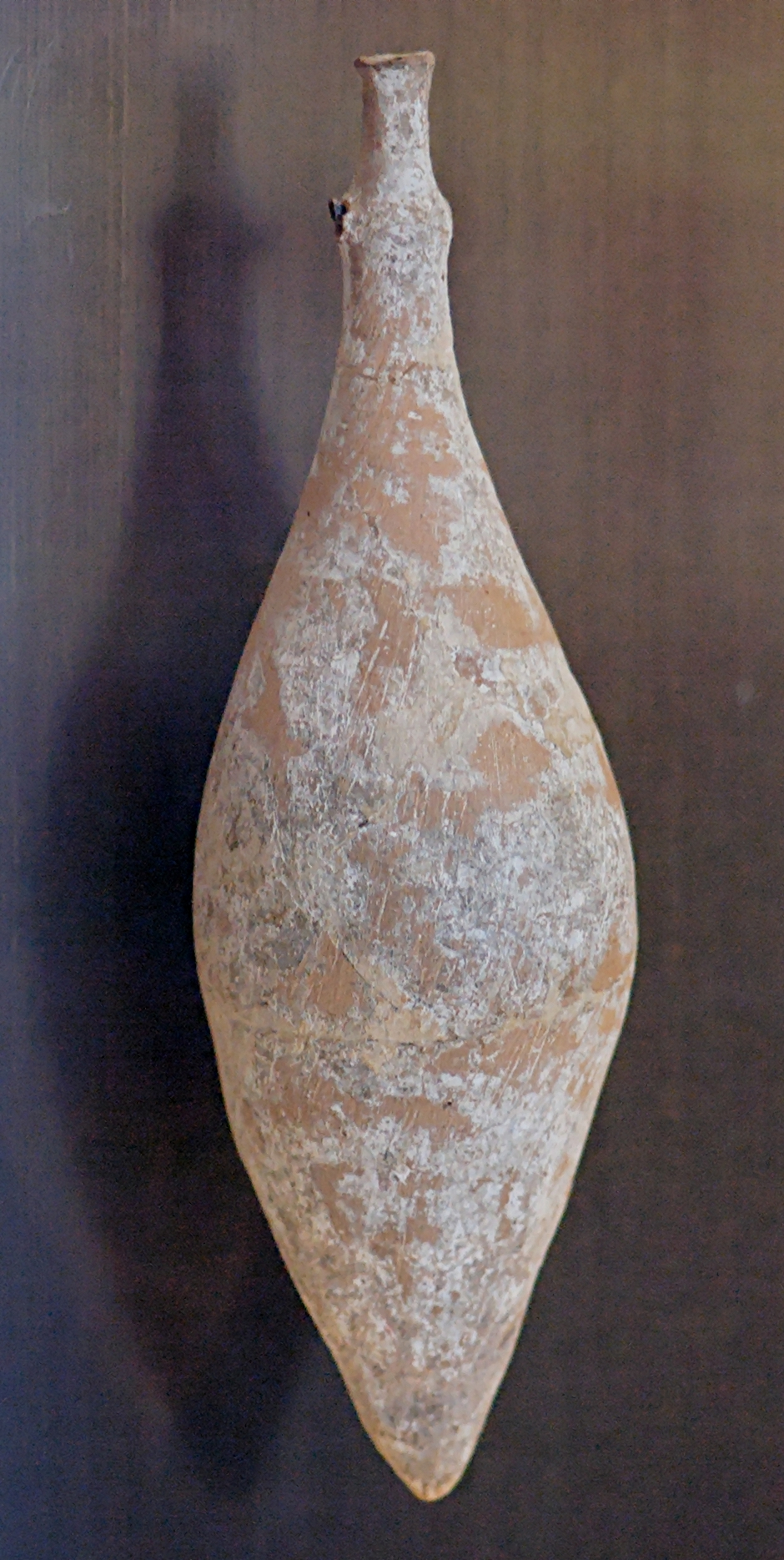
Phormiskos (here a terracotta model)

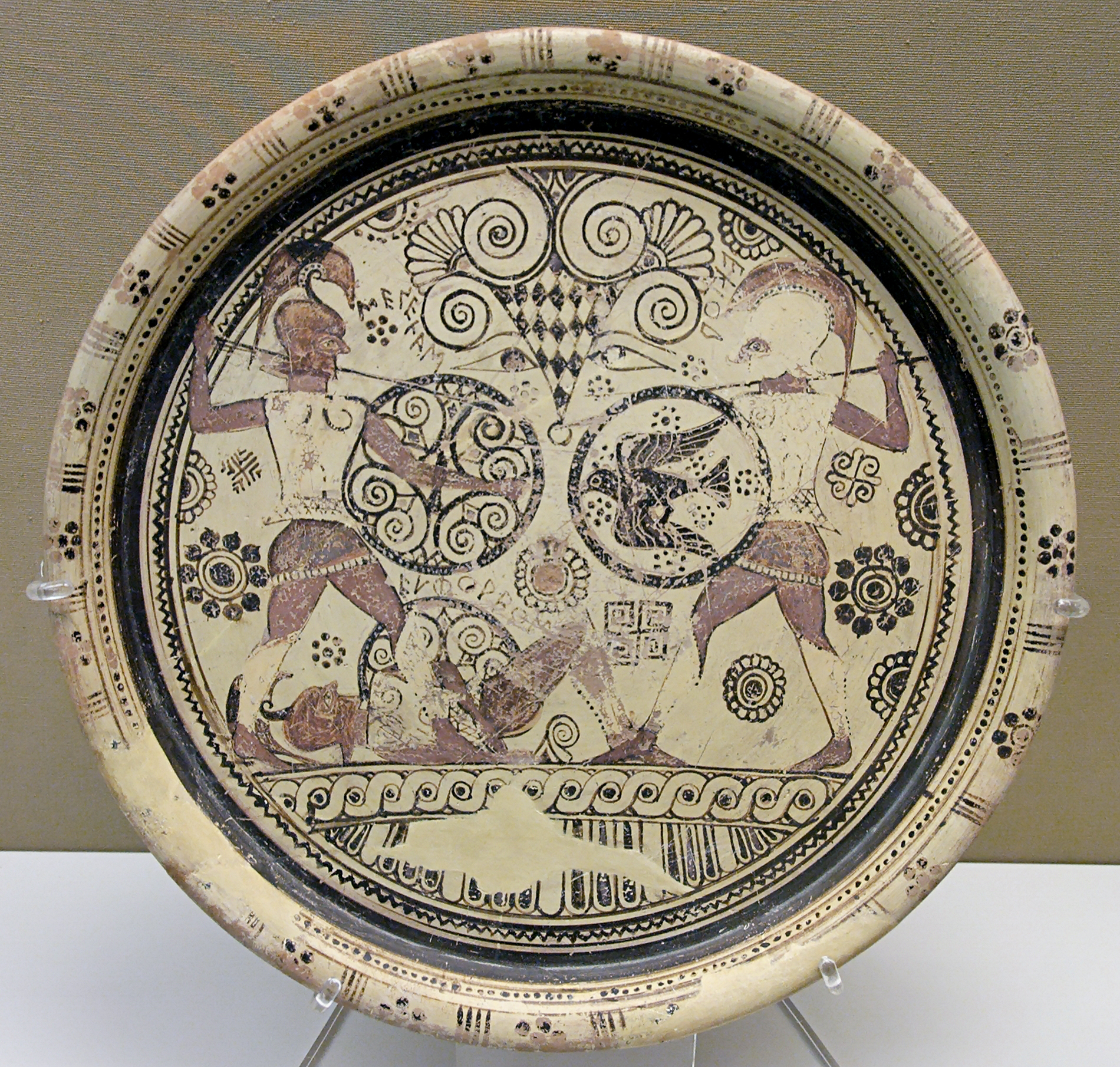
Plate

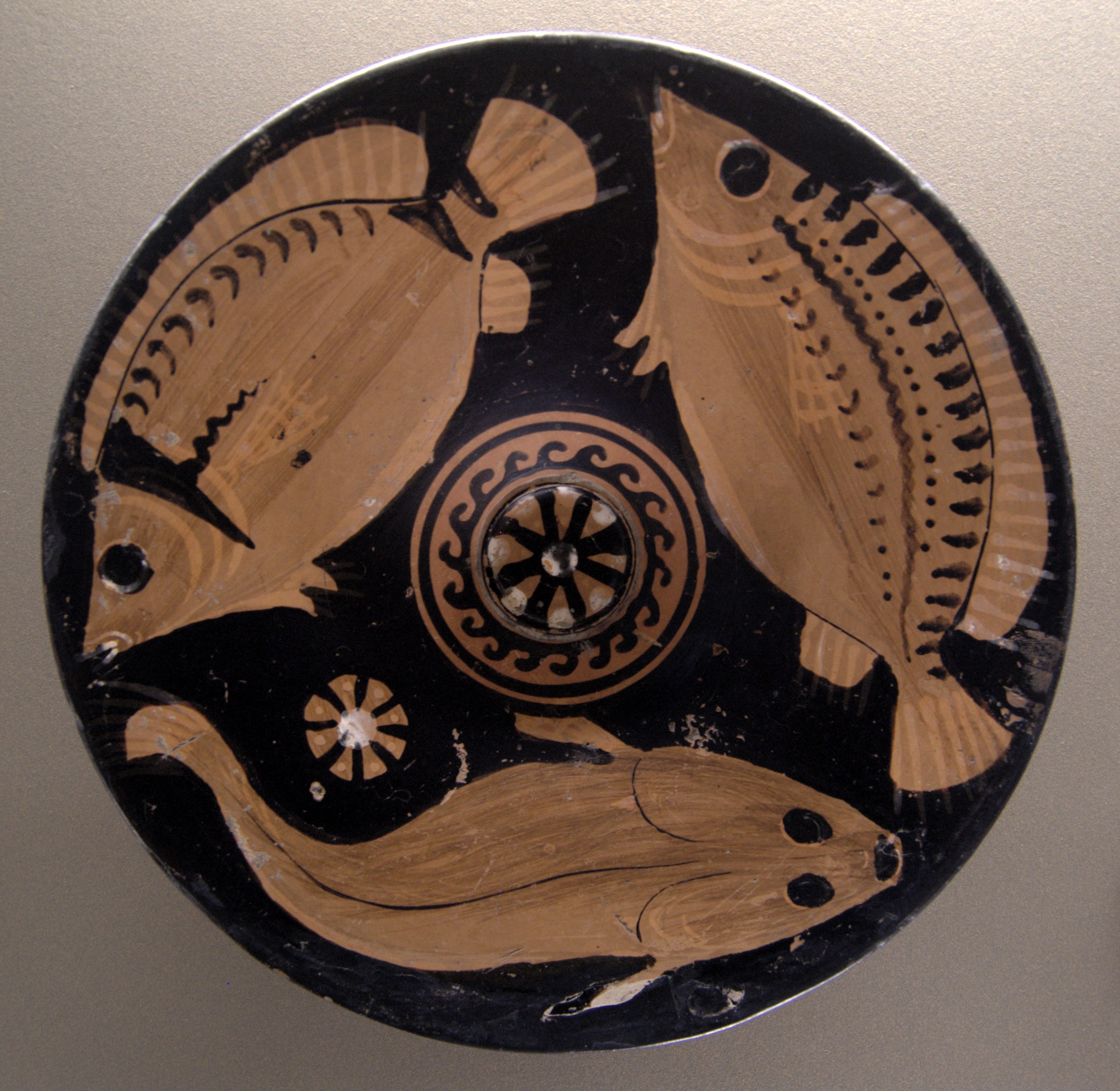
Fish Plate

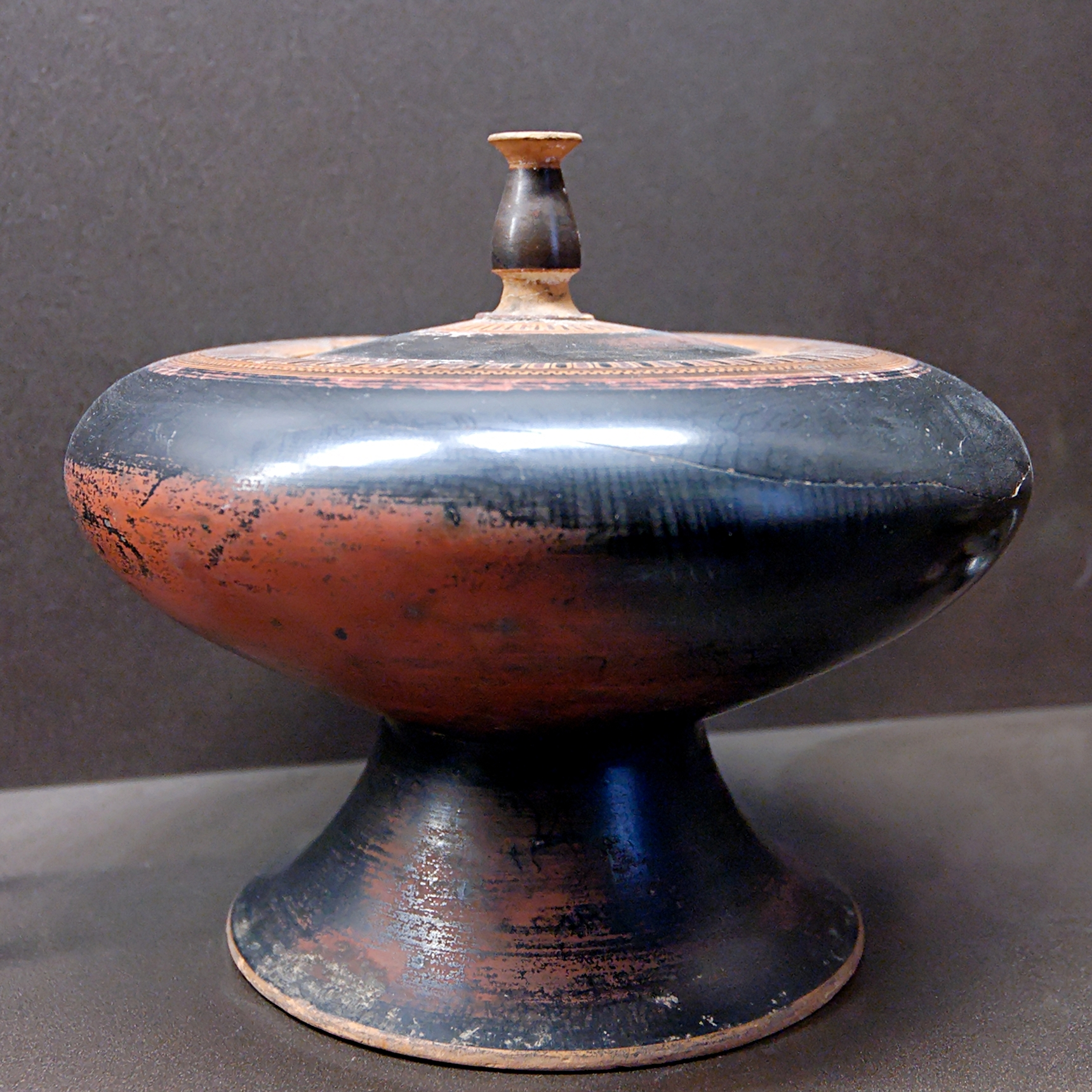
Plemochoe

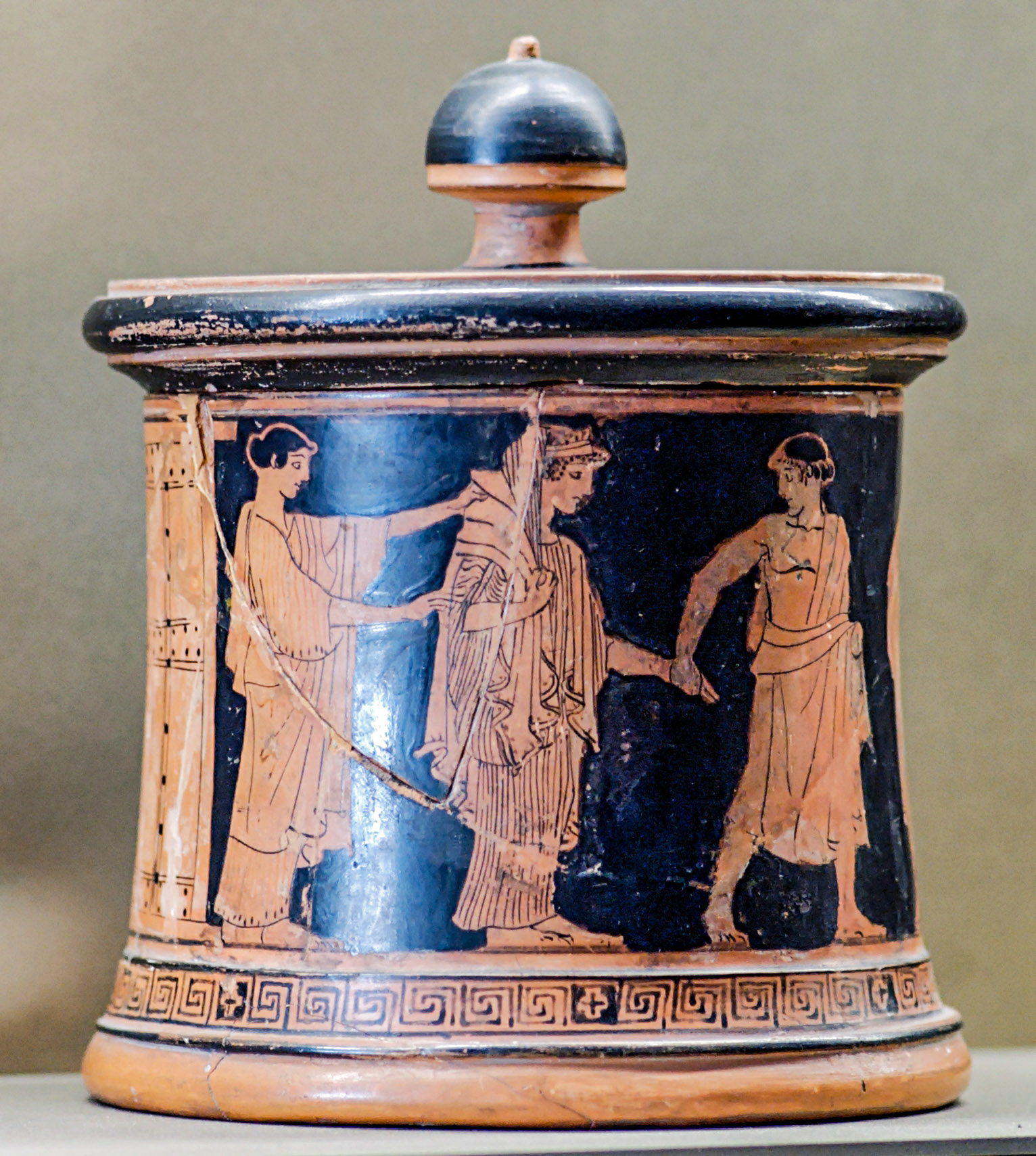
Pyxis, c. 470 BC.

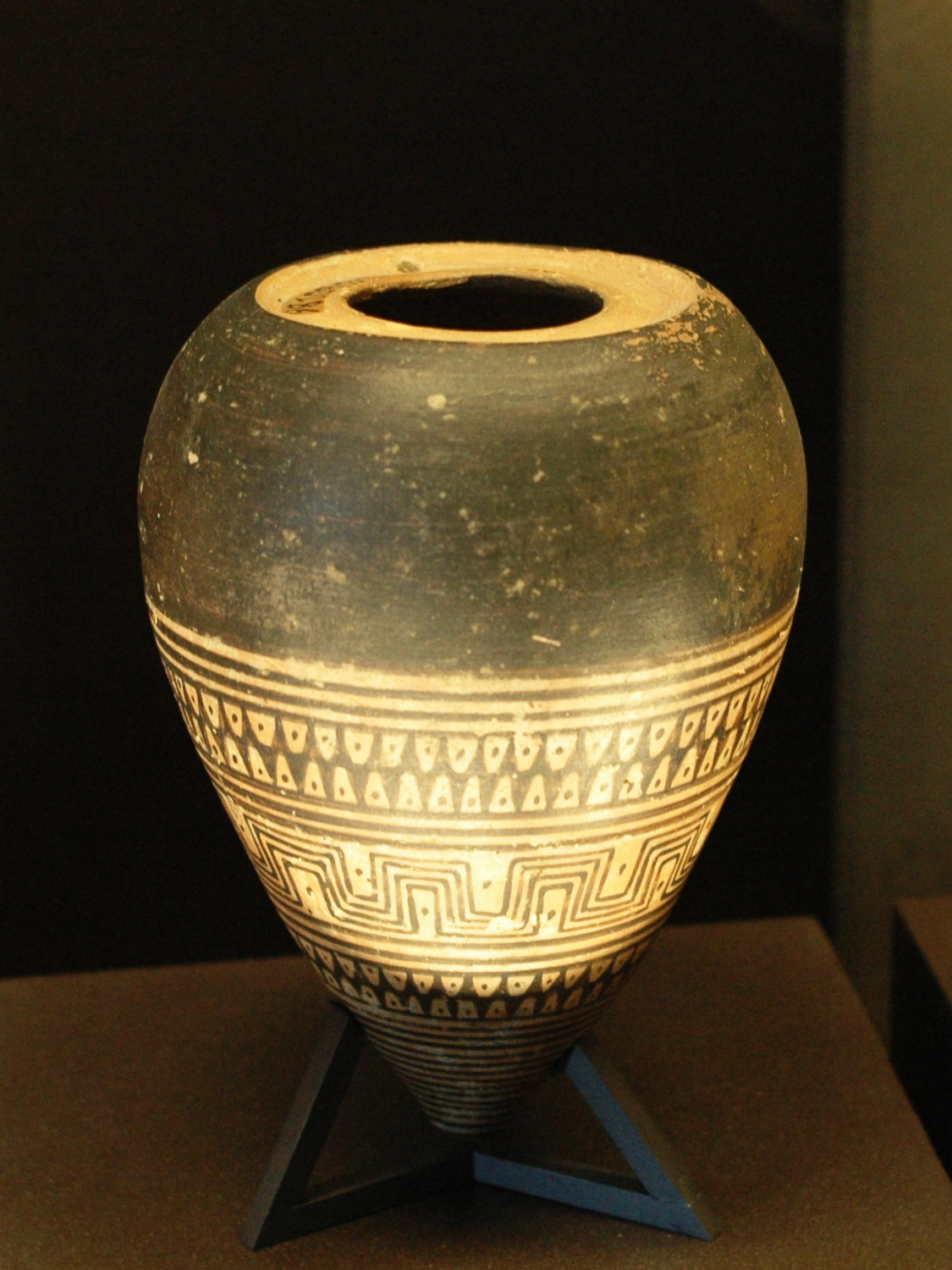
Pointed pyxis

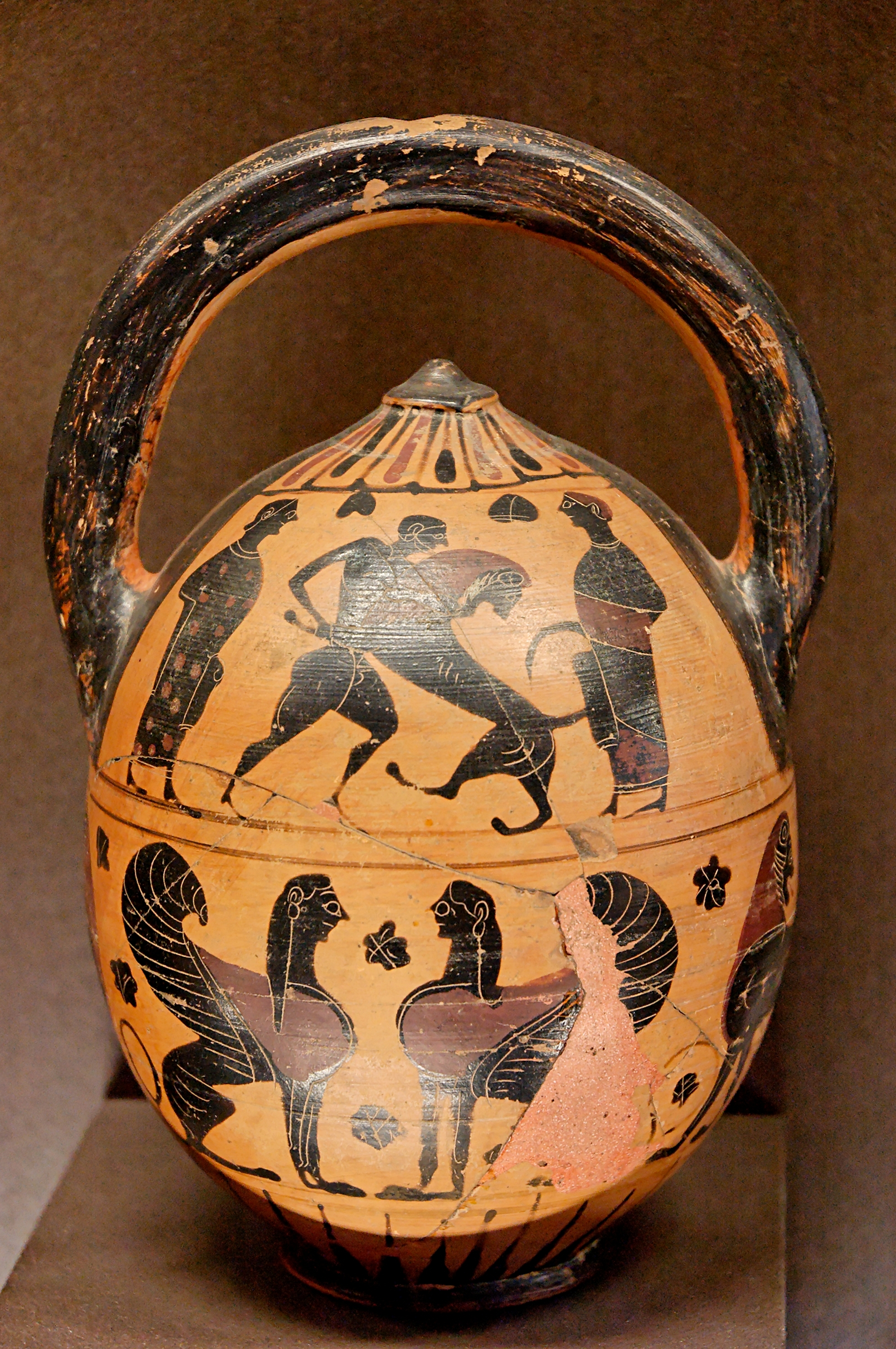
Strainer vase

== Styles of lips and feet ==
Lip styles

Flaring lip

Inverted Echinus lip

Lip in several degrees

Torus lip
Foot styles

Disk foot

Echinus foot

== See also ==
- Ancient Greek art
- Black-figure pottery
- Red-figure pottery
- Greek terracotta figurines
- List of Greek Vase Painters
