= Islamic toilet etiquette =

Rules in Islam when going to the toilet

Islamic toilet etiquette is a set of personal hygiene rules in Islam that concerns going to the toilet. This code of Islamic hygienical jurisprudence is called Qaḍāʾ al-Ḥāja (Arabic: قضاء الحاجة).

Personal hygiene is mentioned in a single verse of the Quran in the context of ritual purification from a minor source of impurity, known as the Wuḍūʾ verse; its interpretation is contentious between different legal schools and sects of Islam. Further requirements with regard to personal hygiene are derived from a Hadith, and these requirements also differ between sects.

== Rules ==
A Muslim must first find an acceptable place away from standing water, people's pathways, or shade. It is advised that it is better to enter the area with the left foot, and it is prohibited to face directly towards the Qibla (direction of prayer towards Mecca) or directly opposite from it. It is reported in the collection of hadith, Sahih al-Bukhari, that just before entering the toilet, Muhammad said: (Arabic: اللَّهُمَّ إِنِّي أَعُوذُ بِكَ مِنَ الْخُبُثِ وَالْخَبَائِثِ, romanized: Allāhumma ʾinnī ʾaʿuḏu bika mina al-Ḫubuṯi wa-al-Ḫabāʾiṯi, lit. '"Oh God, I seek refuge in You from that which is evil (m.) and that which is evil (f.)")'. Following his example, Muslims are advised to say this Dua before entering into the toilet.

While on the toilet, one must remain silent. Talking and initiating or answering greetings are strongly discouraged. When defecating together, two men cannot converse, nor look at each other's genitals. Eating any food while on the toilet is forbidden.

After defecating, the anus must be washed with water using the left hand, or an odd number of smooth stones or pebbles called jamrah or hijaarah (Sahih Al-Bukhari 161, Book 4, Hadith 27). Many jurists agree that toilet paper suffices in place of these stones. Similarly, the penis or vulva should be washed with water using the left hand after urinating, a procedure called istinja. It is commonly done using a vessel known as a aftabeh, lota, or bodna.

When leaving the toilet, one is advised to exit with the right foot and say the Dua for leaving bathroom/toilet: "'الْحَمْدُ لله الَّذِي أَذْهَبَ عَنِّي الأَذَىٰ وَعَافَانِي'Al-ḥamdu lillahi ‘lladhī ‘adhhaba 3annī Al-‘Adhā wa 3āfānī. "Praise be to Allah who relieved me of the filth and gave me relief."

== See also ==
- Ghusl
- Wudu
- Asher yatzar, a Jewish blessing after, e.g., defecation
- Bidet shower
- Lota (vessel)
- Squat toilet
