= Kumgang =

Kumgang or Geumgang may refer to:

- Kumgang County, a county in Kangwon province, North Korea
- Kumgang mountain, a mountain in Kangwon province, North Korea
- Kumgang fat minnow, a freshwater fish, in Kangwon province, North Korea
- The Geum River, in western South Korea
- Geumgang jeondo, a famous landscape painted by Jeong Seon during the reign of King Yeongjo

== See also ==
- Kumgan
