= Natla =

Natla may refer to:

- natla (נַטְלָה), a cup used for ritual handwashing in Judaism, from the Greek word αντλίον (natla)
- Jacqueline Natla, a character in the Tomb Raider games
