= Public toilets in Algeria =

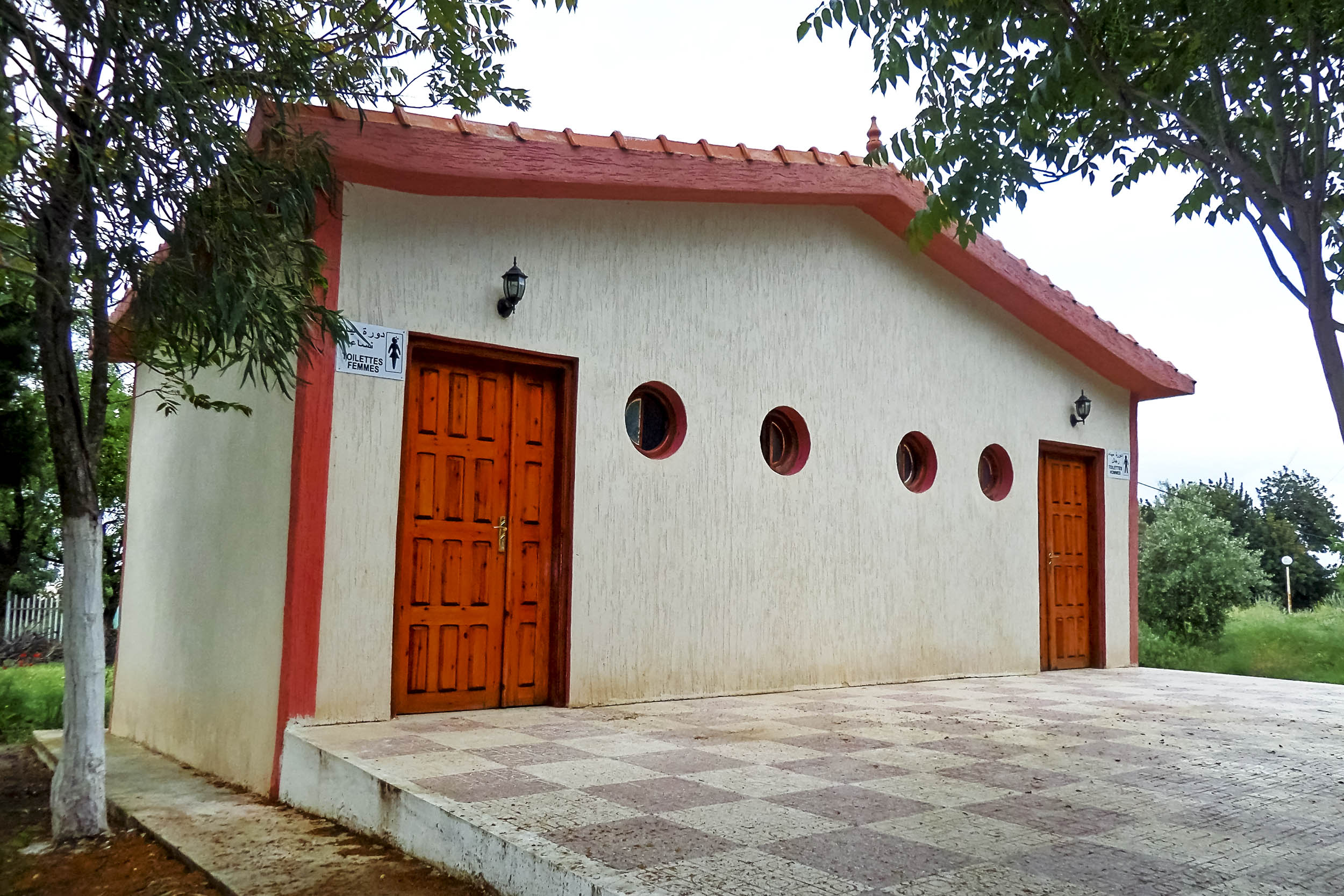
- A public toilet in Algeria

Language of toilets
- Local words: WC
- Men's toilets: Men
- Women's toilets: Women

Public toilet statistics

Public toilet use
- Type: Western style sit toilet

Public toilets in Algeria are few in number, often squat toilets. The ancient Romans constructed public toilets in what is now modern day Algeria.

== Public toilets ==
There are few public toilets. The most common type in more rural areas are squat toilets. Public toilets that had open flow channels was an issue in Algeria, as some of these toilets emptied directly into the sea and caused a number of health related problems as a result.

A 2016 survey of residents of Constantine found that 17.65% though public spaces like kiosks, cafeterias, public toilets and public transport were secure, while 10.58% found these spaces hygienic, 56% found them comfortable and 1.78% said they would use them if they had no other options. 37% said lack of public services like public toilets was an issue in the city.

Starting in the second century AD, the Roman Empire started building public latrines in Italy and North Africa. This improvement was generally widely approved of, and locals integrated using these facilities into their daily lives. Roman public toilets have been located at Djémila. Roman cisterns can be found in the hills of Tiddis. Ancient Roman public latrines were also located at Timgad. Surplus water was often used by Roman aqueducts for flushing sewer systems and public toilets.

84% of homes had a sewage connection. Across the whole of the country, 95% the country had sanitation coverage.

== Regional and global situation impacting public toilets in Algeria ==
An issue in developing countries is toilet access in schools. Only 46% of schools in developing countries have them. Many schools around the world in 2018 did not have toilets, with the problem particularly acute in parts of Africa and Asia. Only one in five primary schools on earth had a toilet and only one in eight secondary schools had public toilets.

There are generally two toilet styles in public bathrooms in Africa. One is a traditional squat toilet. The other is a western style toilet with bowl and a place to sit. Sit flush toilets are the most common type of toilet in North Africa. Islamic teachings suggest using water for cleaning after using the toilet. A popular item for Arab travellers to take with them on trips is a handheld portable bidet.
