= Asmachta (Talmudical hermeneutics) =

Allusion found in Hebrew Bible

In Talmudical hermeneutics, asmachta is an allusion found in the Hebrew Bible for rabbinical prohibitions or any other Halakha. It's an exception in the talmudical hermeneutics, since it doesn't base the law on the cited verse, but uses the verse as a hint.

Sometimes it isn't clear whether the verse has been quoted as an asmachta or as a source, which can lead to controversy over the de'oraita or derabanan quality of the law. An example of such a case is the controversy over berakhah she'eina tzricha or berakhah levatala, the prohibition to say a prayer outside its context. The Talmud says "Anyone who recites an unnecessary blessing violates the biblical prohibition: Thou shalt not take the name of the Lord thy God in vain". While Maimonides sees it as a source, the Tosafists see it as an asmachta.

== Examples ==
- Netilat Yadaim - part of ritual washing in Judaism, in which only the hands are washed as a purification ritual. Rabbinic Halakha requires this ritual to be done before eating bread. The Talmud attributes this law to asmachta— regarding a zav, the Torah says: "And whomsoever he toucheth that hath the issue, and hath not rinsed his hands in water...". The Talmud takes this as an allusion for a general rinsing of the hands.
- Measures - the specific amounts and sizes of Halakhic objects. For example, the minimum width of Tefillin straps is known through a law given to Moses at Sinai to be the size of a grain of barley. This and other halakhic measures have their source in asmachta; the Talmud uses the verse of the Seven Species as an allusion for all measures that are based on the sizes of various fruits.

== Meaning ==
According to Maimonides, this is only a mnemonic the sages gave, as an aid to memory.

The answer will be that it is 'a law of Moshe from Sinai,' and the sizes do not have a source from which to extrapolate them by one of the ways of reasoning, and they do not have a hint in all of the Torah, but [rather] this commandment was associated with this verse as a [mnemonic], so that it will be known and remembered, but it is not the subject of the verse.

The Kuzari makes a similar statement. "There is a wide difference between these injunctions and the verse. The people, however, accepted these seven laws as tradition, connecting them with the verse as aid to memory."

Yom Tov of Seville objects to Maimonides' explanation, and claims that God himself devised the various asmachta sources and embedded them in the Torah as allusions to be used by the sages.
