= Pitcher (container) =

Container with a spout used for storing and pouring liquids

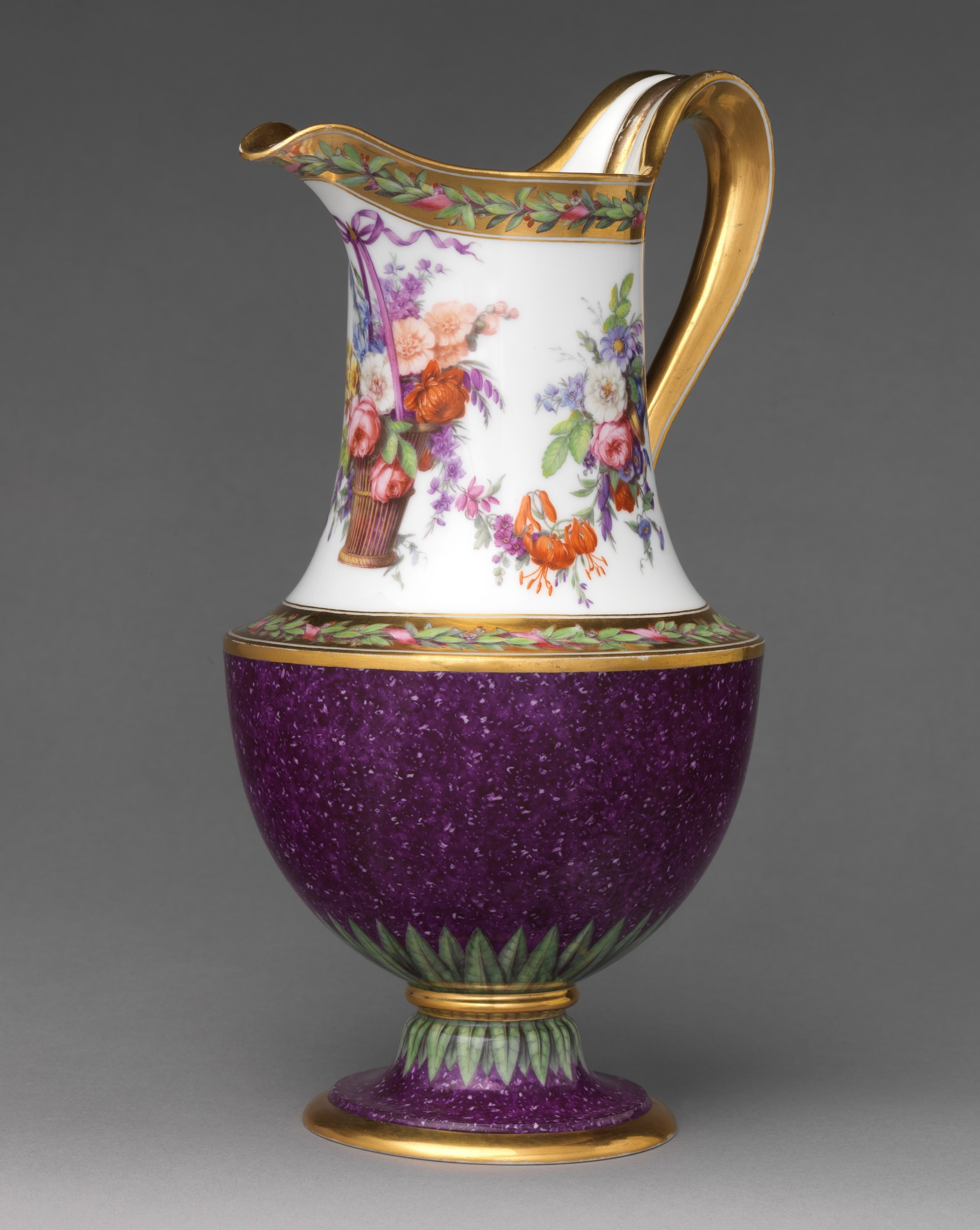
French ewer, 1795, hard-paste porcelain, height: 25.4 cm, Metropolitan Museum of Art (New York City)

In American English, a pitcher is a container with a handle and a spout, used for storing and pouring liquids. In English-speaking countries outside North America, such a container is called a jug.

Ewer is an older word for a pitcher or jug of any type, though tending to be used for a vase-shaped pitcher, often decorated, with a base and a flaring spout. The word is now unusual in informal English describing ordinary domestic vessels. A notable modern ewer is the sailing regatta's America's Cup.

== Etymology ==
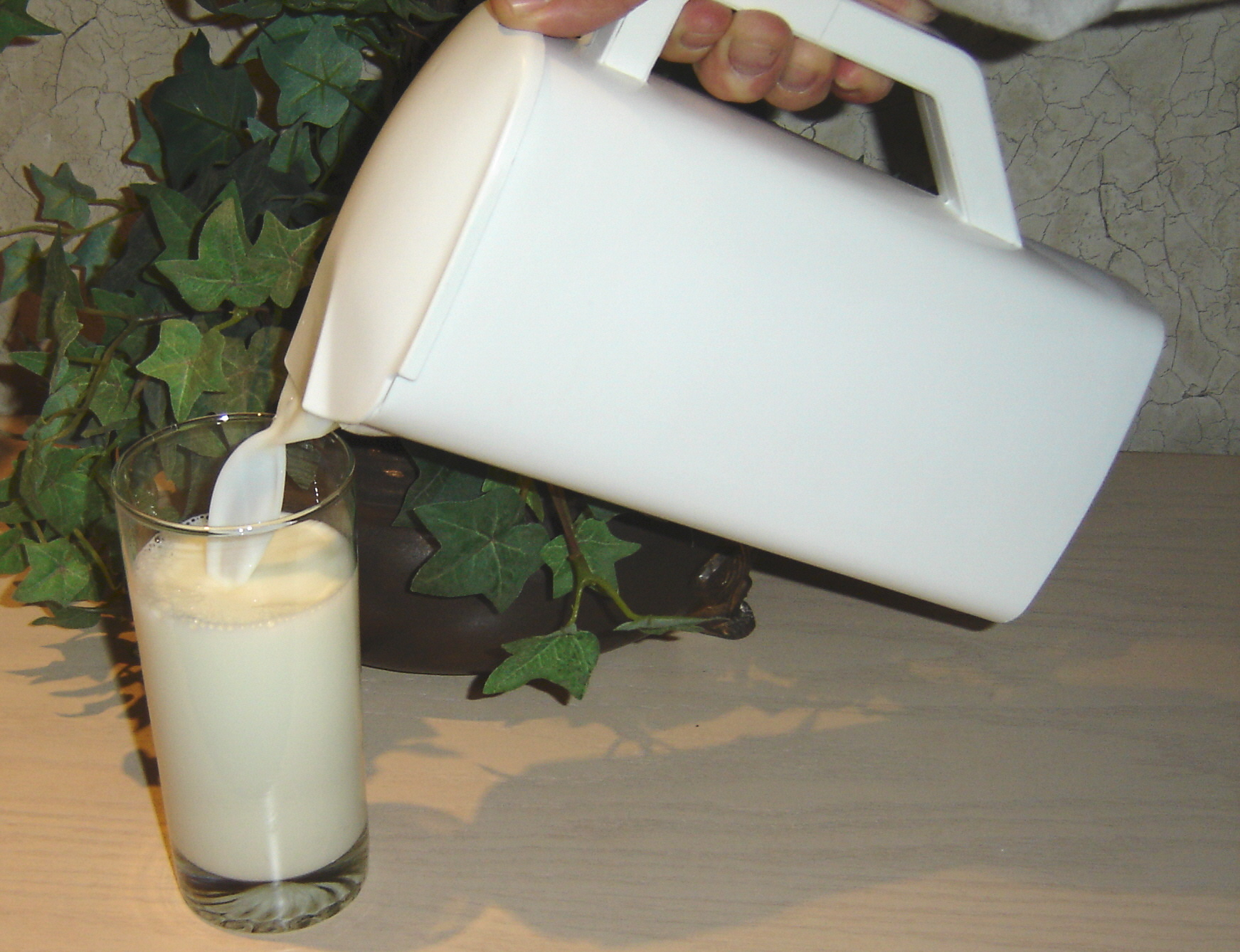
Plastic pitcher used for milk.

The word pitcher comes from the 13th-century Middle English word picher, which means earthen jug. The word picher is linked to the Old French word pichier, which is the altered version of the word bichier, meaning drinking cup.

The word's origin goes as far back to the Medieval Latin word bicarium from the Greek word βῖκος : bîkos, which meant earthen vessel. Compare with Dutch beker, German Becher, English beaker and Italian bicchiere.

== Ancient examples ==
In the typology of Greek vase shapes jug or pitcher shapes include various types of oenochoe, and the olpe.

An early mention of a pitcher occurs in the Book of Genesis, when Rebekah comes to Abraham's servant bearing a vessel with water. In the Book of Judges, Gideon gives empty pitchers containing lamps to three hundred men divided into three companies. In the gospels of Mark and Luke, Jesus tells two of his disciples to go into the city of Jerusalem, where they will meet a man carrying a pitcher of water (in Greek κεράμιον ὕδατος : kerámion hydatos), and instructs them to follow him to locate the upper room to be used for the Last Supper.

The pitcher of Marwan Ibn Mohammad, on display at the Museum of Islamic Art in Cairo, predates the 8th century.

During the Tang dynasty, ewers fashioned from glazed earthenware bore illustrations of Persian textiles and metalwork and depicted increased cultural diversity in populated Chinese cities. Once coveted by the upper classes, ewers eventually became commonplace.

== Idiomatic usage ==
The proverb "little pitchers have big ears" cautions adults that children are not always as naïve as they seem.

== Gallery ==
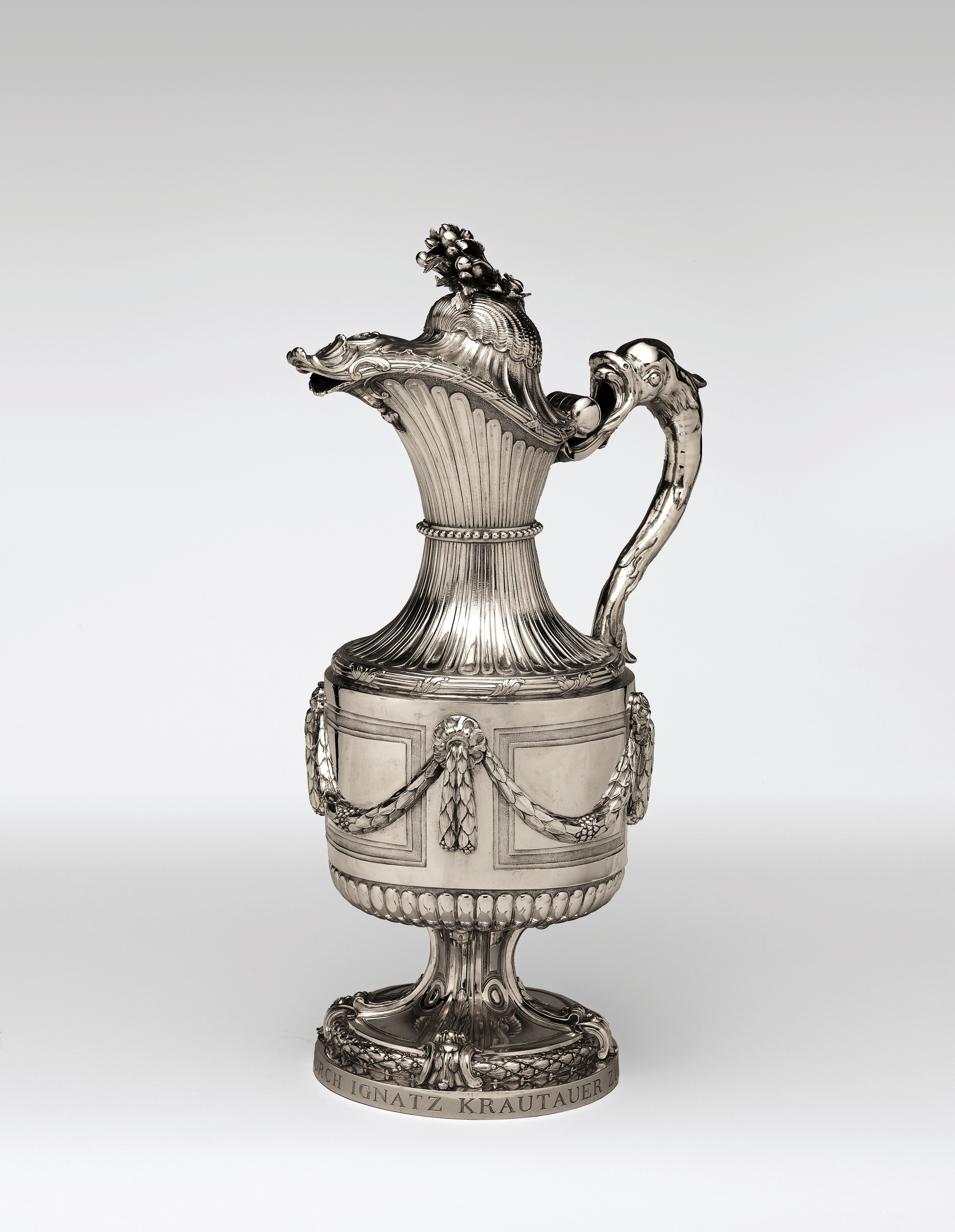
Austrian ewer, 1775, silver, height: 48 cm, Metropolitan Museum of Art.

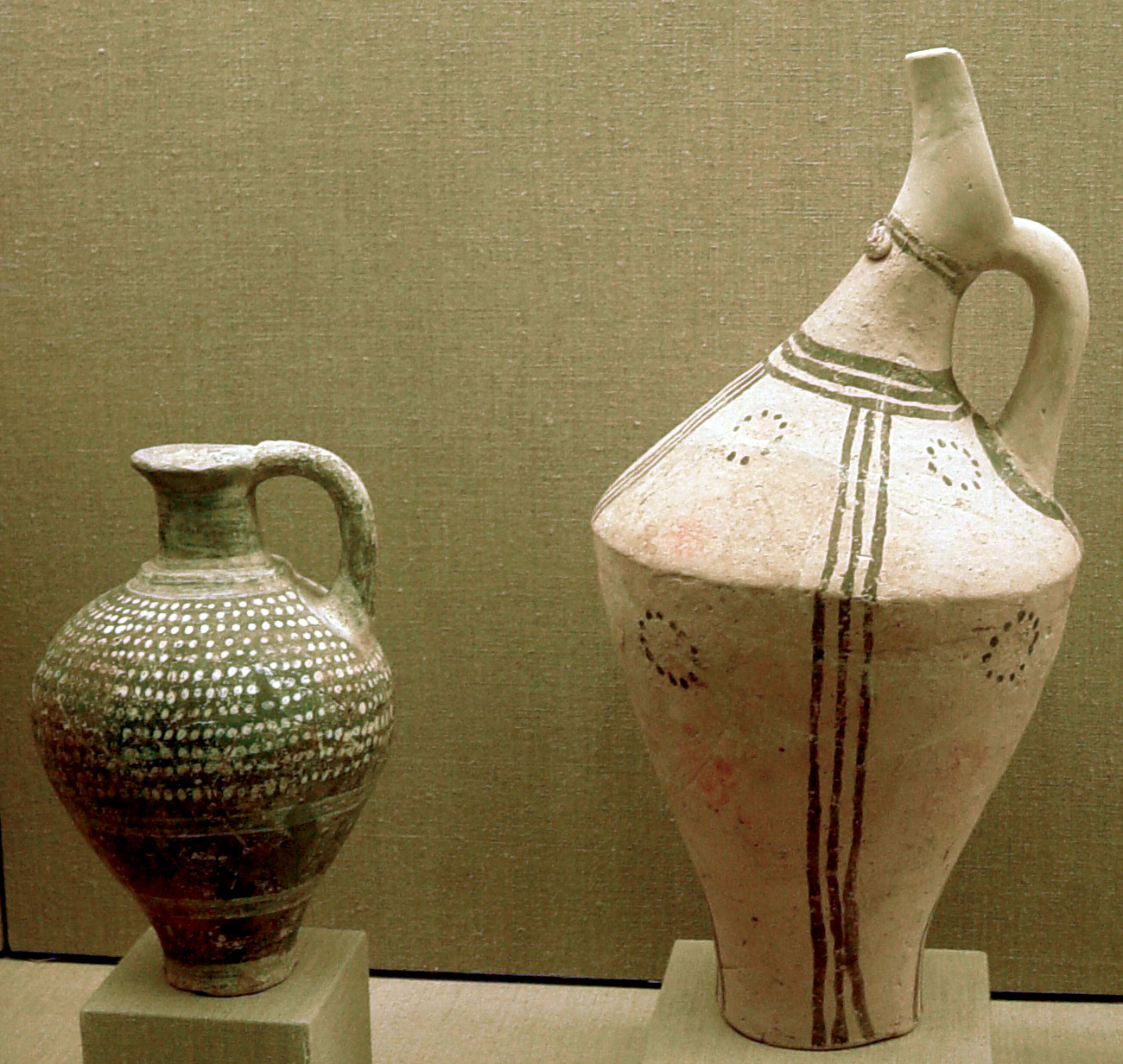
Minoan ewers, early 17th century BC, from Akrotiri (Santorini), Museum of Prehistoric Thera (Santorini, Greece).

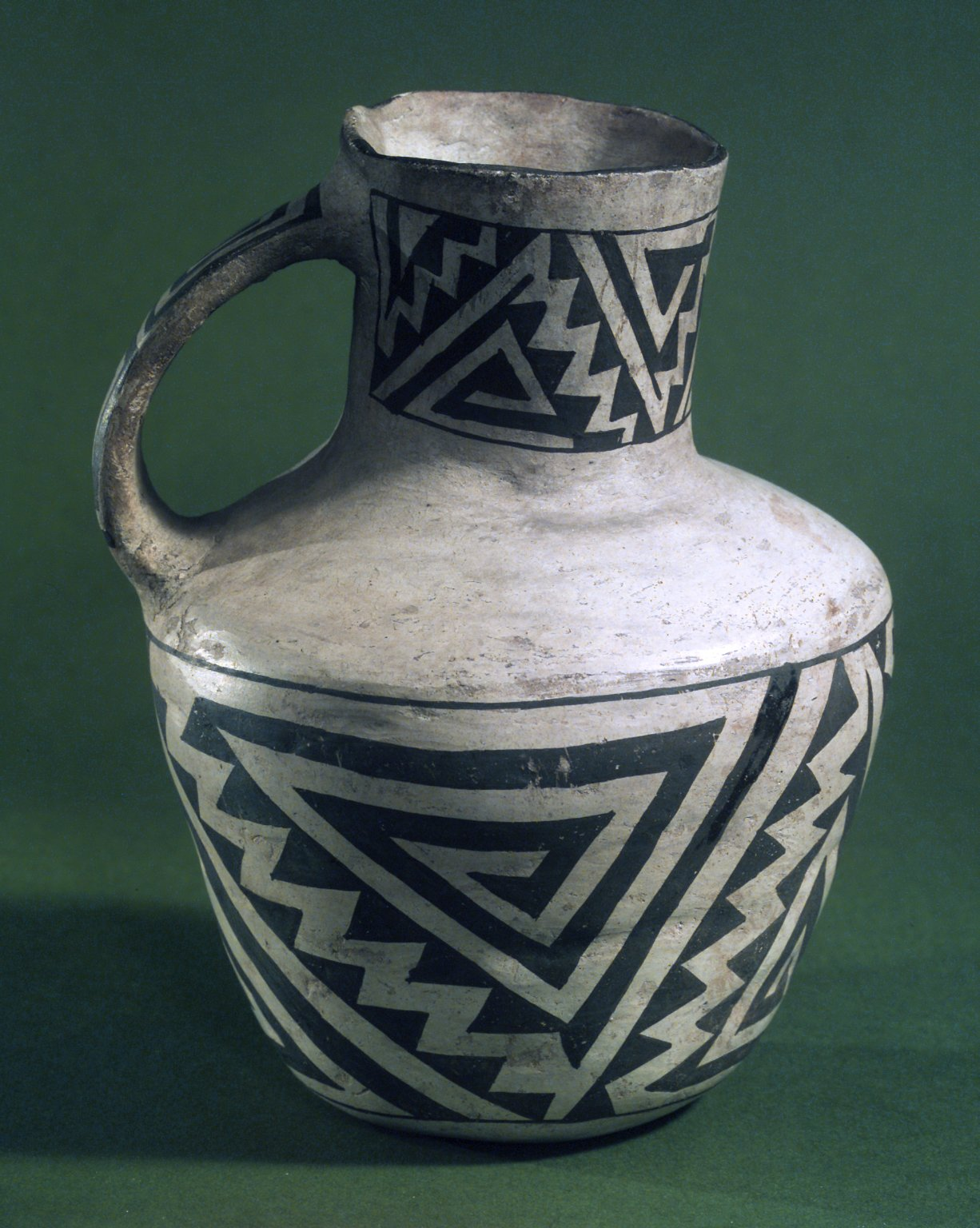
Pitcher with Black on White Geometric Designs, Anasazi (Native American), 900-1300 AD. Brooklyn Museum.

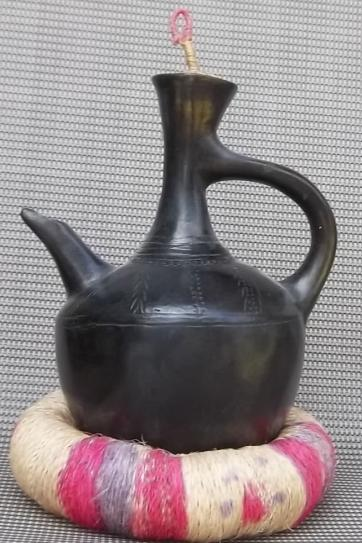
Jebena. A Jebena is the coffee pitcher used in Ethiopia and Eritrea and is a piece of pottery.

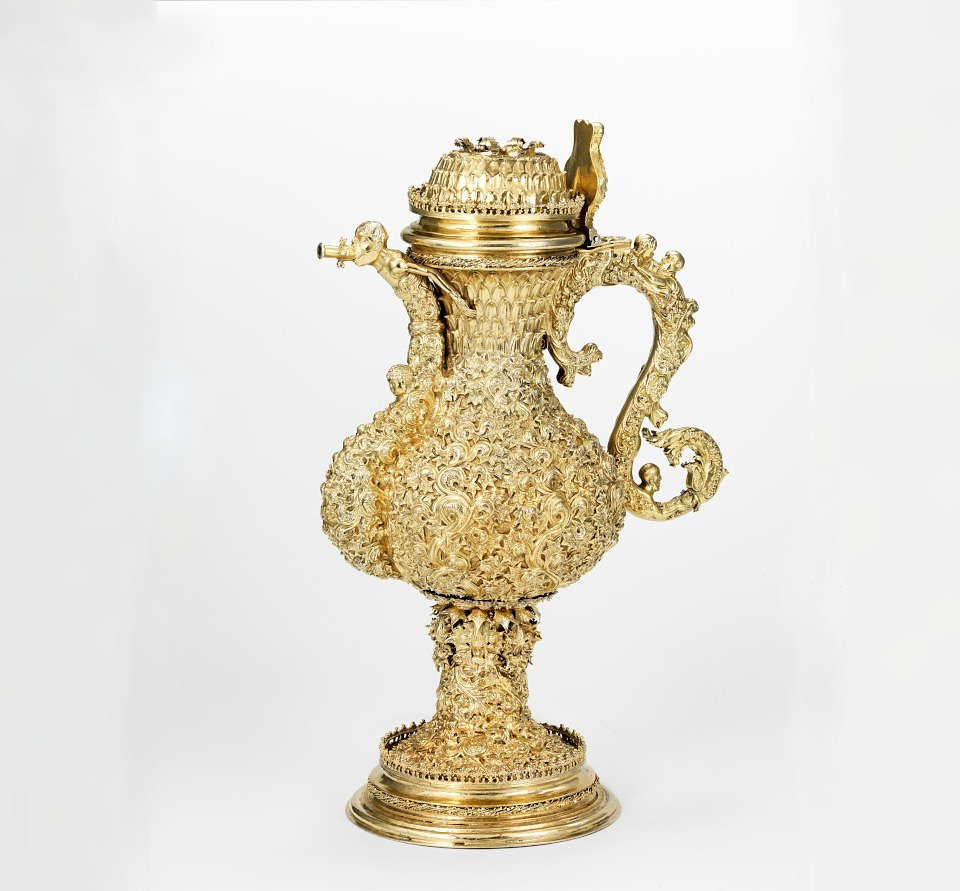
Silver-gilt pitcher from the Portuguese crown jewels collection, c. 1490-1510.

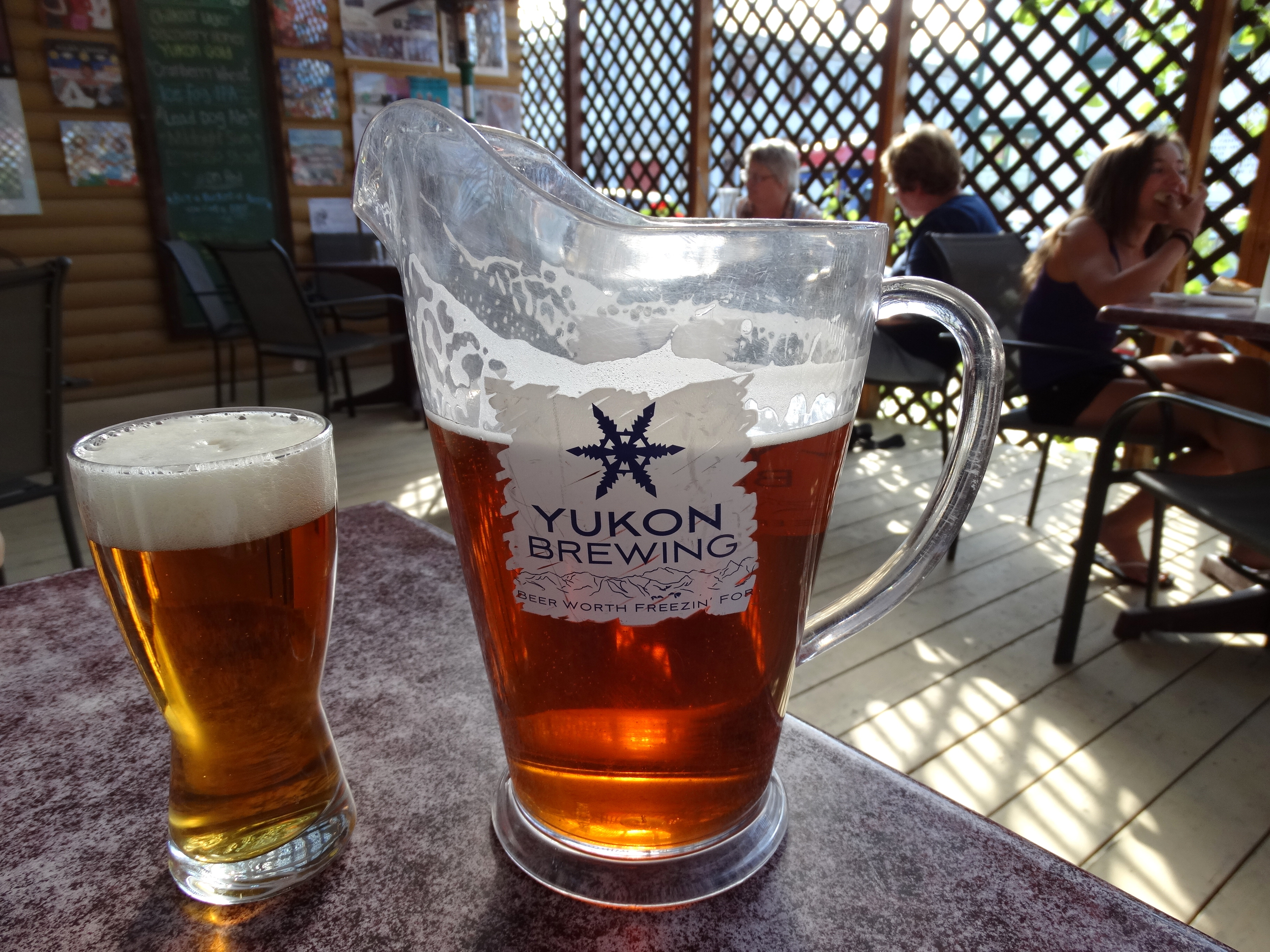
Pitcher of beer.

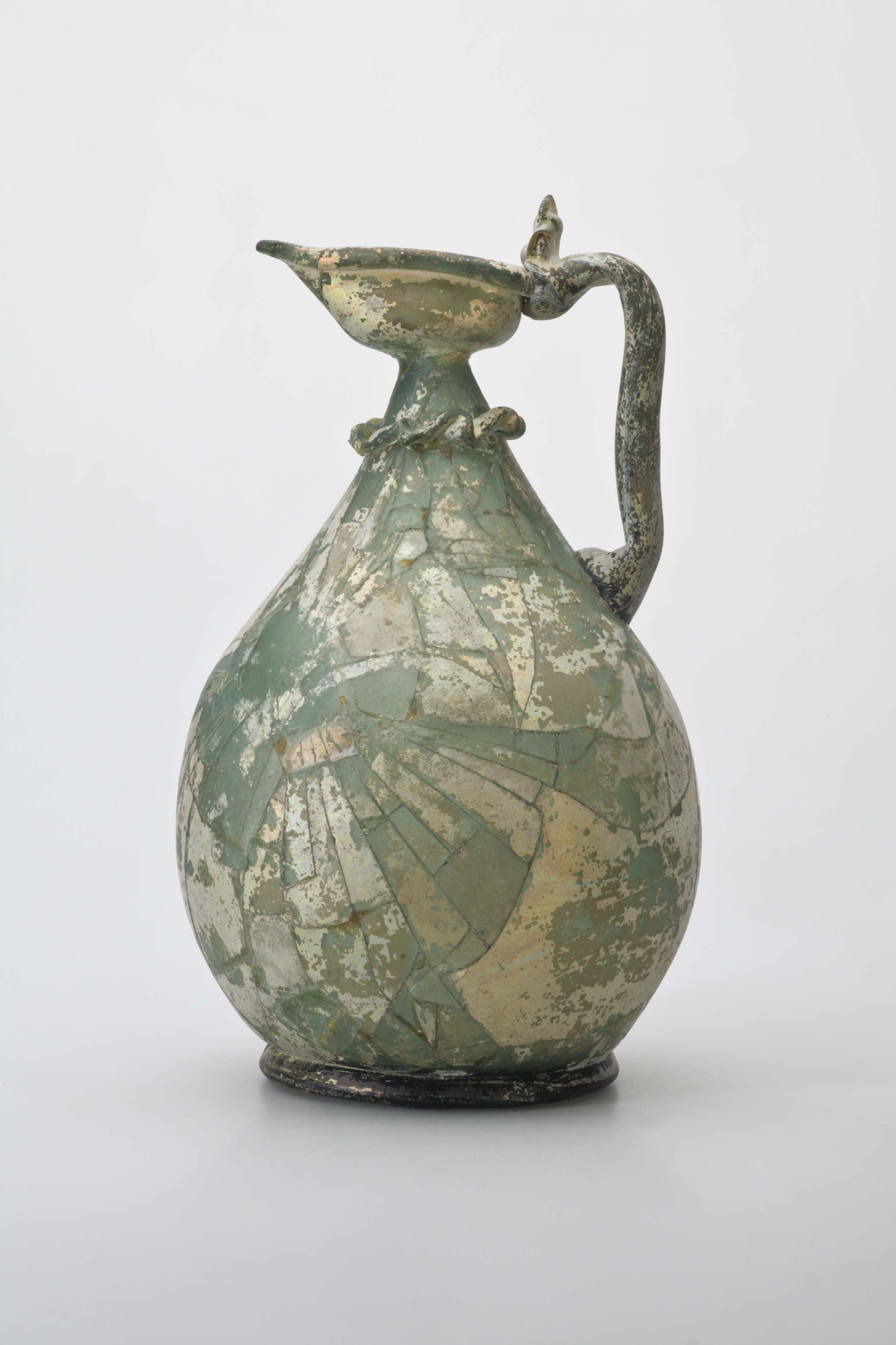
Large Ewer, Iran or Egypt 9th–11th century AD, held by the Khalili Collection of Islamic Art. This is the largest specimen known so far of a popular Islamic glass form – the pear-shaped ewer with almond-shaped mouth. The shape can be traced back to Sasanian glass ewers.

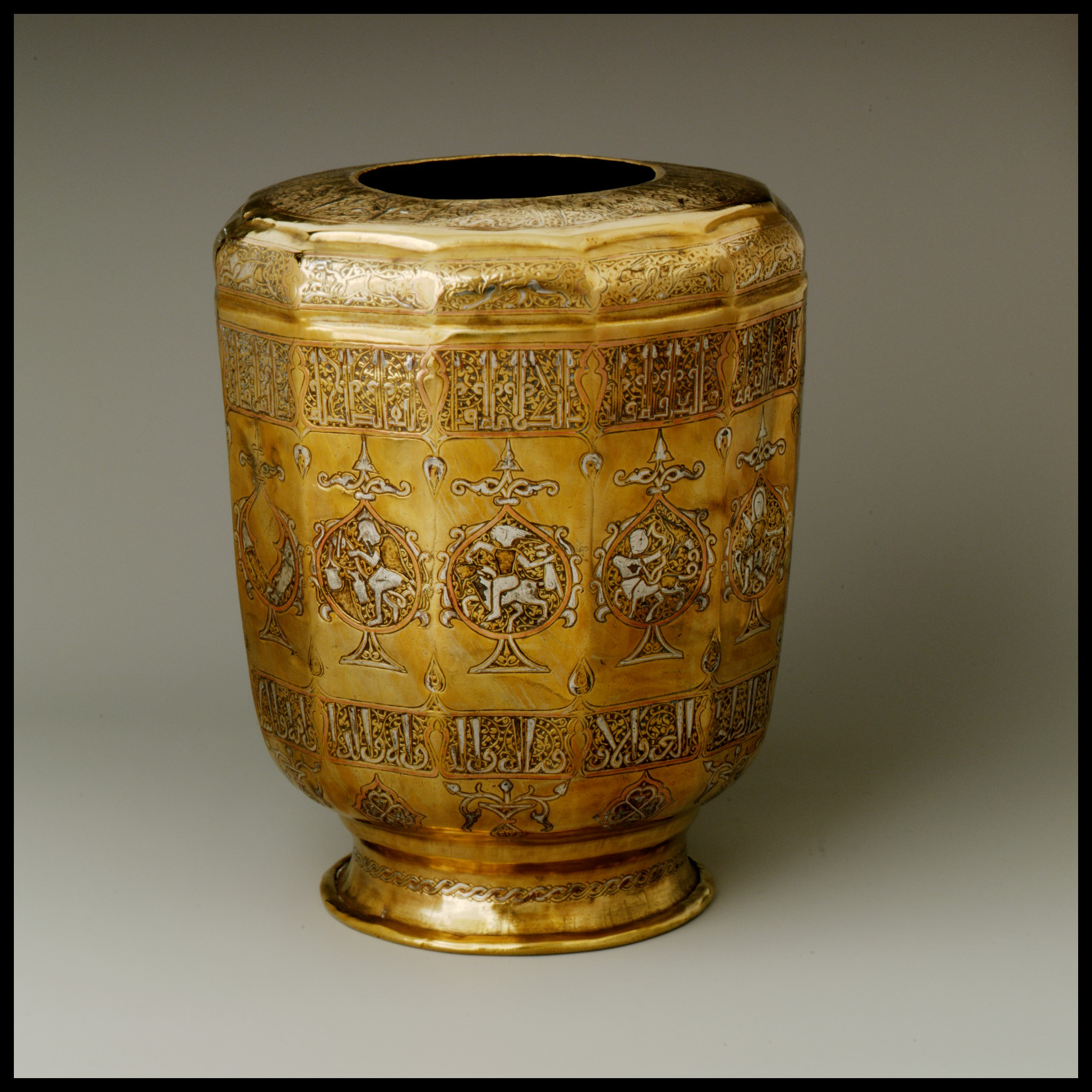
Ewer Base with Zodiac Medallions, first half of the 13th century, Iran. Metropolitan Museum of Art.

== See also ==
- Amphora
- Aquamanile
- Ashtamangala (symbolism of pitcher like object in Indian religions)
- Bridge spouted vessel
- Creamer (vessel)
- Hydria
- Jar
- Jug (container)
- Obdasta
- Oenochoe
- Pitcher plant, a group of carnivorous plants that evolved a strong resemblance to a pitcher
- Porron
