= Aftabeh =

Pitcher used for hand washing, cleansing, and ablution

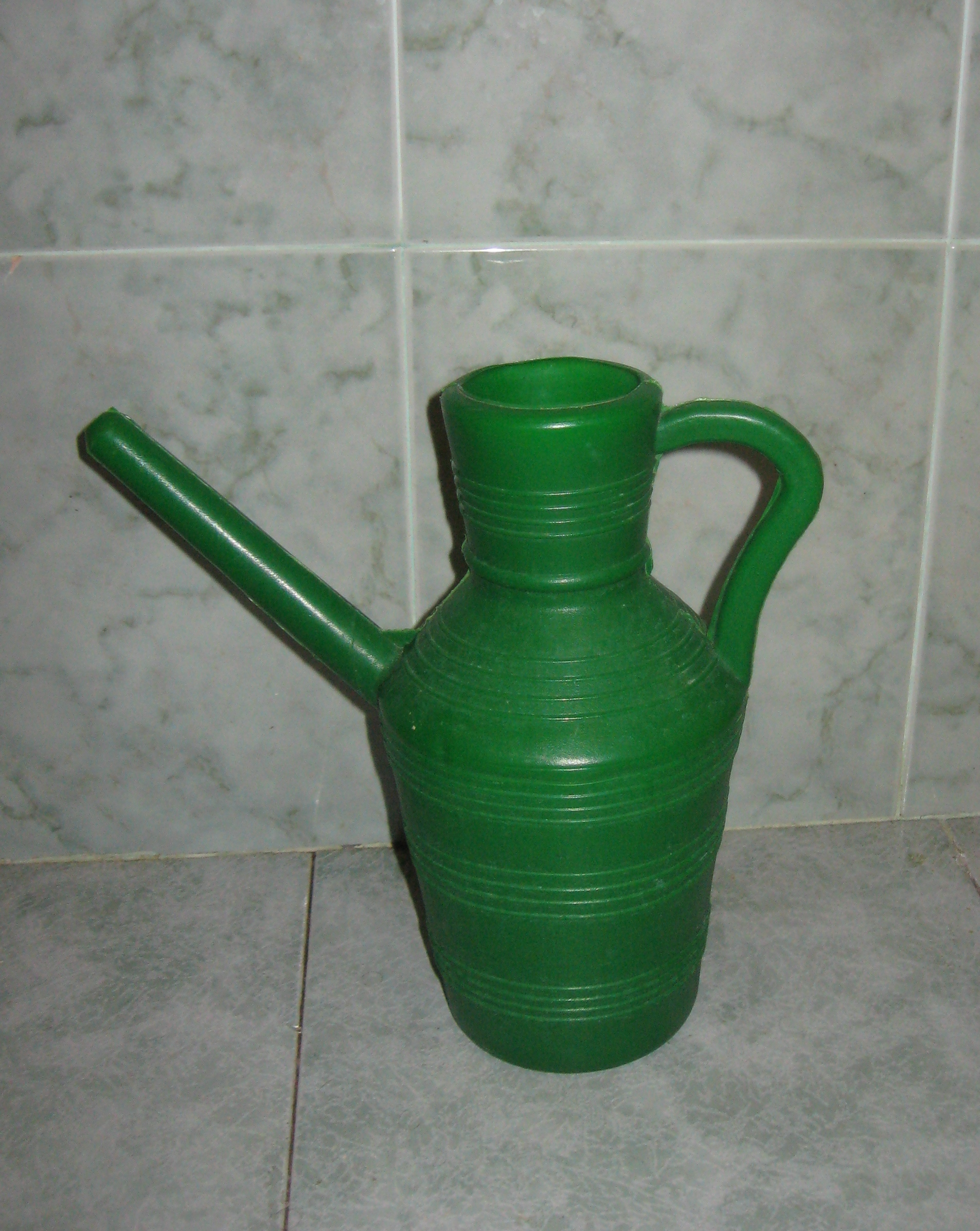
Plastic aftabeh

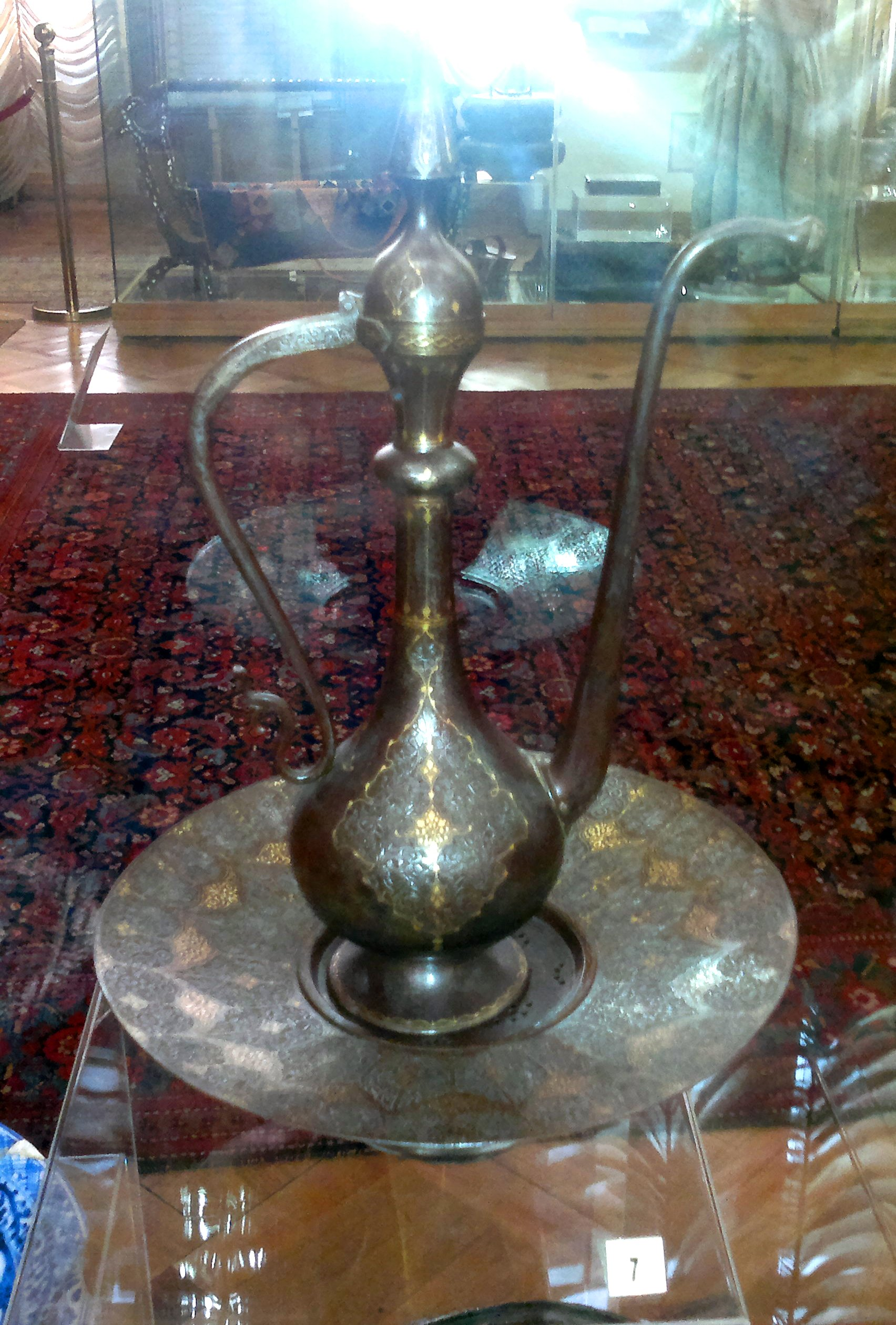
Aftabeh from the Erivan Khanate in the Museum of the History of Azerbaijan

An aftabeh (/ɑːftɑːˈbɛ/), or abtabeh (/ɑːbtɑːˈbɛ/), also called abdasta (/ɑːbdæstə/), is a pitcher made out of clay, copper, brass, or plastic, traditionally used for purposes of hand washing, cleansing, and ablution. Its overall shape is similar to a ewer with an angled spout protruding from its side, from where water is poured.

Aftabehs have been an integral part of Iran's culture for centuries, with origins tracing back to Ancient Persia. They remain widely used across the country and have historically been found in regions that were once part of Greater Iran, including Afghanistan, Azerbaijan, and parts of Central Asia. In these areas, they may also be referred to as ābdasta, āftoba, or ibriq in local dialects. In certain rural communities, an aftabeh is still offered to guests alongside a basin (lagan) and a towel for handwashing before and after meals. Aftabehs serve a similar function to other traditional cleansing vessels, such as the lota used in parts of South Asia.

Aftabeh is now primarily used as an accessory in toilets and is commonly placed alongside health faucets. Historically, many elaborately decorated aftabehs were crafted as artistic and cultural artifacts, and they are now displayed in museums around the world.

== Etymology ==
The word aftabeh (آفتابه) is derived from Persian āb (آب), meaning "water," and tābeh (تابه), meaning "vessel." While tābeh usually refers to a "pan," in this context, it carries the broader meaning of a container or vessel.

An alternative term, ābdasta (آبدسته), comes from āb (آب), meaning "water," and dasta (دسته), meaning "handle," directly referring to the handled nature of the vessel. Both terms emphasize the function of the aftabeh as a container for water used in cleansing and ablution.

== Cultural and artistic significance ==
Over time, the aftabeh has evolved beyond its purely functional use. While traditionally a household necessity, particularly for hygiene and ablution, it has also been reimagined as a decorative object. Many finely crafted aftabehs, particularly those made from brass and copper, have become collectible pieces, valued for their intricate designs and cultural significance.

In 2017, British artist David Batchelor incorporated aftabehs into his exhibition Chromatology in Iran. Using locally sourced plastic aftabehs, he created colorful chandeliers that reinterpreted the traditional object as a contemporary art piece. The installation highlighted the aftabeh’s cultural significance while exploring its aesthetic potential in modern design.

== Aftabeh-Lagan as a Persian proverb ==
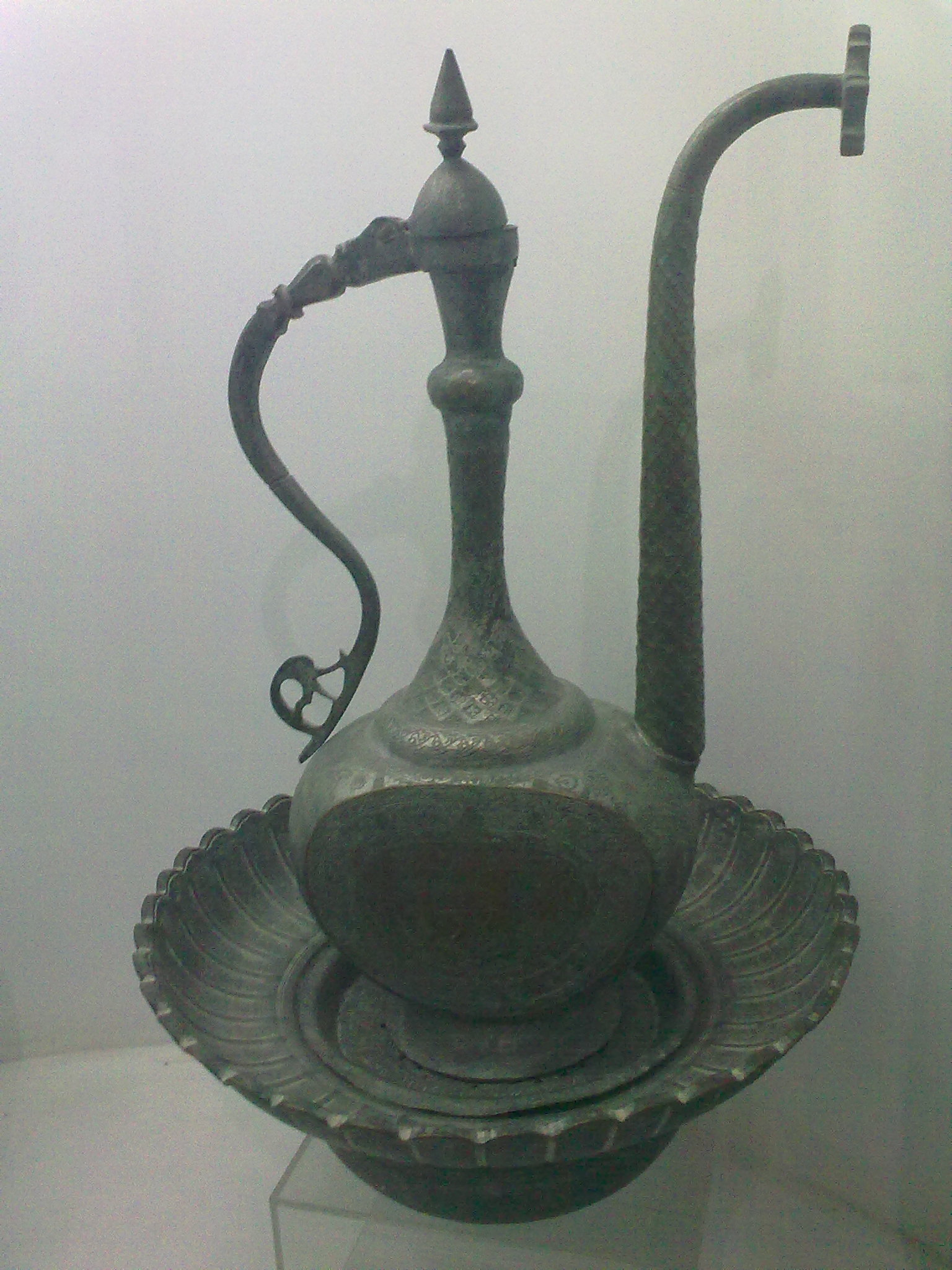
Qajar-era aftabeh-lagan from Arak

In the Qajar era, it was customary for affluent families to have servants present a set of brass or copper aftabeh-lagan (pitcher and wash basin) for guests to wash their hands and face before meals. This practice has become associated with a well-known Persian proverb:

آفتابه لگن هفت دست، ولی شام و ناهار هیچی
Âftâbeh lagan haft dast, vali shâm o nâhâr hichi
"Seven sets of aftabeh-lagan, but no lunch or dinner!"

This saying describes situations where there is an elaborate display of formality or grandeur, but lacking in actual substance or meaningful outcome.

== See also ==
- Kumgan
