= Handwashing in Judaism =

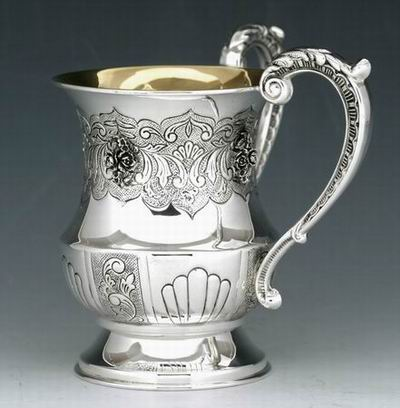
A silver cup used for hand-washing

Jewish law and custom prescribe ritual handwashing in a number of situations. This practice is generally known by the Hebrew term netilath yadayim (Hebrew: נטילת ידיים), which means 'taking up of the hands'.

The Talmud used the requirement of handwashing in Leviticus 15:11, "And whomsoever he that hath the issue toucheth, without having rinsed his hands in water, he shall wash his clothes, and bathe himself in water, and be unclean until the even", as a hint for general handwashing law, using the principle of asmakhta or 'allusion'.

== Occasions for handwashing ==
=== Before eating bread ===
Halakha requires the hands to be washed before eating a meal containing bread, which involves pouring water over both hands up to the wrists. In some places, this act is repeated twice. This washing was initially known as mayim rishonim (Hebrew: מַיִם רִאשׁוֹנִים, romanized: first waters in Berakhot 53b. Had a person eaten only 1.1 oz. of bread (an olive's bulk), he requires handwashing. However, the blessing over handwashing must be recited whenever eating at least 2.2 oz. of bread (an egg's bulk).

This only applies to bread made from one of the five chief grains (wheat, cultivated barley, spelt, wild barley, (Note: wild barley and oats: The Hebrew words used here are shippon and shibboleth shu'al, which Rashi translates in this order, "rye (Secale cereale) and oats (Avena sterilis)". The same Hebrew words are interpreted differently by Maimonides, who calls shippon "a kind of wild barley," later called by him in Arabic al-dawsar (Aegilops), and calls shibboleth shu'al in Mishnah Pesahim 2:5 "wild barley" (Hordeum spontaneum)) and oats). The washing is performed by pouring water from a cup over each hand, whether the hands were dirty or not. Most poskim require pouring water first over one's left hand, followed by pouring water over one's right hand. The water used to perform handwashing must be water that has not been used for other work, nor has the water's appearance changed in color. Each handwashing is followed by lifting-up of both hands and blessing over the handwashing, which is immediately followed thereafter by thoroughly drying the hands by wiping them with a towel. Drying off the hands is part and parcel with the ritual of washing.

The Gemarah of the Babylonian Talmud contains homiletic descriptions of the importance of the practice, including an argument that washing before meals is so important that neglecting it is equivalent to unchastity, and risks divine punishment in the form of sudden destruction or poverty.

Rabbinic law requires that travelers go as far as four biblical miles to obtain water for washing before eating bread if there is a known water source there. This applies only to when the water source lies in one's direction of travel. However, had he already passed the water source, he is only obligated to backtrack to a distance of one biblical mile. The one exception to this rule is when a man or a party of men are encamped while on a journey, and there is no water to be found in the vicinity of their camp, in which case the Sages of Israel have exempted them from washing their hands before breaking bread.

=== After eating bread (Mayim Acharonim) ===
Rabbinic sources discuss the practice of washing hands after a meal before reciting Birkat Hamazon. This practice is known as mayim acharonim ("after-waters"). According to the Talmud, the washing is motivated by health concerns, to remove the "salt of Sodom" which may have been served at the meal - as salt originating from that region allegedly causes blindness should it be on one's fingers and they happen to touch their eyes. The Talmud considered mayim acharonim obligatory, and more important that washing before the meal. Many, but not all, later sources agree; for example: Shulchan Aruch, Orach Chaim 181:1.

However, Tosafot ruled that mayim acharonim is not required in current circumstances since the salt of Sodom is no longer served at meals. Similarly, Yaakov Emden ruled that it is not required since nowadays it is customary to eat with forks and knives and salt is unlikely to get on the fingers. Based on these sources, in many communities nowadays mayim acharonim is not practiced. Nevertheless, many others continue to practice it. One reason to continue practicing it is the principle that if the underlying reason behind a rabbinic ruling no longer applies, the ruling is not automatically canceled. Another reason has given the assertion that in every kor of salt, there is to be found a qurtov of salt of Sodom.

Although mayim acharonim was once not widely practiced (for example, until recently, it did not appear in many Orthodox Passover Haggadahs), it has undergone something of a revival. It has become more widely observed in recent years, particularly for special meals such as the Shabbat and Jewish holidays.

No blessing is recited on this washing. Generally, only a small amount of water is poured over the outer two segments of the fingers, while a minority (primarily Yemenite Jews or related groups) wash the entire hand up to the wrist. The water is sometimes poured from a special ritual dispenser. One should not pause between the washing and reciting birkat hamazon.

==== Thematic interpretations ====
Abraham Isaac Kook explained that our involvement in the physical act of eating can potentially diminish our sense of holiness. To counteract this influence, we wash our hands after the meal. The Talmudic Sages spoke of washing away the "salt of Sodom" – a place whose very name symbolizes selfishness and indifference to others. "This dangerous salt, which can blind our eyes to the needs of others, is rendered harmless through the purifying ritual of mayim acharonim."

=== Before eating dipped fruit or vegetables ===
Some sources speak of washing hands before eating a piece of food dipped in a liquid (e.g., water, honey, oil, milk, wine, etc.) which then clings to that piece. While the Shulhan Arukh requires the washing of hands before eating fruits that are merely damp with one of the seven liquids, Maimonides does not mention this stringency in his Mishneh Torah. Rabbi Yosef Qafih wrote that the enactment only applied to dipping fruits or vegetables in a liquid, but not when wetness merely clung to those fruits or vegetables by rinsing. Sephardic tradition is not to make a blessing over this handwashing, while Yemenite Jewish tradition is to make a blessing over this handwashing, since 'wherever there is a custom, the rule to be lenient in cases of doubtful blessings does not apply' (Hebrew: במקום מנהג לא אומרים ספק ברכות להקל).

Nowadays this washing is not widely practiced, with one notable exception: During a Passover Seder, the hands are washed without reciting a blessing before eating karpas, a washing referred to as "Urchatz."

=== Before worship ===
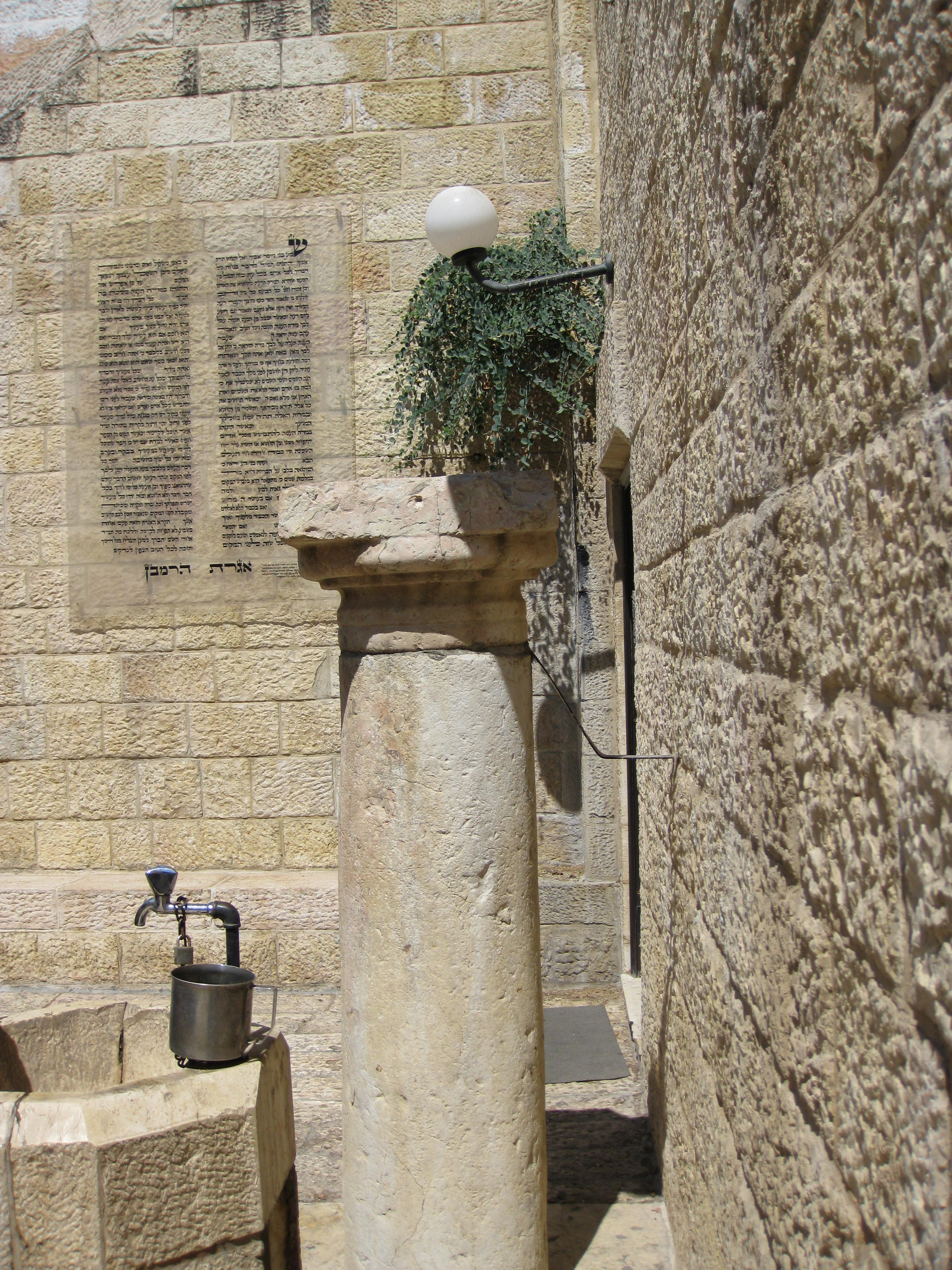
A sink for ritual hand-washing at the entrance to the Ramban Synagogue.

According to the Shulchan Aruch, a person should wash both hands before prayer. This handwashing does not require a cup (or similar vessel), though many have the custom to use a cup. No blessing is recited on this washing. If water cannot be obtained, the hands may be cleaned differently.

As the Shacharit prayer is commonly recited shortly after awakening, many Jews rely on handwashing upon awakening and do not wash their hands again before Shacharit.

This washing is likened to the ritual purification required before entering the Temple in Jerusalem, in whose absence prayer, in Orthodox Judaism, serves in its place.

=== Before the Priestly Blessing ===
In Orthodox Judaism (and, in some cases, in Conservative Judaism), Kohanim offer the Priestly Blessing before the congregation on certain occasions. Before performing their offices, they are required to wash their hands. Judaism traces this requirement to Exodus 30:19, which requires the priests to wash their hands before Temple service. The verse also refers to the washing of the feet, which is generally not practiced without a Temple in Jerusalem.

The water for this washing is commonly poured on the priests' hands by Levites, priests who assist Kohanim in other ways.

In some communities, priests do not wash their hands before the Priestly Blessing because they have already washed their hands upon awakening before the prayer.

=== After sleeping ===
According to the Shulchan Aruch, a person who has slept is required to wash upon arising, and says the netilat yadayim blessing. This ritual is known by the term Yiddish: נעגל וואַסער, romanized: negl vaser, lit. 'nail water', and in Hebrew as netilat yadayim shacharit. The Yiddish term is also used for a special cup for washing. The water is poured out from a vessel three times, intermittently, over each hand. Most poskim require pouring water first over one's right hand, followed by the left hand, which order differs from the handwashing done for eating bread, where it is customary to begin with one's left hand.

Reasons given for this washing vary: to remove an evil spirit from one's fingers, or in preparation for the morning prayer, or to make the hands physically clean before reciting blessings and studying Torah. This is performed when waking from a full night's sleep, or even after a lengthy nap.

The Talmud states God commanded Jews to wash their hands and provides the text of the netilat yadaim blessing still in use.

=== Other occasions ===
- After touching part of the body which is dirty or customarily covered such as the private parts, back, arm pits, inside of nose or ear, the scalp (but not if one just touched the hair), or the sweat from one's body (excluding the face), or one's shoes
- Upon leaving a latrine, lavatory or bathhouse, as a symbol of both bodily cleanliness and of removing human impurity. Handwashing after excretion is sometimes referred to as "washing asher yatzar," referring to the blessing recited once the hands have been washed after excretion.
- Upon leaving a cemetery
- After cutting one's hair or nails
- After a blood letting; while blood letting is no longer performed, some wash their hands after donating blood.
- To remove corpse uncleanness after participating in a funeral procession or coming within four cubits of a corpse
- Some have the custom of washing their hands before scribal work

== Laws of washing ==
Yemenite-Israeli boy rubs his hands after washing them (1949)

=== Blessing said before washing ===
A blessing is recited over handwashing before eating bread and upon waking in the morning. Maimonides prescribes saying the blessing before one actually pours water over his hands, as brought down in Orach Chayim 25.8 and Sukkah 39a and in Pesachim 7b, requiring that for all of the commandments the recitation of the blessing must be made prior. For some, the custom has developed to recite the blessing only after he has poured water over his hands and rubbed them together while they are raised in the air to the height of their chin before drying them with a towel. (Note: Compare responsum of Hai ben Sherira quoted in Sefer Shaarei Teshuvah - 353 Geonic Responsa,)

The blessing text is as follows: "Blessed are you, O Lord, our God, King of the Universe, who has sanctified us through your commandments and has commanded us concerning the washing of hands" (Hebrew: בָּרוּךְ אַתָּה הָ׳ אֱלֹהֵינוּ מֶלֶךְ הָעוֹלָם אֲשֶׁר קִדְּשָׁנוּ בְּמִצְוֹתָיו וְצִוָּנוּ עַל נְטִילַת יָדַיִם, romanized: Bāruḵ ʾattā Adonāy ʾElōhēnu meleḵ hāʿolām ʾašer qiddəšānu bəmiṣwoṯāw wəṣiwwānu ʿal nəṭilaṯ yād̲ayim). Immediately after reciting the blessing, one must dry the hands with a towel or similar.

A text from the Cairo Geniza, following the Palestinian minhag, has been discovered where the blessing concluded על מצות שטיפת ידים ʿal šəṭip̄aṯ yād̲ayim.

=== Manner of pouring the water ===
In two handwashings, water is poured out over one's hands with the aid of a vessel: 1) upon waking from sleep and 2) before eating bread. These handwashings are nearly always accompanied by a special blessing before concluding the actual act of washing (see supra). The basis of references in the Bible to this practice, e. g., Elisha pouring water upon the hands of Elijah. Water should be poured on each hand at least twice. A clean, dry substance should be used instead if water is unavailable. Other instances of handwashing may be done with running water from a faucet.

Other methods have developed concerning over which hand one is to begin when pouring water over them. The general custom in the morning, based on Kabbalah, is to take up the vessel in one's right hand, pass it into the left hand, and only then begin to pour out water from that vessel over his right hand. Then one reverses the order by taking-up the vessel in his right hand and pouring out water from that vessel over his left hand. This process is repeated three times for each hand, with intermittent changing of hands after each pouring. When this is accomplished, he then takes the vessel and pours out water over both hands simultaneously, after which he rubs his hands together and then lifts them to make the blessing over his hands before he wipes them dry.

The handwashing custom for eating bread differs: One takes the vessel in his right hand and pours water in abundance over his left hand. He then takes the vessel in his left hand and pours abundant water over his right hand. In this case (for eating bread), it is not necessary to wash the hands three times, intermittently, as is customarily done in the morning. Instead, one or two pours for each hand are sufficient.

=== Quantity and type of water ===
Although the minimal quantity of water needed to fulfill one's religious duty is 1/4 of a log (a liquid measure of capacity equal to the bulk or volume of one and half medium-sized eggs), and must be sufficient to cover at least the middle joints of one's fingers, water poured out more than this amount is considered praiseworthy in Jewish law.

The water must be naturally pure, unused, not contain other substances, and not discoloured.

== Development of handwashing on bread ==
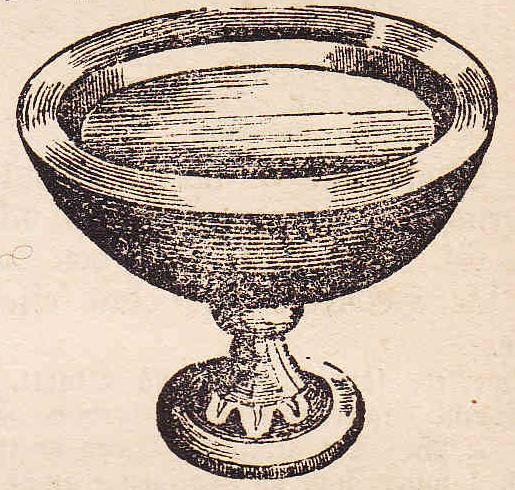
1890 illustration of laver in the Temple

The most developed of these washings is washing hands before eating bread. It is looked upon with rigidity. Those who willfully neglect its practice are said to make themselves liable to excommunication, and bring upon themselves a state of scarcity, and are quickly taken out of the world.

=== Handwashing in the Temple ===
Exodus 30:17–20 requires the kohanim (priests) to wash their hands and feet before offering korban or entering the Tabernacle. Solomon's Temple contained ten brazen lavers to allow for this washing. The Mishnah records that priests were also required to wash hands and feet after urinating. The use of these lavers did not pertain to the general public, nor their eating foods with washed hands.

The Mishnah, tractate Yadayim, is the first to describe the ritual of handwashing outside of the Temple.

According to the Babylonian Talmud, Solomon issued an additional decree requiring kohanim to wash their hands before eating meat from the qorbanot.

=== Handwashing for priests before eating terumah ===
Following the example of Solomon, the Houses of Hillel and Shammai in the 1st or 2nd century decreed the priests' hands to be ritually impure, which disqualified their eating the terumah until washing, as it may only be eaten while pure. This law was one of the eighteen enactments made in the house of Hananiah ben Hezekiah ben Garon. It is recorded in Mishnah Bikkurim 2:1, which states that terumah and bikkurim "require the washing of the hands."

Halacha specifies a number of different levels of impurity; each level can result from touch by an object at one higher level. By this handwashing degree, all human hands automatically have second-level impurity (sheni letumah) until washed, a level which is sufficient to invalidate terumah. A person's entire body cannot contract second-level impurity; only (by rabbinic law) the hands can contract second-level impurity, either by touching a first-level impurity, or by experiencing hesech hadaat (distraction) renders the hands impure again, as they might have touched a dirty or impure object without the person noticing. This impurity can be removed by handwashing.

According to the Babylonian Talmud, the reason for the decree is that "hands are busy" (i.e., fidgety) and tend to touch objects, becoming dirty. It is inappropriate for holy food to be touched by dirty hands. By declaring impurity on hands that might have become dirty, the decree ensured that the terumah would be eaten with clean hands.

The Babylonian Talmud debates whether this decree was enacted by the Houses of Hillel and Shammai, or else by Hillel and Shammai themselves (in the year circa 32 BCE). It concludes that Hillel and Shammai issued the decree but this was not commonly accepted; and later, the Houses of Hillel and Shammai reissued the degree and it was accepted.

The Jerusalem Talmud states that Hillel and Shammai did not originate the practice of washing before eating terumah; rather, the requirement had existed in ancient times and was neglected and forgotten until Hillel and Shammai revived it. While the law is of rabbinic origin, according to one opinion there is a hint (asmakhta אסמכתא) to it in Leviticus 15:11.

=== Handwashing for all Israelites ===
In subsequent years, many priests ignored the requirement to wash hands before touching terumah. To encourage the performance of this law, it was decreed that all Jews (priests and non-priests) must wash their hands before eating bread, even if that bread to be eaten was only ordinary non-terumah bread. This handwashing is referred to as serekh terumah 'habit of terumah' (סֶרֶךְ תְּרוּמָה); as all Jews were now required to wash their hands before eating bread, it was expected that the delinquent priests too would wash their hands before eating terumah (Note: Jerusalem Talmud, Hagigah 13a (2:5) "Did they not decree [defilement] over the hands in order that he (i.e. the priest) might separate himself from the terumah? By saying to a man that his hands suffer a second-grade uncleanness, even so does he (the priest) separate himself from terumah.")

The Talmud states that one must wash hands for two reasons, one being serekh terumah, and the other being "the commandment". This last phrase is unclear; according to one opinion in the Talmud, it simply refers to the commandment to obey the sages after they instituted the handwashing requirement. Other interpretations suggest an independent second reason for handwashing, such as to promote cleanliness. (Note: Tosafot, Chullin 106a; see also Netziv, Leviticus 15:11 which appears to link handwashing to the possibility of a dirty hand transferring ritually impure bodily fluids.)

=== External sources ===
What regulations were already in place during the late Second Temple period is unclear. A reference to handwashing is made in the Christian New Testament, when the Pharisees asked Jesus why his disciples did not wash their hands before eating bread. It is reported that "the Pharisees and all the Jews" considered this washing a "tradition of the elders", originally thought to be a mere stringent practice, whereby the Pharisees would eat their common bread under the same rigid conditions associated with hallowed things, and requiring a handwashing. Jesus, however, and the disciples did not do it - even though one proclaimed to be the Messiah might be expected to follow the highest standards for holy behavior. Thus, the disciples' non-observance may indicate that handwashing before bread was not universal at the time. Perhaps handwashing was practised by some Pharisaic schools of thought and not others (for example, by the School of Shammai and not the more lenient School of Hillel).

In other sources it is implied that Jewish scholars were scrupulous to wash their hands frequently, as it was considered a form of Jewish etiquette.
