= Bidet shower =

Hand-held triggered nozzle

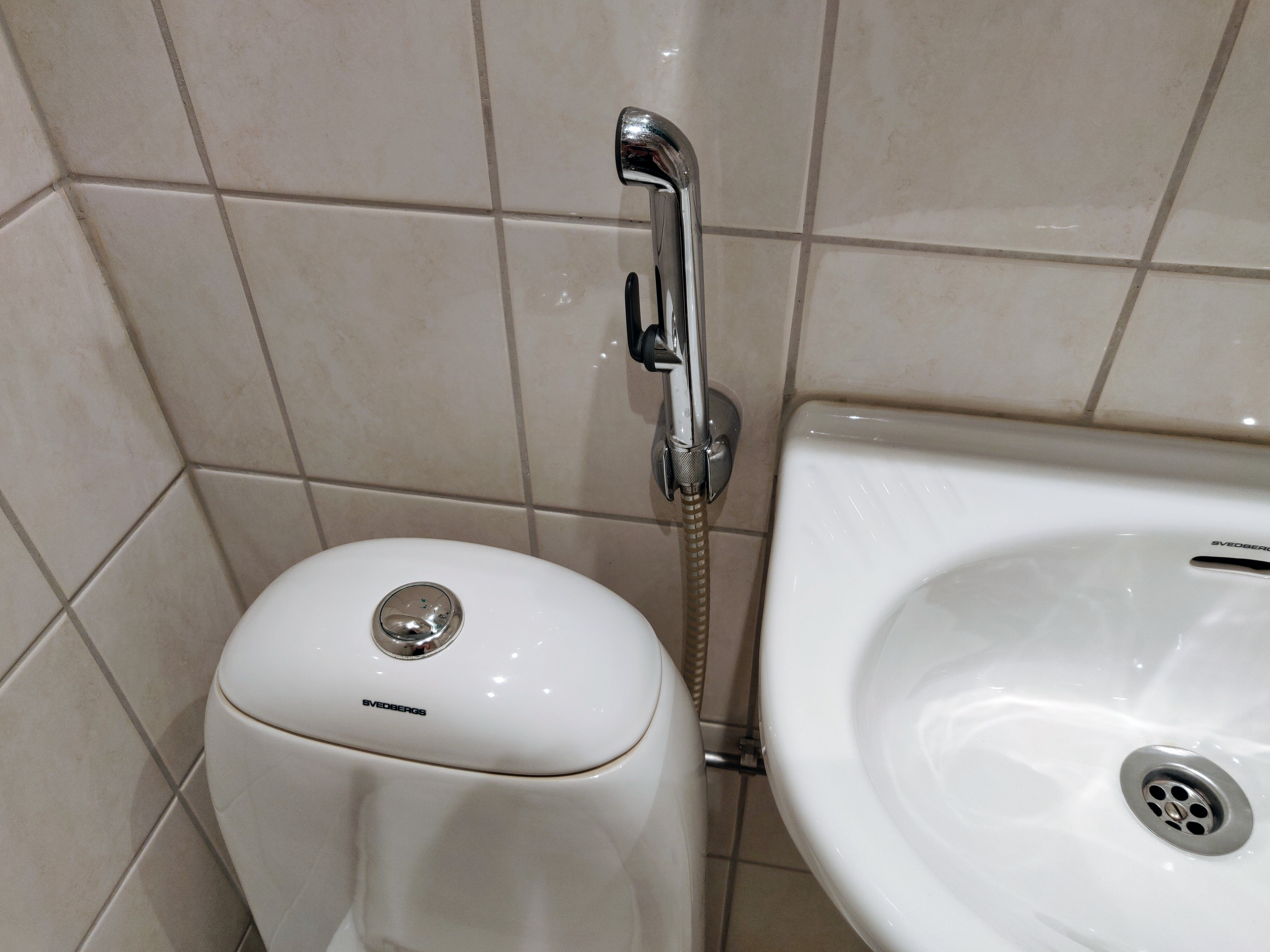
A bidet shower in a hotel bathroom in Helsinki, Finland

A bidet shower is a hand-held triggered nozzle that is placed near the toilet and delivers a spray of water used for anal cleansing and cleaning of the genitals after using the toilet for defecation and urination. The device is similar to that of a kitchen sink sprayer.

It is also known as a handheld bidet, commode shower, toilet shower, health faucet, bum shower, bidet spray, jet spray, hand shower, shattaf (from the Arabic: شَطَّافَة, romanized: shaṭafa [ʃɑtˤˈtˤɑːfɑ], "hand shower rinser"), Muslim shower (common in Pakistan), or bum gun.

In predominantly Muslim countries, but also the Catholic world, the Eastern Orthodox, and some Protestant countries such as Finland and Estonia, water is usually used for anal cleansing, using a jet (bidet shower, bidet) or vessel.

== History ==
In 1968, the Finnish company Oras invented a bidet shower called "Bidetta". It quickly became a standard in Finnish bathrooms. The company continued to develop its invention and in 1979 patented it in the form in which the hygienic shower is familiar to us today.

In the early 1990s, Rizwan Sajan and Anis Sajan based in Dubai founded the company Danube Group and began selling handheld bidet showers called Shattaf. It soon became widespread across much of the Arab world and Asia.

== Description ==
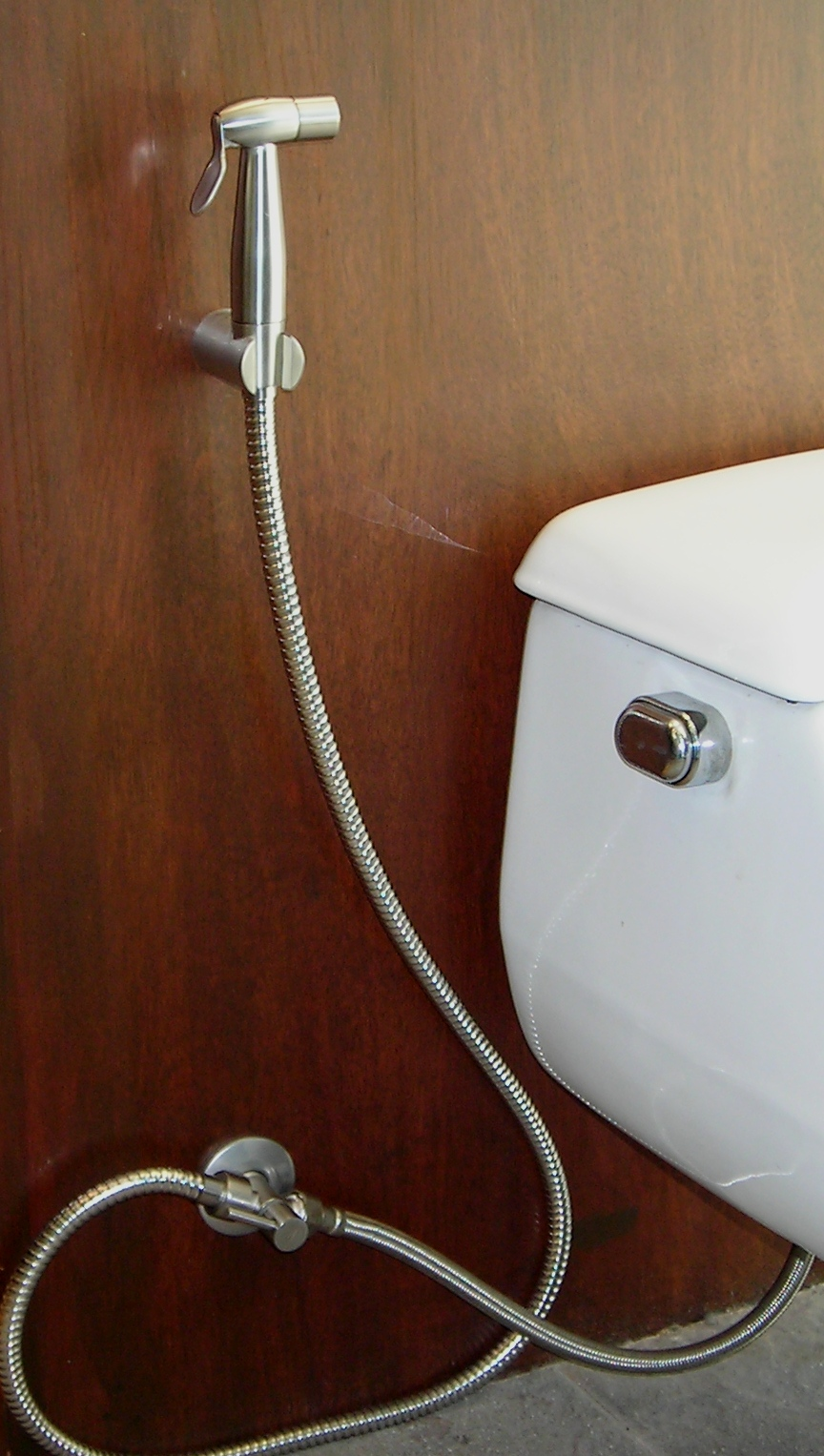
Hand-held bidet sprayer

The shower is a source of water for people who prefer using water rather than other methods of cleansing after defecation or urination. The shower is an alternative for the traditional sources of water for this action, such as the bidet, copper pot or bucket and mug, being more hygienic and compact. There is no contact between the spray of water and the used water drainage.

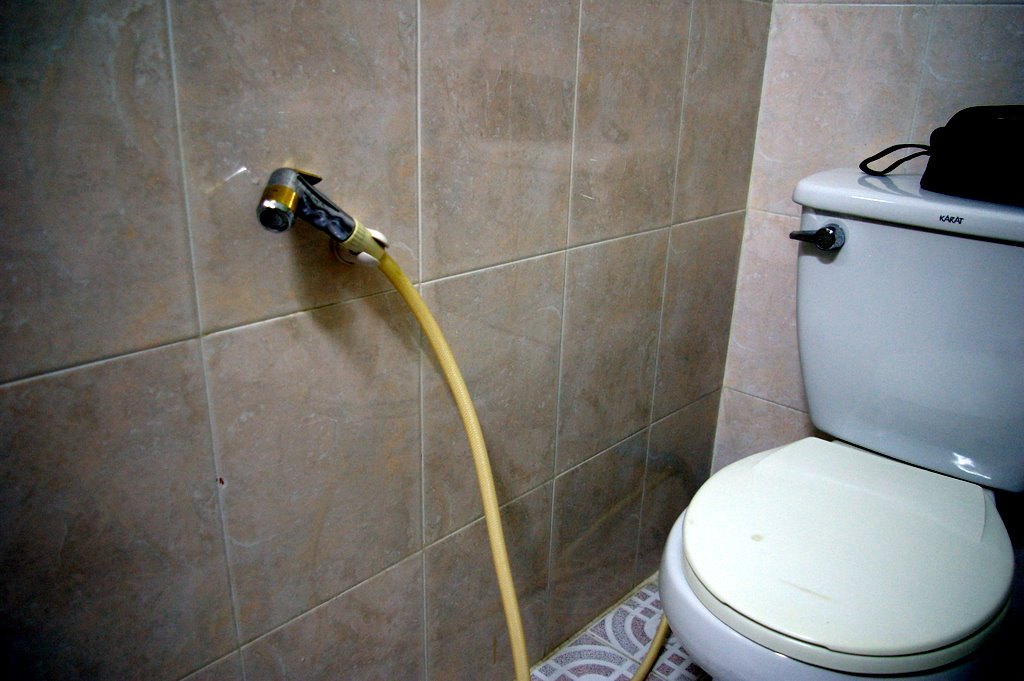
Typical faucet installation

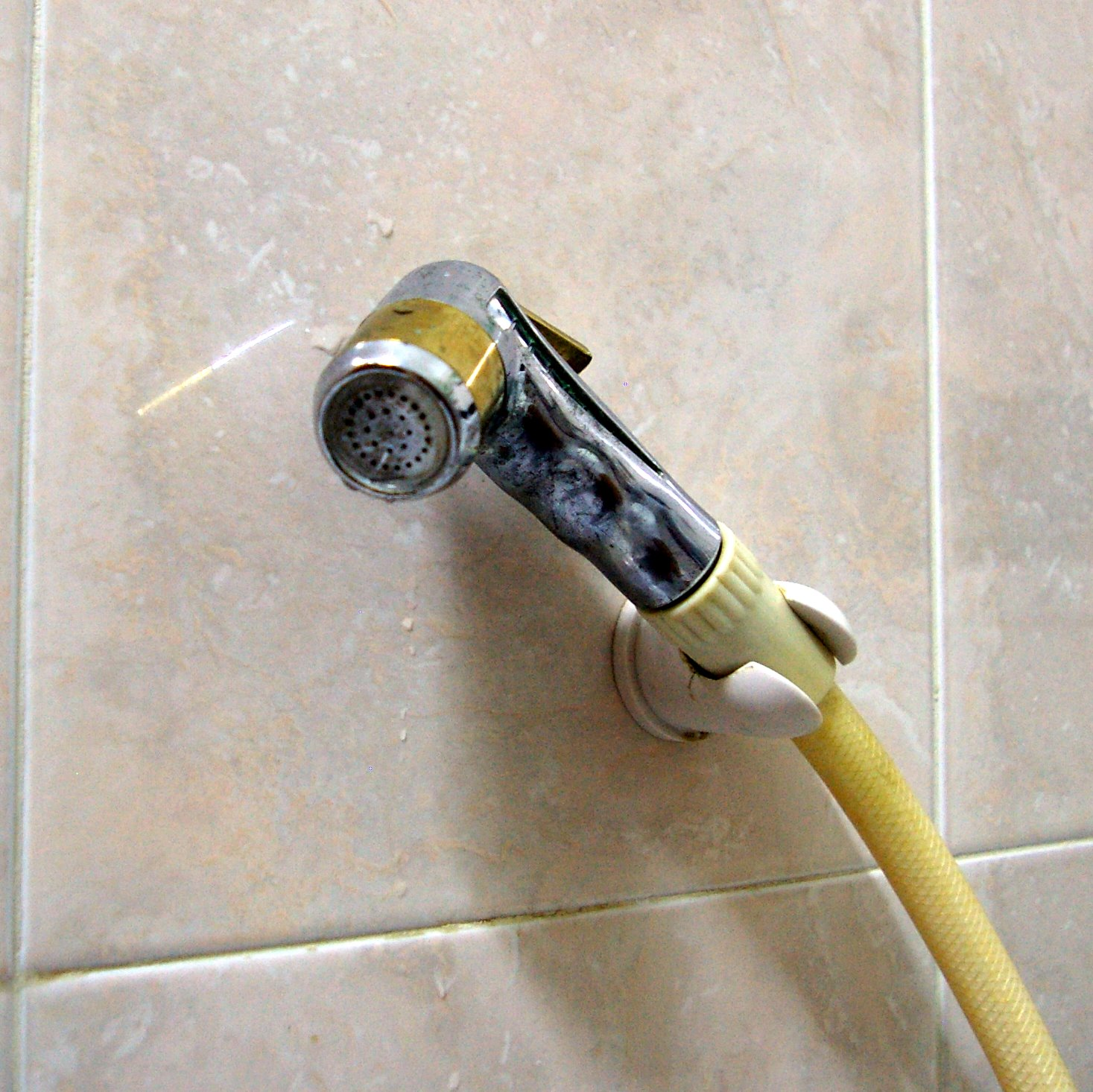
Faucet close up

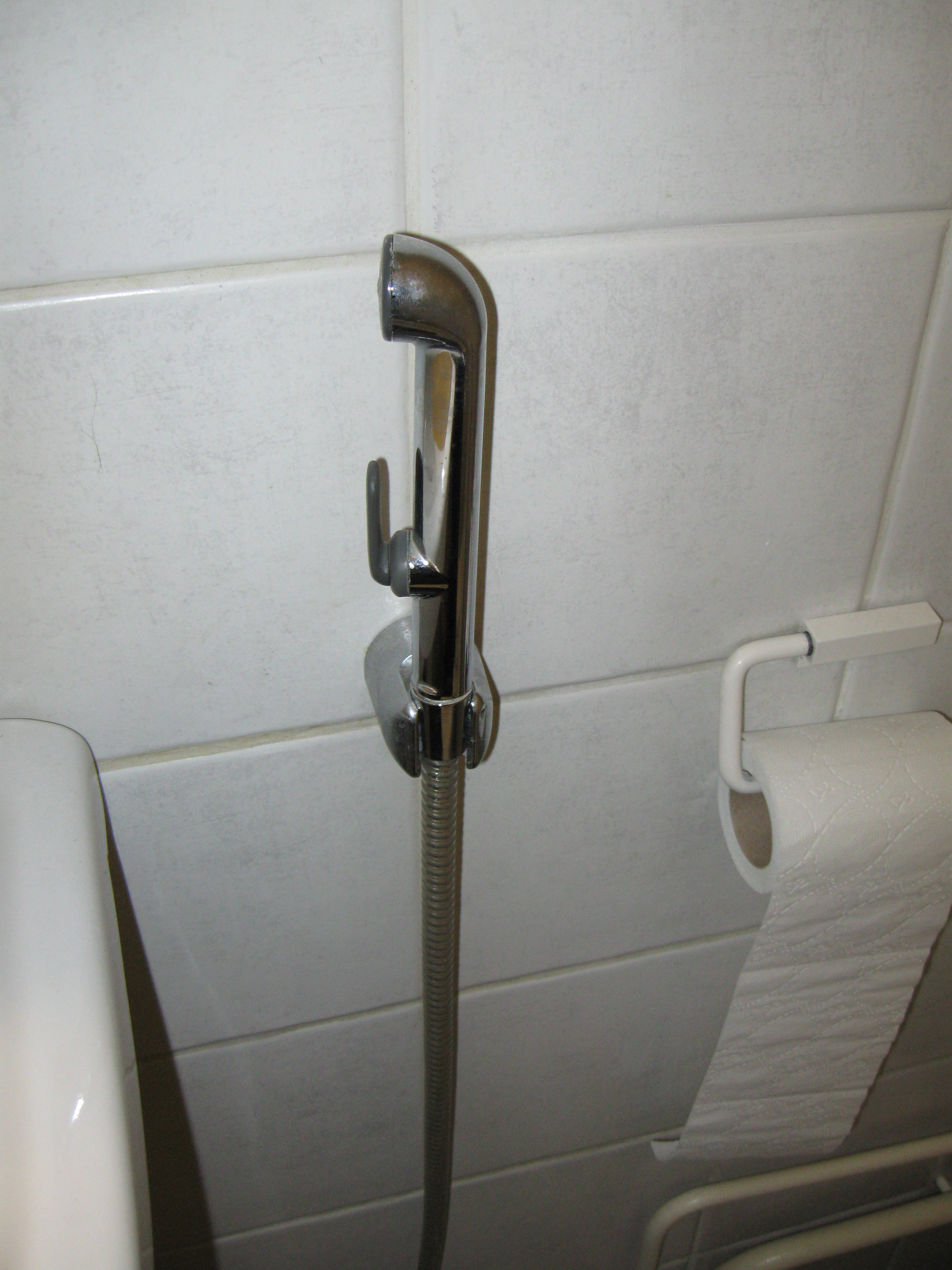
A Finnish model, manufactured by Oras

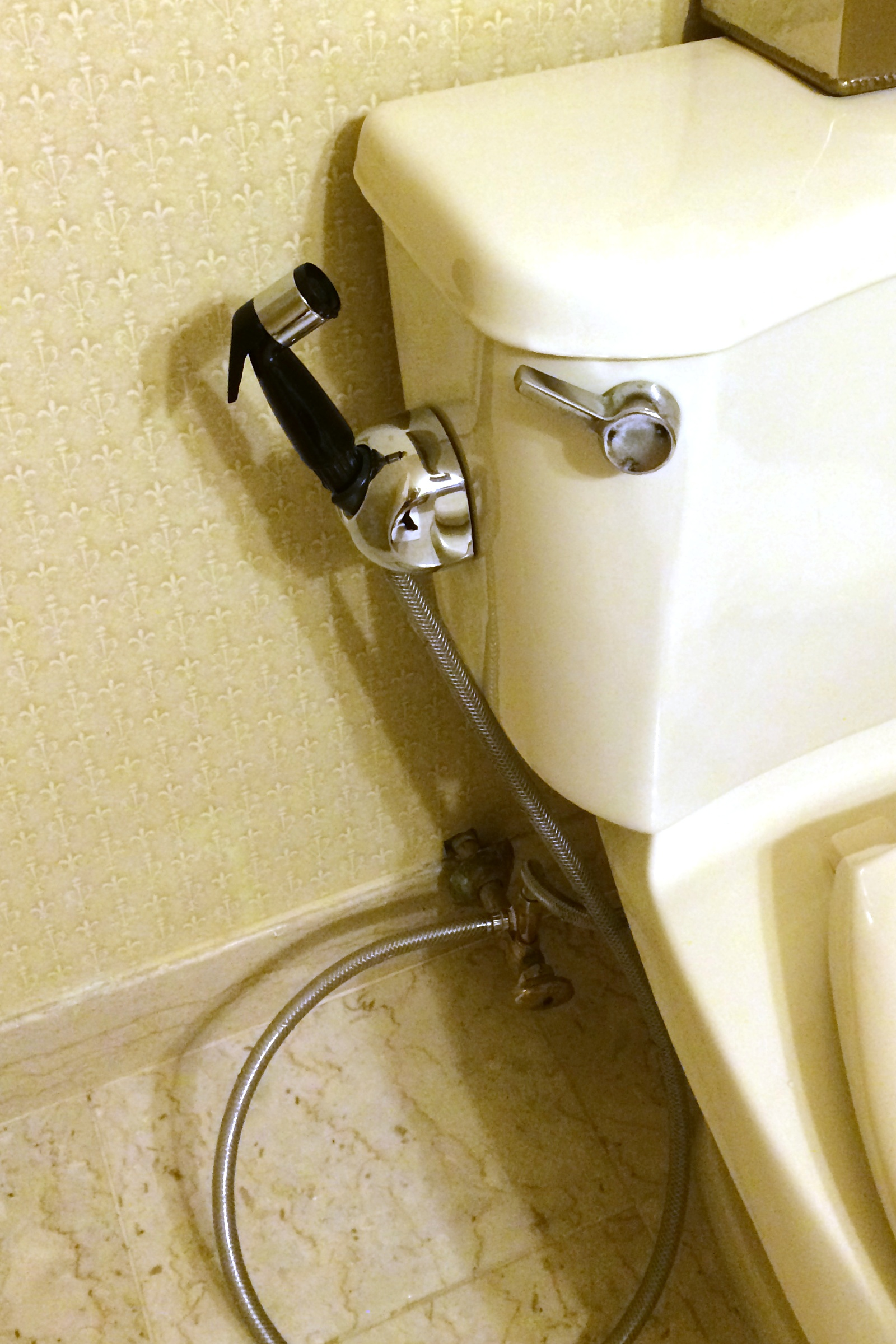
A bidet shower at the Waldorf Astoria New York

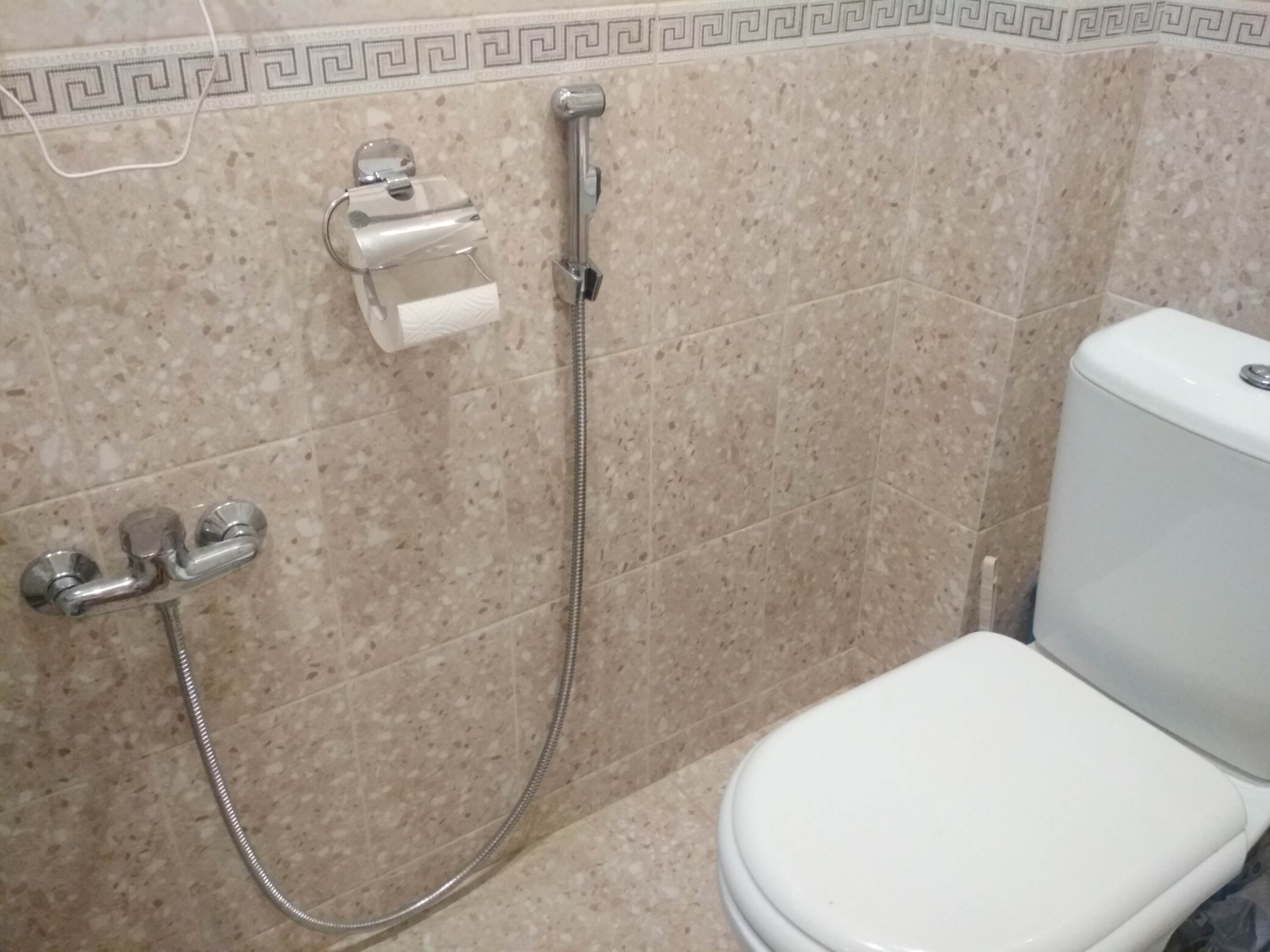
Setup with dedicated mixing faucet

== Usage ==
The user aims the faucet and sprays water at the anus or genitals to assist in cleansing after using the toilet. Toilet paper may be used to clean and dry, or a towel can be used to dry. The bidet shower can also be disinfected using disinfectant wipes, disinfectant spray, or other means after use.

== Prevalence ==
The hand shower, or bidet shower, is now common in the Middle East, South Asia, Southeast Asia, South America, North Africa, etc., where water is considered essential for anal cleansing. This includes Algeria, Bangladesh, Brazil, Cambodia, Egypt, India, Indonesia, Iran, Iraq, Libya, Malaysia, Maldives, Morocco, Nepal, Pakistan, Philippines, Singapore, Saudi Arabia, Sri Lanka, Thailand, United Arab Emirates, Vietnam etc. In some of these countries, it is commonly installed in Western-style (sitting) toilet installations. In Pakistan, India, Thailand, and the Arabian Peninsula it is common in both Western-style toilets and squat toilet installations. It is so ubiquitous that Thai parliamentarians were outraged upon learning that the toilets in their new parliament building were not equipped with bidet showers (Thai: สายฉีดชำระ, săai chìit cham-rá). The bidet shower is similar in intent, if not method of use, to the Japanese washlet-style toilet seats, or electronic bidets.

Bidet showers are used by Muslims in Muslim countries and all parts of the Arab world as well as in Asia in order to cleanse themselves with water after using the toilet, as a part of Islamic toilet etiquette. Here, water is commonly used instead of, or together with, toilet paper for cleaning after defecation. This practice was made well known to European football fans visiting Qatar during the 2022 FIFA World Cup. In Arabic, the shower is called a shaṭṭafa (شَطَّافَة).

The use of water in many Christian countries is due in part to the biblical toilet etiquette which encourages washing after all instances of defecation. The bidet is common in predominantly Catholic countries where water is considered essential for anal cleansing, and in some traditionally Orthodox and Protestant countries such as Greece and Finland respectively, where bidet showers are common.

== See also ==
- Bidet
- Hygiene in Christianity
- Islamic toilet etiquette
- Islamic hygienical jurisprudence
- Tabo (hygiene)
- Lota (vessel)
- Toilets in Japan
- Washlet
