= Kumgan =

Jug with sprout of Asian origin

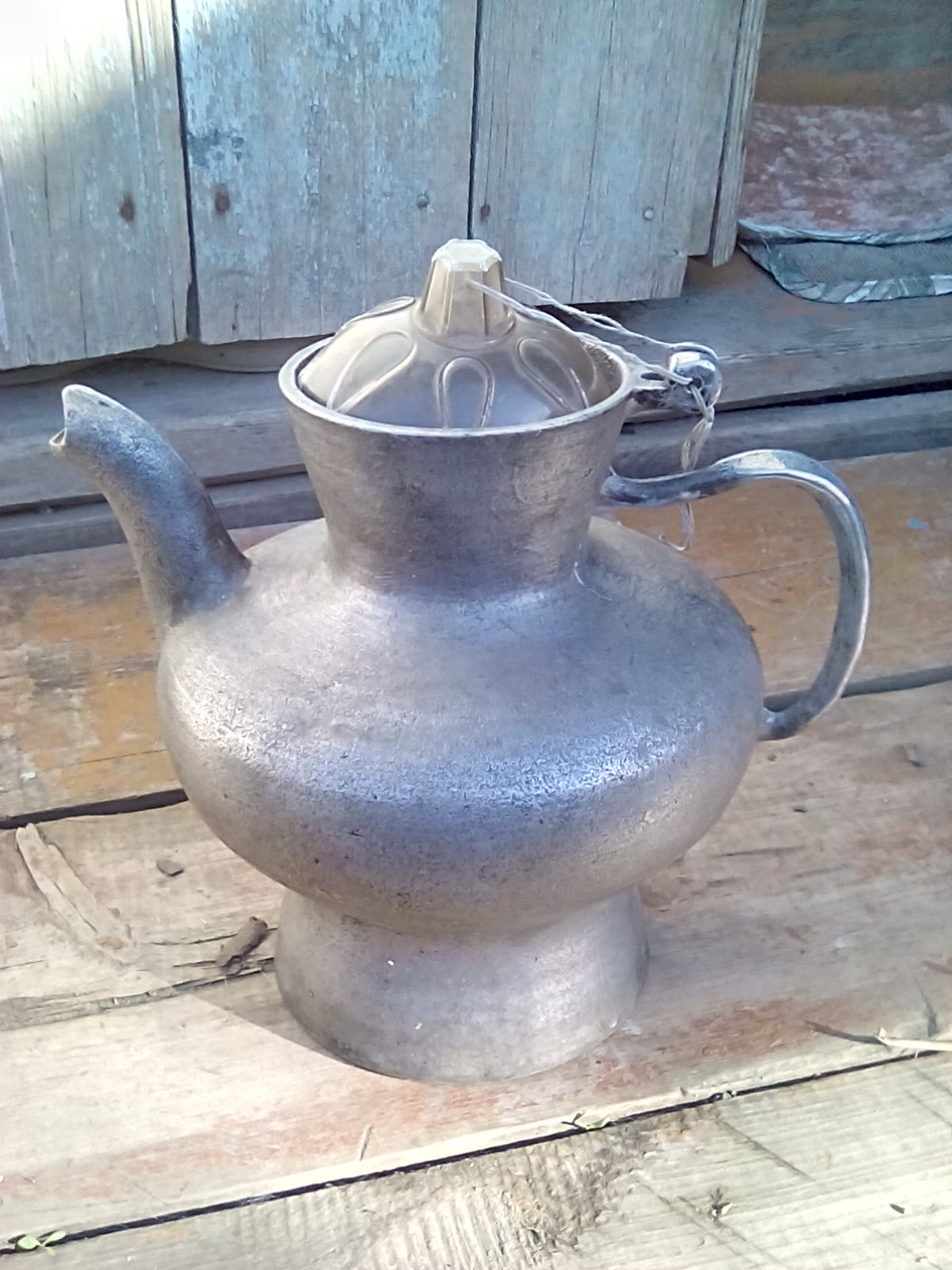
An ordinary kumgan

Kumgan is a jug for water with a spout, handle, and lid, made of brass, silver, or clay. The name is used in Central Asia and originates from Turkic quman. Also known under the Persian name aftabeh (آفتابه), historically they were used in Asia primarily for washing oneself and hands, following the tradition of performing natural needs in the Islamic East. When they arrived to Russia from central Asia in 16th–17th centuries, their purpose changed and they had become a vessel for drinking and they started being made of less noble metals.

This word was recorded in Russian by Vladimir Dal as hand-washing vessel, also colloquially called кубган, кулган, курган.

The word quman also gave rise to the Ukrainian jug kumanets ("little quman"), which was used for drinks, such as horilka in the past, but now it is mainly of decorative use. It had a peculiar doughnut shape. This kind of jug was called kvasnik in Russia, literally "a jug for kvass".

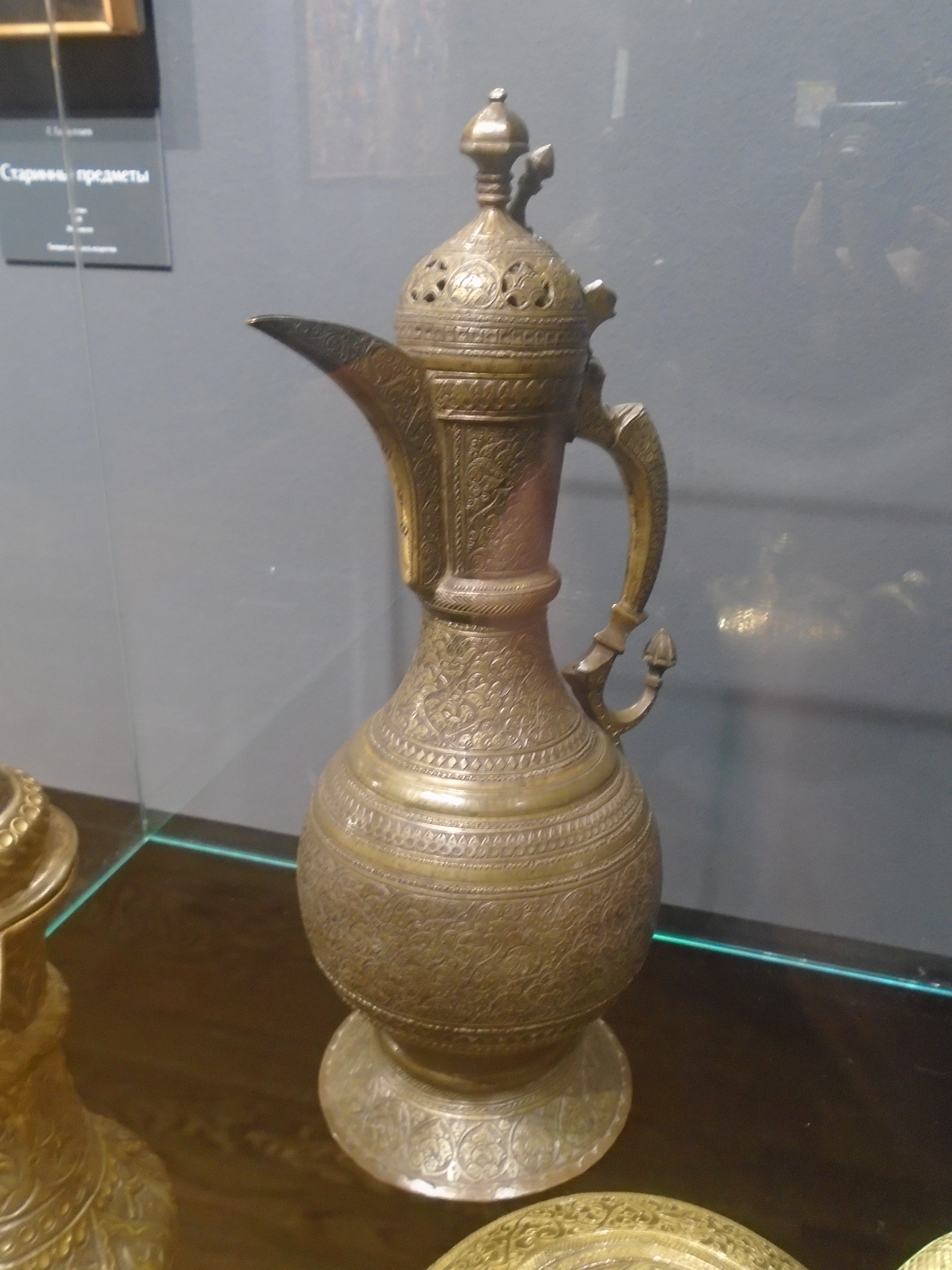
Kumgan from Uzbekistan

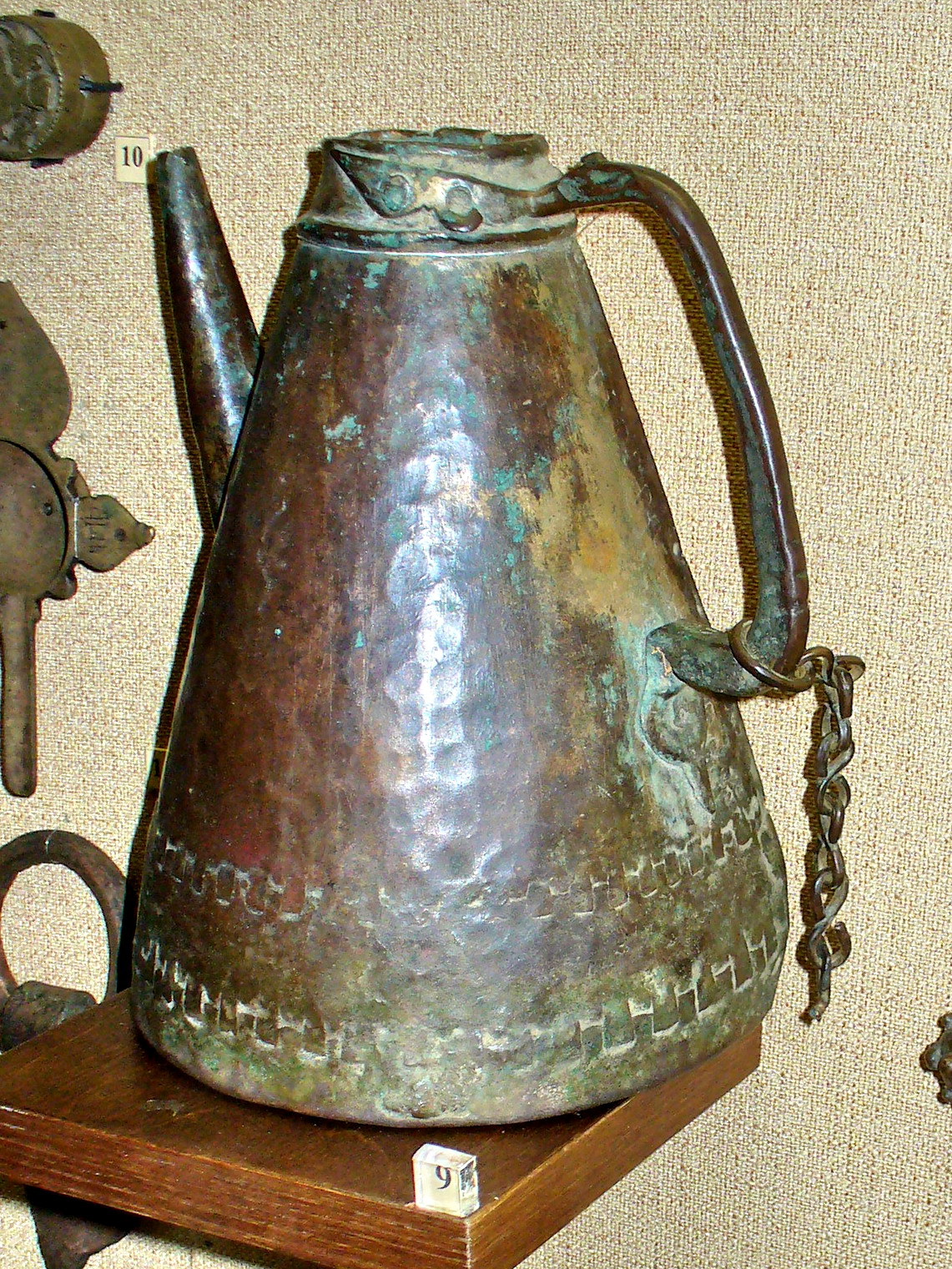
Kumgan from Volga Bulgaria

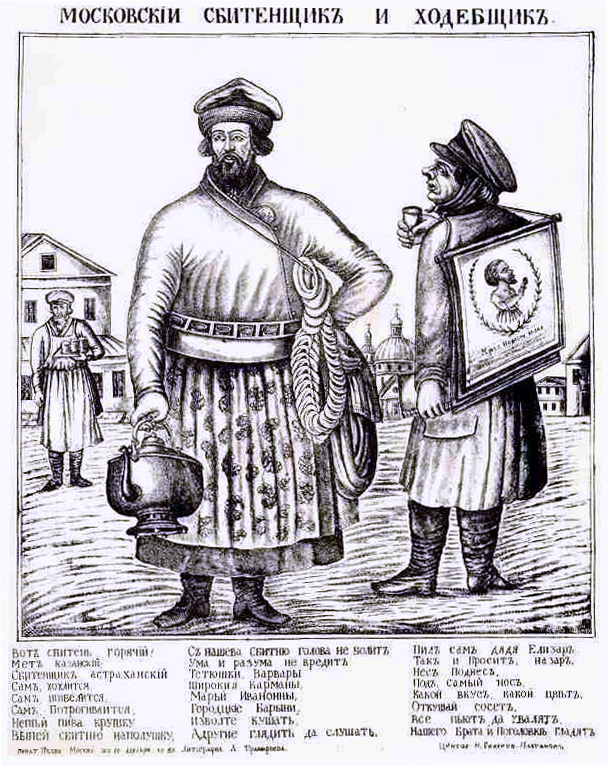
Sbitenshchik with kumgan for sbiten

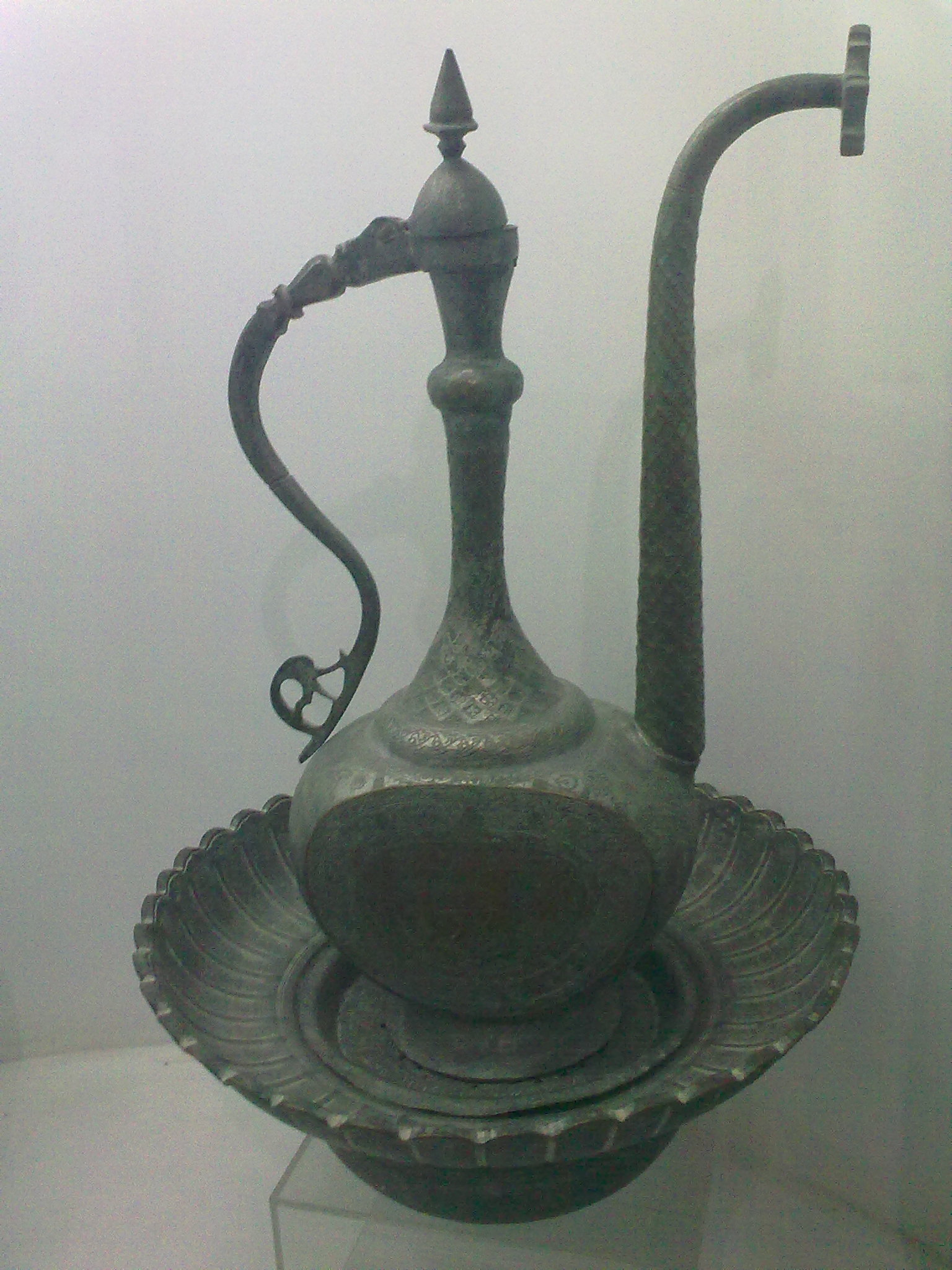
Aftafeh from Arak, Iran

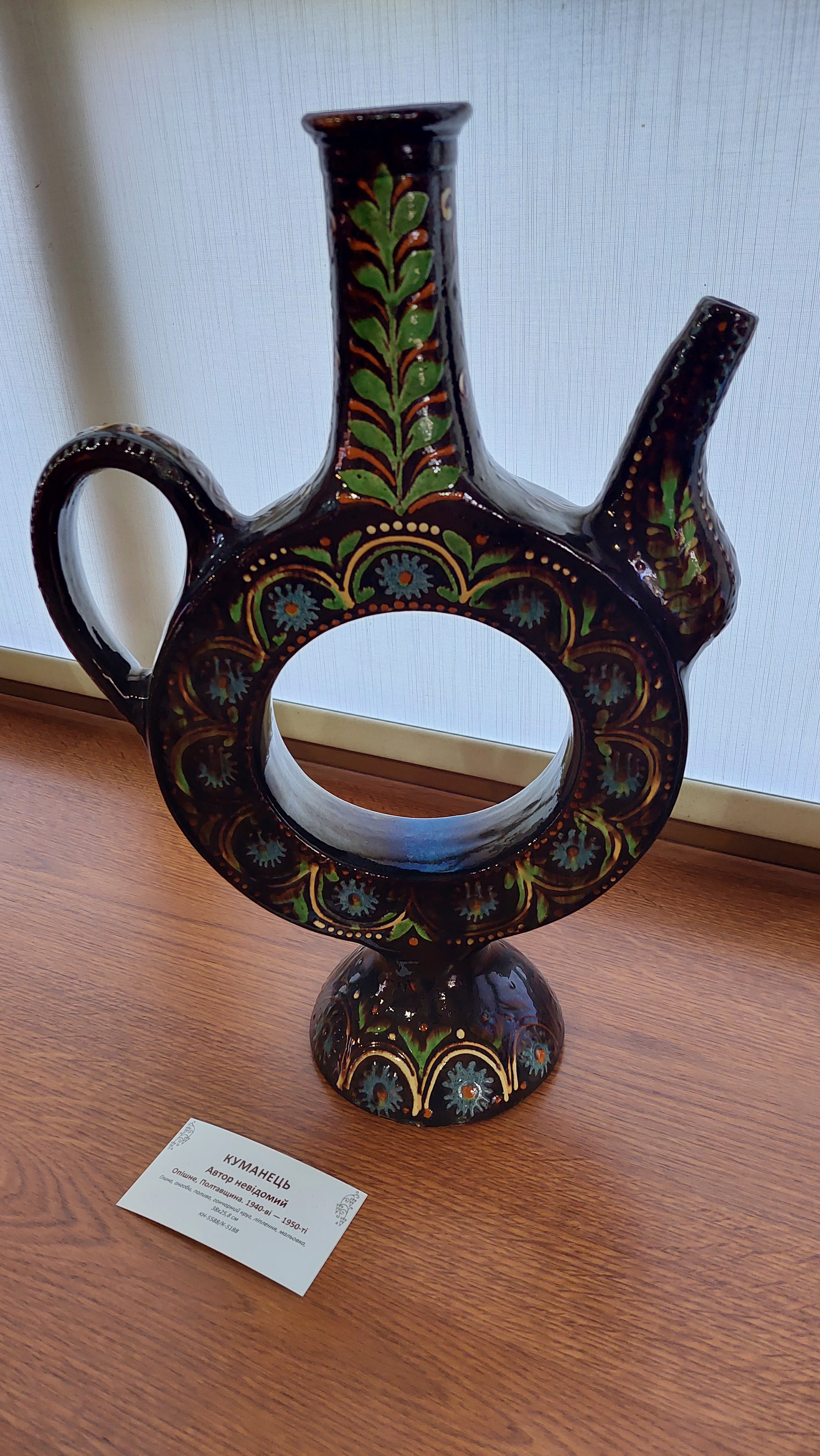
Kumanets from Poltava

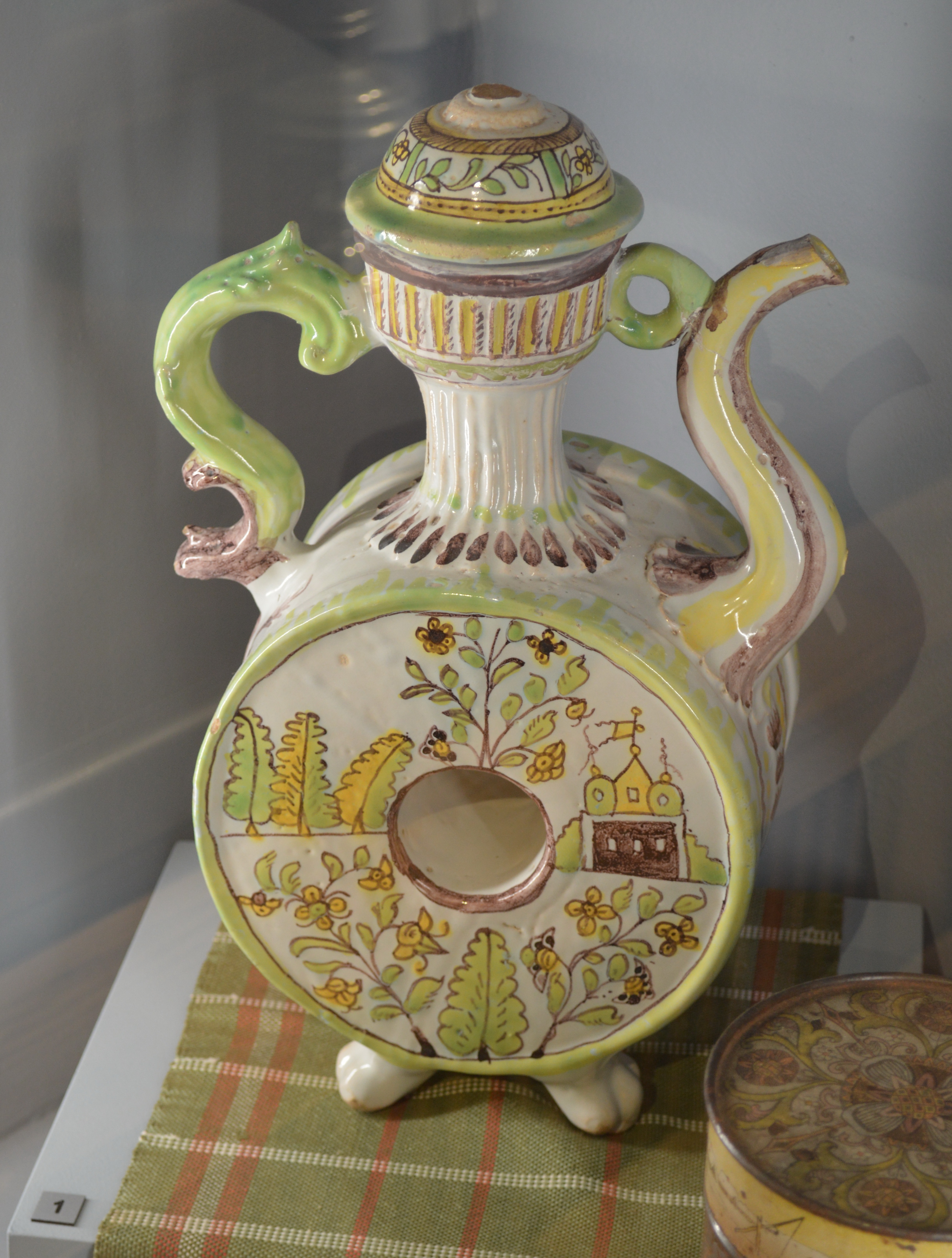
Kvasnk, Tver
