= Oras (company) =

Finnish manufacturer

Oras Ltd
- Company type: Limited company
- Founded: 1945
- Founder: Erkki Paasikivi
- Headquarters: Rauma, Finland
- Area served: Europe
- Key people: Kari Lehtinen (CEO)
- Products: Faucets, Showers, Technical valves
- Revenue: €131.1 million (2012)
- Owner: Oras Invest Ltd.
- Number of employees: 920 (2012)
- Website: www.oras.com

Oras Oy is a Finnish manufacturer of bathroom and kitchen faucets. The company was founded in Rauma in 1945 by Erkki Paasikivi. Oras is the fourth largest faucet manufacturer in Europe, and it holds 30–80 percent of the market share in Finland. The company has two factories, which are located in Olesno, Poland and Rauma.

== Overview ==
Oras' head office is located in Rauma and its production facilities are located in Finland, Poland, Germany and the Czech Republic. In 2012, it employed approximately 920 people in Europe, of which approximately 600 employees and white-collar workers in Finland. The raw materials and production components are also primarily sourced from Europe. Oras has its own sales organization in more than 15 European countries. Oras' most significant brands are Oras and Hansa.

In July 2025, it was announced that Oras acquires Gustavsberg and Vatette business from Villeroy & Boch.

== History ==
Oras was founded in Rauma, Finland, on 8 May 1945 as a small metal workshop established by Erkki Paasikivi, Irja Paasikivi and Irja's father Kosti Oras. In its early years, the company operated from a cellar workshop and initially carried out general metalworking and repair work before moving into products for the building-services sector. Oras entered the HVAC field in 1947 with radiator connectors, and began faucet production in 1951, a change that became the basis of its later specialization.

During the 1950s and 1960s, Oras expanded its manufacturing in Rauma. The company established its own foundry in 1955 and brought chrome-plating in-house in 1963, which supported larger-scale faucet production. Production and office operations were gradually centralized in larger facilities in Rauma, and the company grew with the post-war building boom in Finland.

A major product milestone came in 1976 with the launch of the Safira single-lever faucet, which became one of the company's best-known products and strengthened its position in the Finnish market. In the following decade, Oras began expanding outside Finland through acquisitions. It acquired Goswin & Co. in Germany in 1982, the Finnish company Osy in 1983, and Lyng Armatur in Norway in 1984. In 1996, it expanded its manufacturing base further by acquiring a faucet factory in Olesno, Poland.

In 2013 Oras acquired the German faucet manufacturer Hansa. The transaction doubled the group's size and led to the creation of Oras Group, combining the Oras and Hansa brands. In 2025, Oras Group expanded its brand portfolio again when it completed the acquisition of the Gustavsberg and Vatette businesses and brands from Villeroy & Boch, adding those brands and related Nordic operations to the group.
