= Baptismal font =

Church furniture holding water for baptism

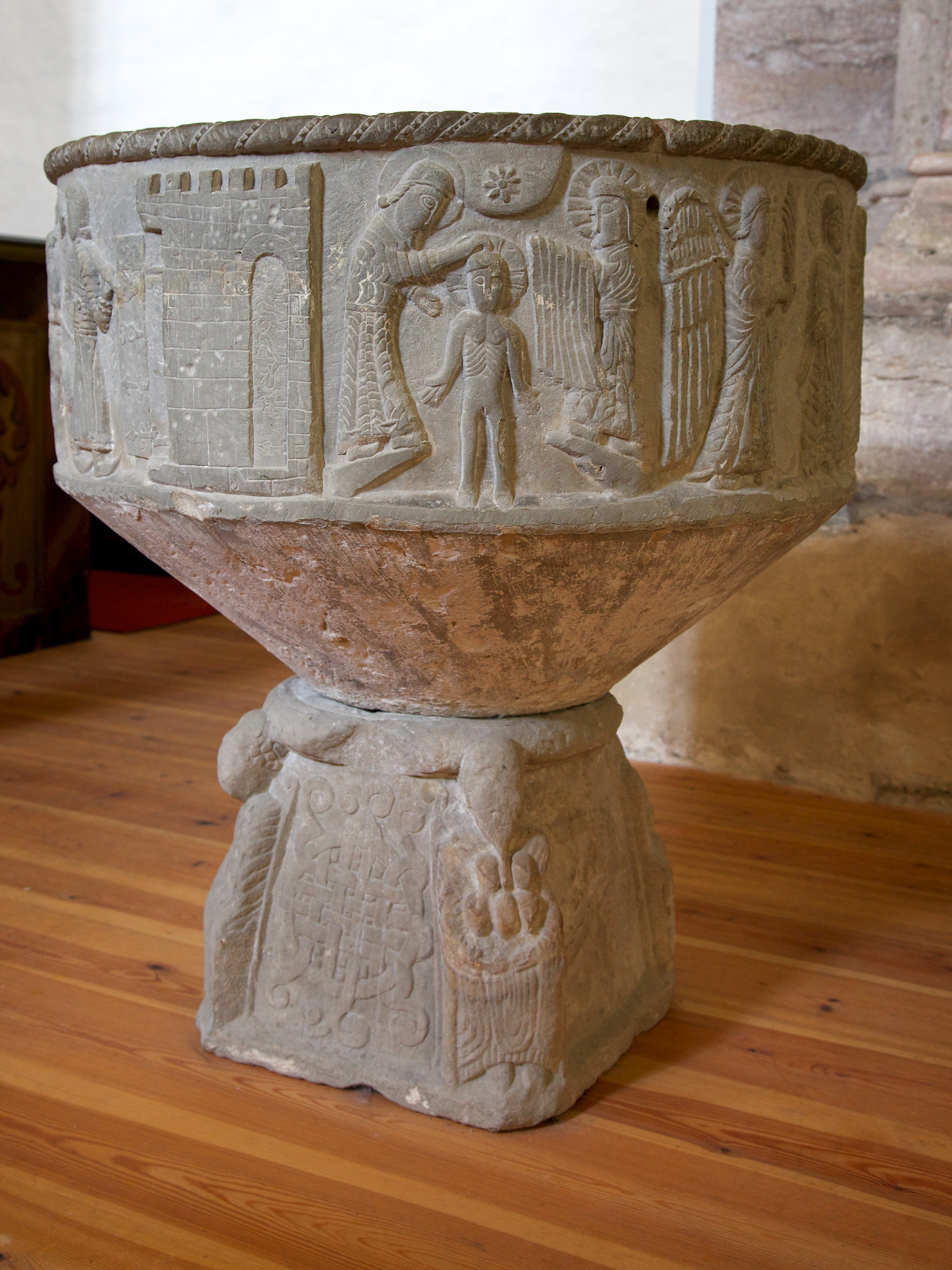
A Romanesque baptismal font from Grötlingbo Church, Sweden, carved by Sigraf, a master stone sculptor who specialised in baptismal fonts.

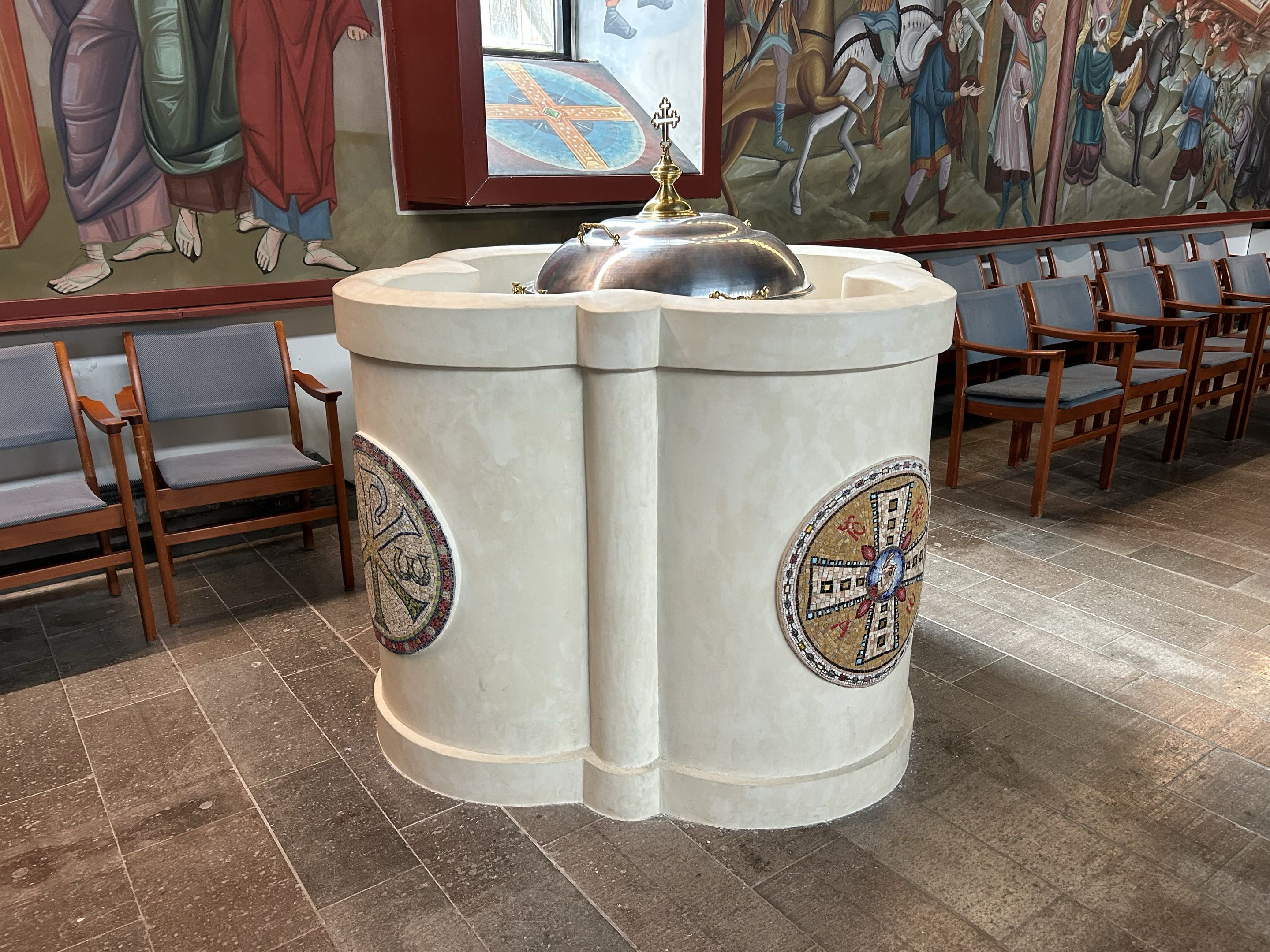
A baptismal font in Saint Stefan Dečanski Serbian Orthodox Church in Gothenburg, Sweden.

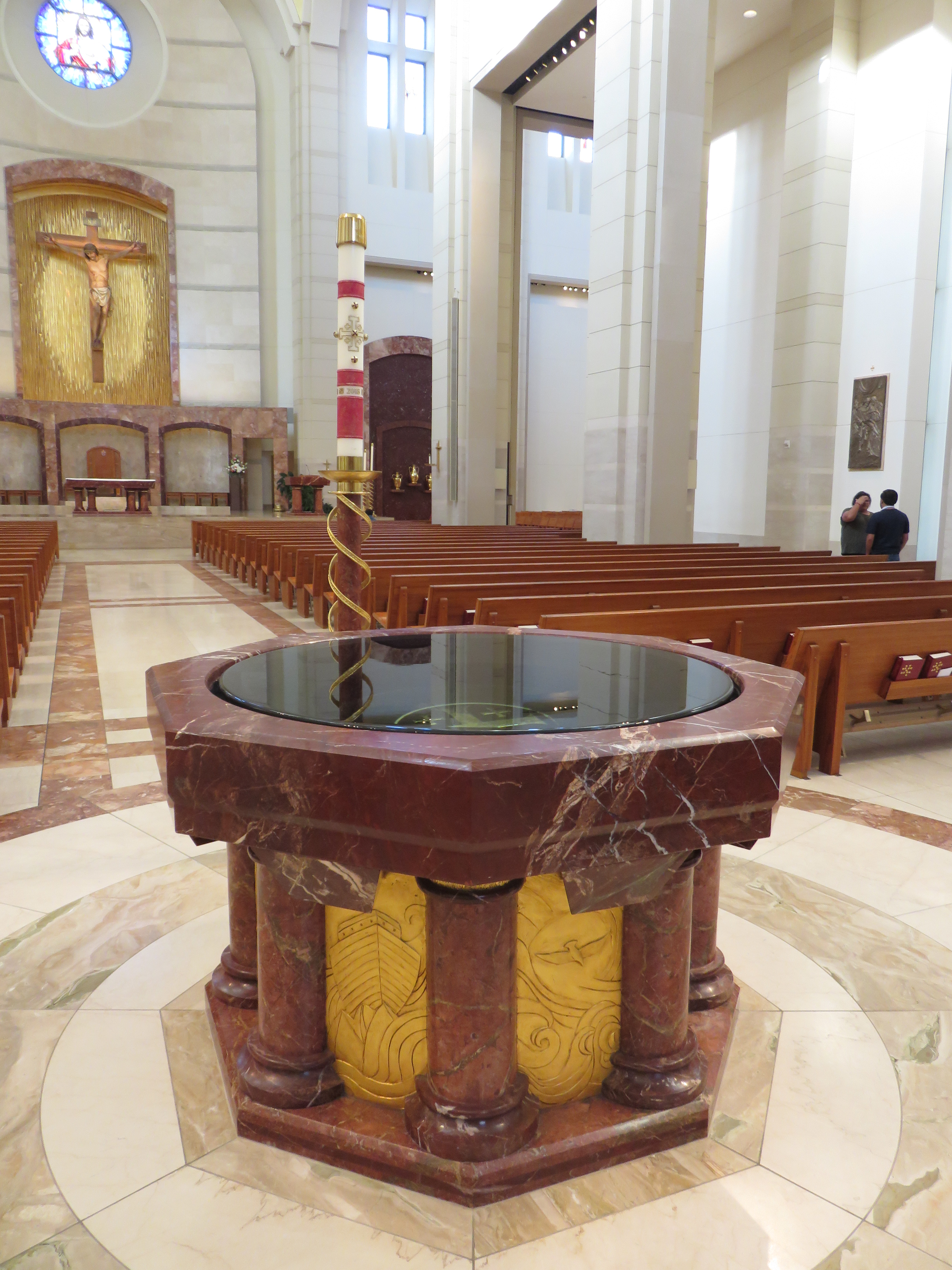
A modern baptismal font in the Co-Cathedral of the Sacred Heart in Houston, constructed in 2008

A baptismal font is an ecclesiastical architectural element, which serves as a receptacle for baptismal water used for baptism, as a part of Christian initiation for both rites of infant and adult baptism.

== Aspersion and affusion fonts ==
The earliest western fonts are found in the Catacombs of Rome. The fonts of many western Christian denominations that practice infant baptism are designed for baptisms using a non-immersive method, such as aspersion (sprinkling) or affusion (pouring). The simplest of these fonts has a pedestal with a holder for a basin of water. The materials vary greatly, consisting of carved and sculpted stone (including marble), wood, or metal in different shapes. Many fonts are in octagonal shape, as a reminder of the new creation and as a connection to the Old Testament practice of circumcision, which traditionally occurs on the eighth day. Some fonts are three-sided as a reminder of the Holy Trinity to represent the unity of Father, Son, and Holy Spirit as three persons in one.

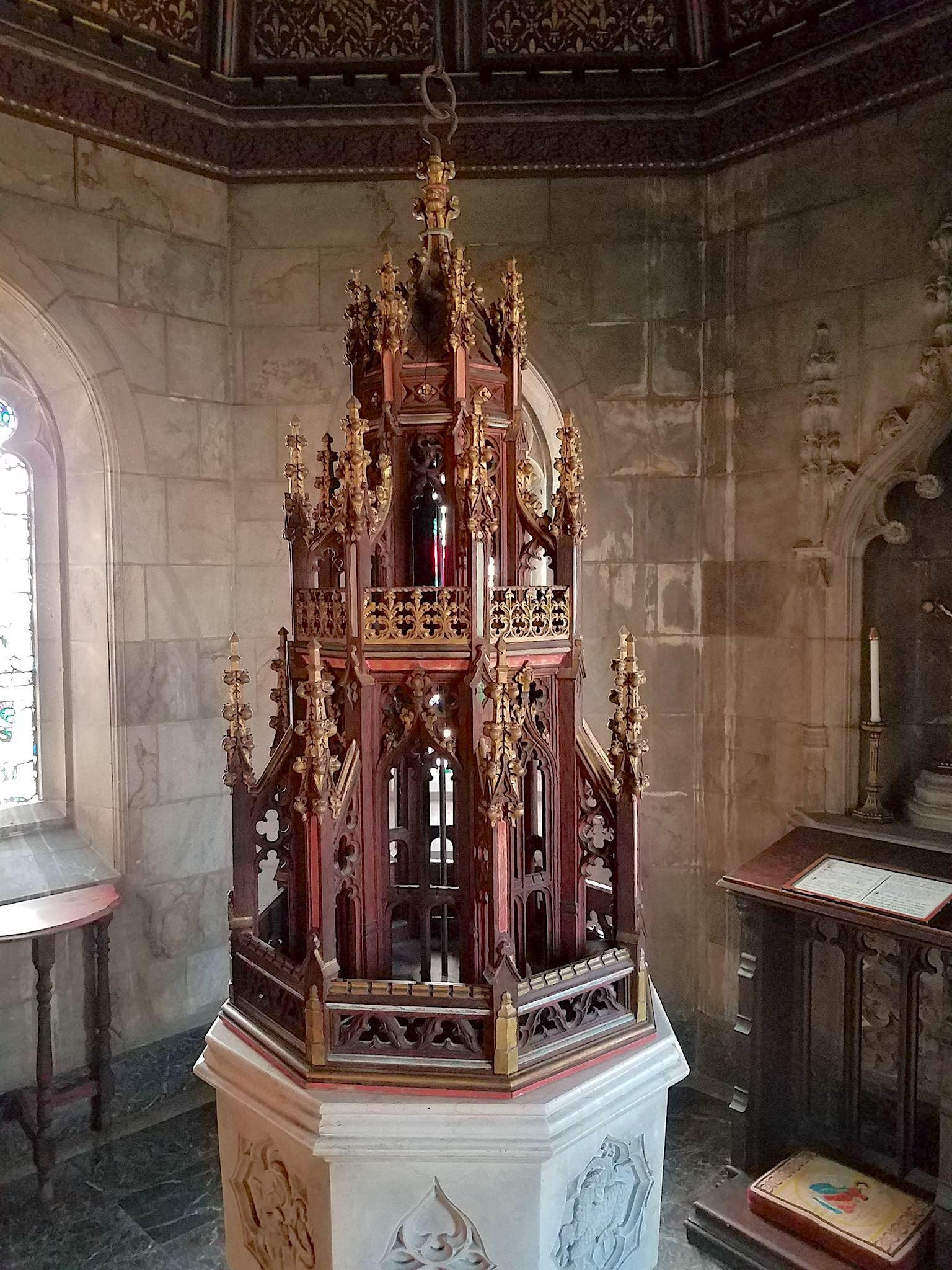
Detail of carved baptismal font cover (created 1930s), Episcopal Church of the Good Shepherd (Rosemont, Pennsylvania)

Fonts are often placed at or near the entrance to a church's nave to remind believers of their baptism as they enter the church to pray, since the rite of baptism served as their initiation into the Church. In Lutheran churches, the baptismal font may be located in the chancel near the altar to serve as a testament to Lutheran sacramental theology. In many churches of the Middle Ages and Renaissance, there was a special chapel or even a separate building for housing the baptismal fonts, called a baptistery. Both fonts and baptisteries were often octagonal (eight-sided), octagonal fonts becoming more common from the 13th century and the norm from the 14th century. Saint Ambrose wrote that fonts and baptisteries were octagonal "because on the eighth day, (Note: The sixth day of Holy Week was Good Friday; the following Sunday (of the resurrection) was thus the eighth day.) by rising, Christ loosens the bondage of death and receives the dead from their graves". Saint Augustine similarly described the eighth day as "everlasting... hallowed by the resurrection of Christ".

The quantity of water is usually small. There are some fonts where water pumps, a natural spring, or gravity keeps the water moving to mimic the moving waters of a stream. This visual and audible image communicates a "living waters" aspect of baptism. Some liturgical church bodies use consecrated holy water for the purpose of baptism, while others will use water straight out of the tap to fill the font. A special silver vessel called a ewer can be used to fill the font. Most baptismal fonts have covers to prevent water from evaporating and to protect baptismal water against contamination.

The mode of a baptism at a font is usually one of sprinkling, pouring, washing, or dipping in keeping with the Koine Greek verb βαπτίζω. Βαπτίζω can also mean "immerse", but most fonts are too small for that application. Some fonts are large enough to allow the immersion of infants, however.

=== Regional types ===
In certain regions of England, a common historic type of font design can be identified. In South East England the "Aylesbury font" can be seen in several churches in Buckinghamshire and the surrounding area. These fonts, which date from the late 12th Century around the years 1170 to 1190, are typically chalice-shaped, ornately carved around the rim with fluting below, and are considered fine examples of English Norman architecture. They are named after the font found in the Church of St Mary the Virgin, Aylesbury. Other identifiable types include the Early English "table-top" font, also found in Buckinghamshire; the "Bodmin font" in Cornwall, the "Seven Sacrament fonts" in East Anglia; and "Chalice fonts" in Herefordshire.

In Northern Europe, baroque font covers in the shape of a floating angel which are hung vertically from the ceiling of the choir became fashionable in the Lutheran churches of Germany, Denmark and Sweden during the 17th and 18th centuries. During the baptism ceremony, they were lowered using a pulley which symbolized the angel bringing the baptismal water directly from heaven.

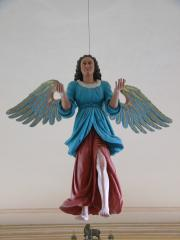
Floating baptismal angel of the font of the Angel Church, Hinterhermsdorf in Germany which gave its name to the church.

== Immersion fonts ==
The earliest baptismal fonts were designed for full immersion, and were often cross-shaped, usually with three steps to represent Holy Trinity, leading down into the baptismal pool. Often such baptismal pools were located in a separate building, called a baptistery; however, this baptismal practice was then relocated to be administered near the entrance of the church, mostly nearby the main door to signify entrance to the Church. As infant baptism became more common, fonts became smaller. Denominations that believe only in baptism by full immersion tend to use the term "baptismal font" to refer to immersion tanks dedicated for that purpose; however, in the Roman Catholic tradition, a baptismal font differs from an immersion.

Full-immersion baptisms may take place in a man-made tank or pool, or a natural body of water such as a river or lake. The entire body is fully immersed, dunked, submerged or otherwise placed completely under the water. This practice symbolizes the death of the old nature, as found in Romans 6:3–4. In Hagia Sophia, the water was supplied to the baptismal tank from a water tower. In the Eastern Orthodox Church, baptism is always by full triple immersion, even in the case of infant baptism (aspersion or pouring is permitted only in extremis). For this reason, Eastern baptismal fonts tend to be larger than their Western counterparts and they are usually portable. Eastern Orthodox fonts are often shaped like a large chalice (significant since the Orthodox administer Holy Communion to infants after baptism), and are normally fashioned out of metal rather than stone or wood. Symbolically, Orthodox baptismal fonts represent the womb of the Church, as well as the tomb of Christ, since the baptized individual is put into the tomb/womb and is brought out born into a new life in Christ. During the baptismal service, three candles are lit on or around the baptismal font, in honour of the Holy Trinity. In many Orthodox churches, a special kind of holy water, called "Theophany Water", is consecrated on the Feast of Theophany (Epiphany). The consecration (literally, "Great Blessing") is performed twice: the first time on the eve of the feast, in a baptismal font; the second, on the day of the feast, in a natural body of water.

In the Roman Catholic Church, especially after its Second Vatican Council (1962–1965), greater attention is being given to the form of the baptismal font. Currently, the Roman Catholic Church encourages baptismal fonts that are suitable for the full immersion of an infant or child, and for at least the pouring of water over the whole body of an adult. The font should be located in a space that is visibly and physically accessible, and should preferably make provision for flowing water.

Baptisms of the Church of Jesus Christ of Latter-day Saints are usually undertaken in a simple font located in a local meetinghouse, although they can be performed in any body of water in which the person may be completely immersed. In Latter-day Saint temples, where proxy baptisms for the dead are performed, the fonts rest on the sculptures of twelve oxen representing the twelve tribes of Israel, following the pattern of the Molten Sea in the Temple of Solomon (see 2 Chronicles 4:2-5).

== Examples ==
=== Aspersion and affusion fonts ===
Baptismal font in Röks Church (Evangelical-Lutheran) in Ödeshög, Sweden

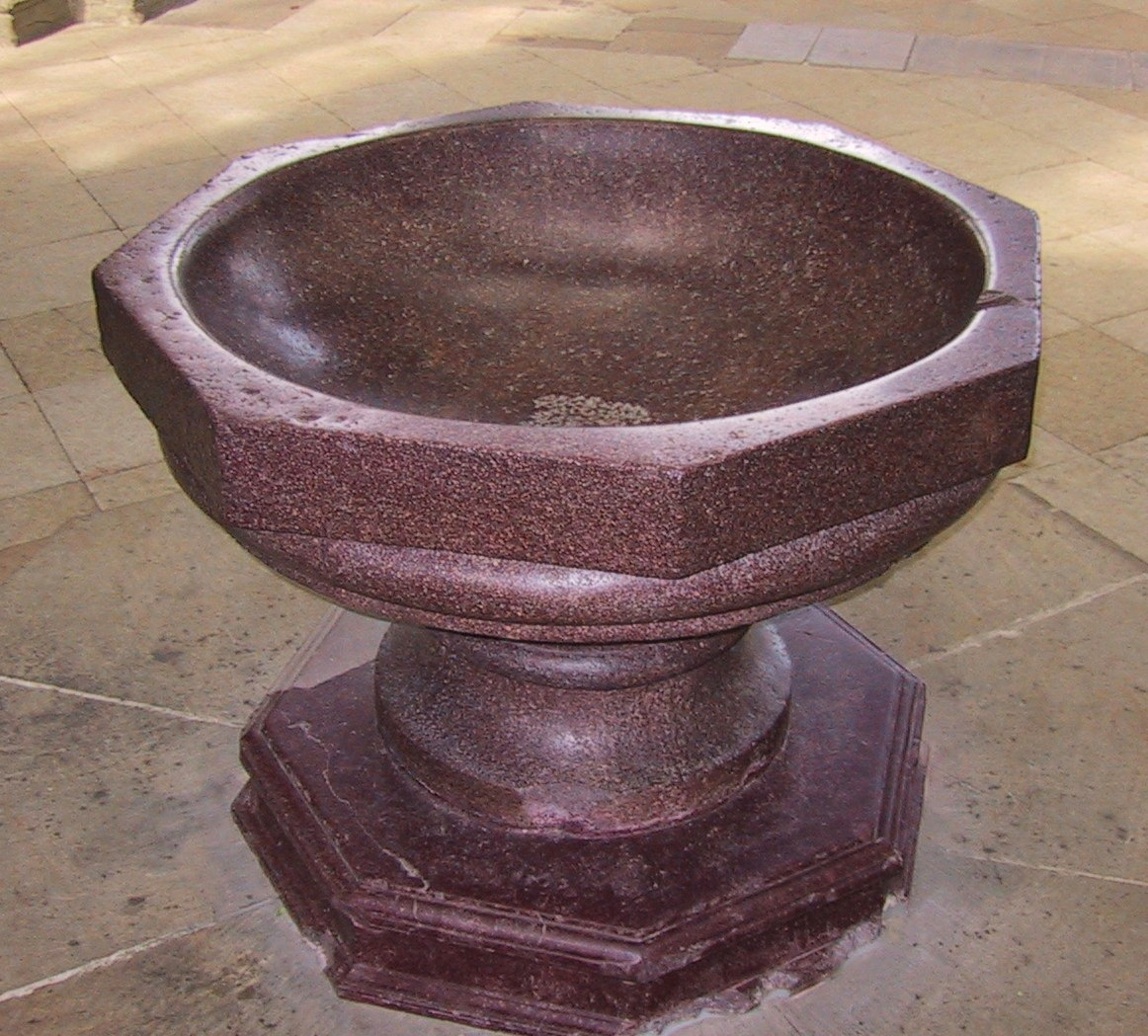
Octagonal baptismal font in Magdeburg Cathedral, Germany

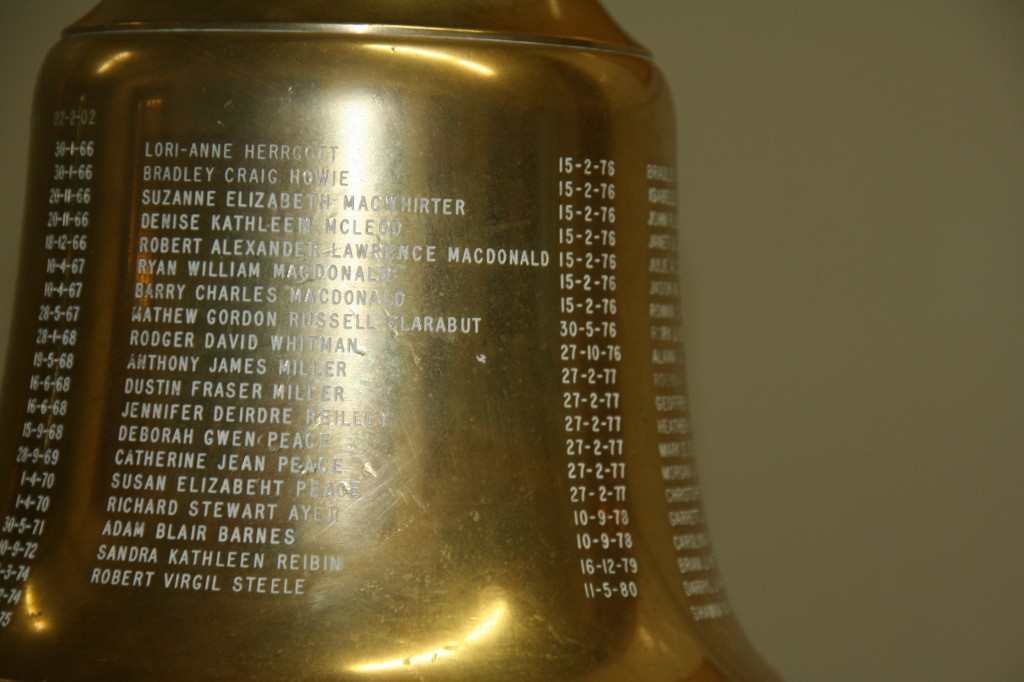
Ship's bell as Baptismal font at chapel, Yeo Hall, Royal Military College of Canada

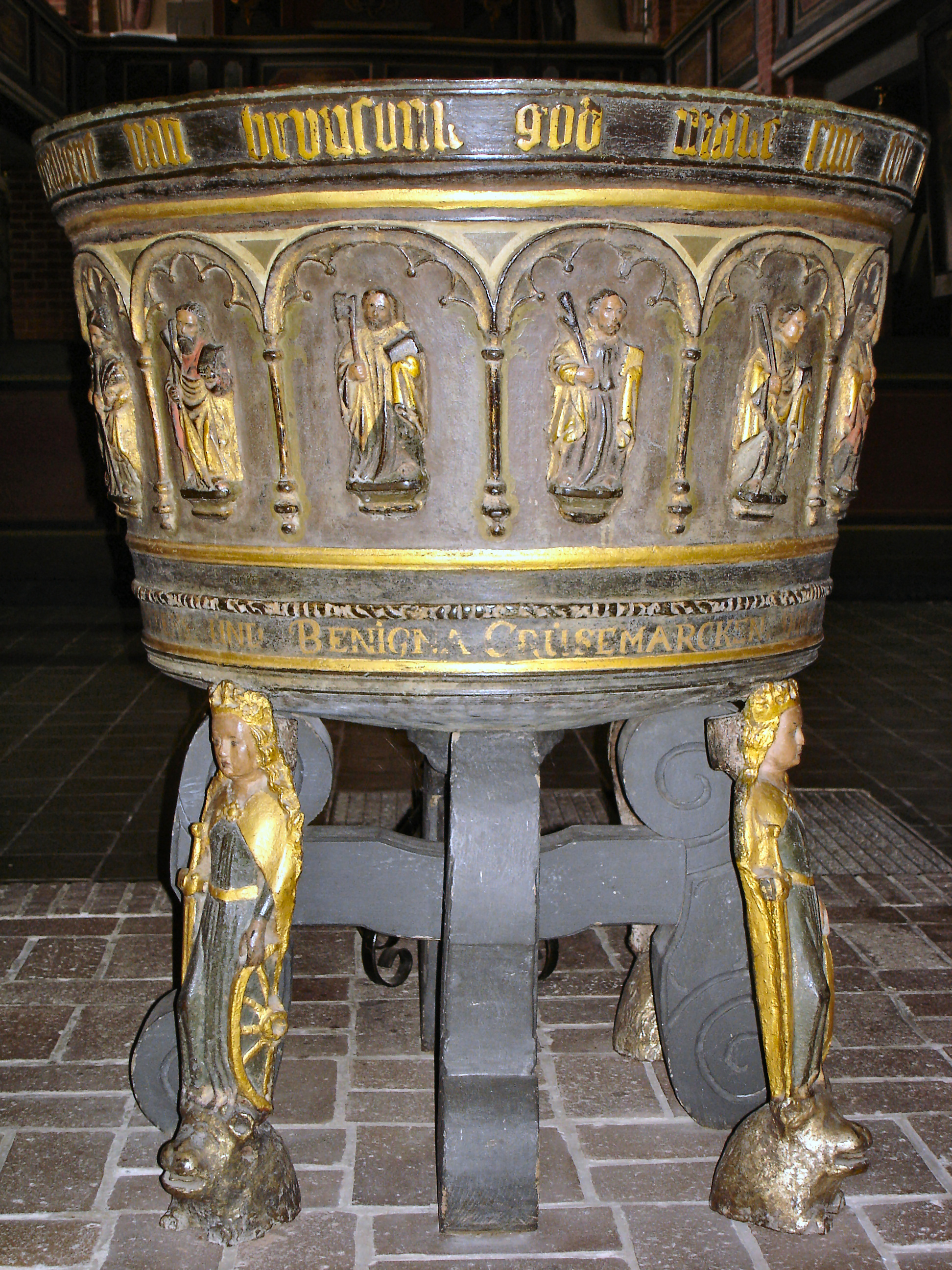
Font in a church at Lenzen, Brandenburg, Germany

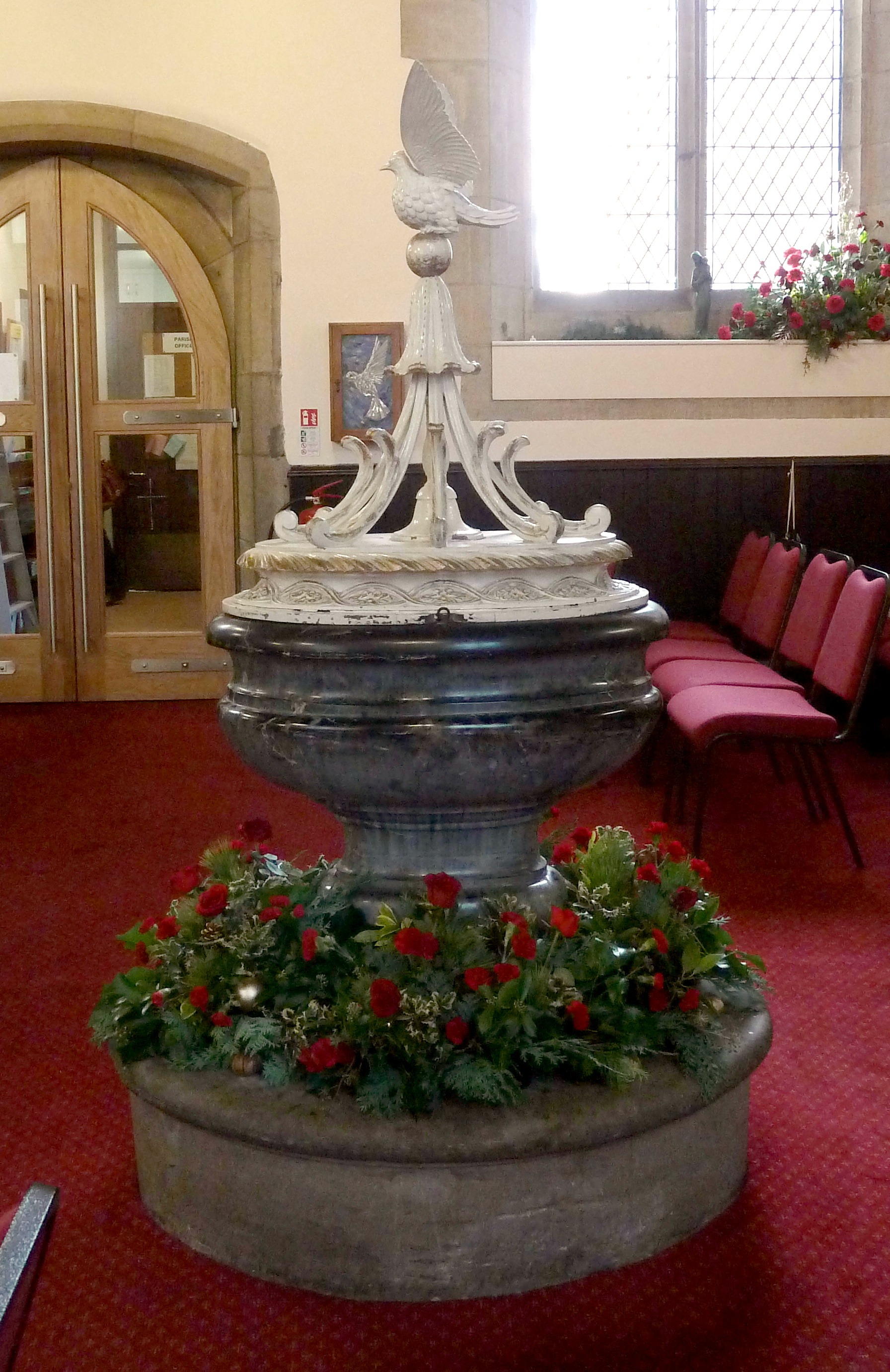
Oval marble font made before 1686, St Robert's Church, Pannal, North Yorkshire

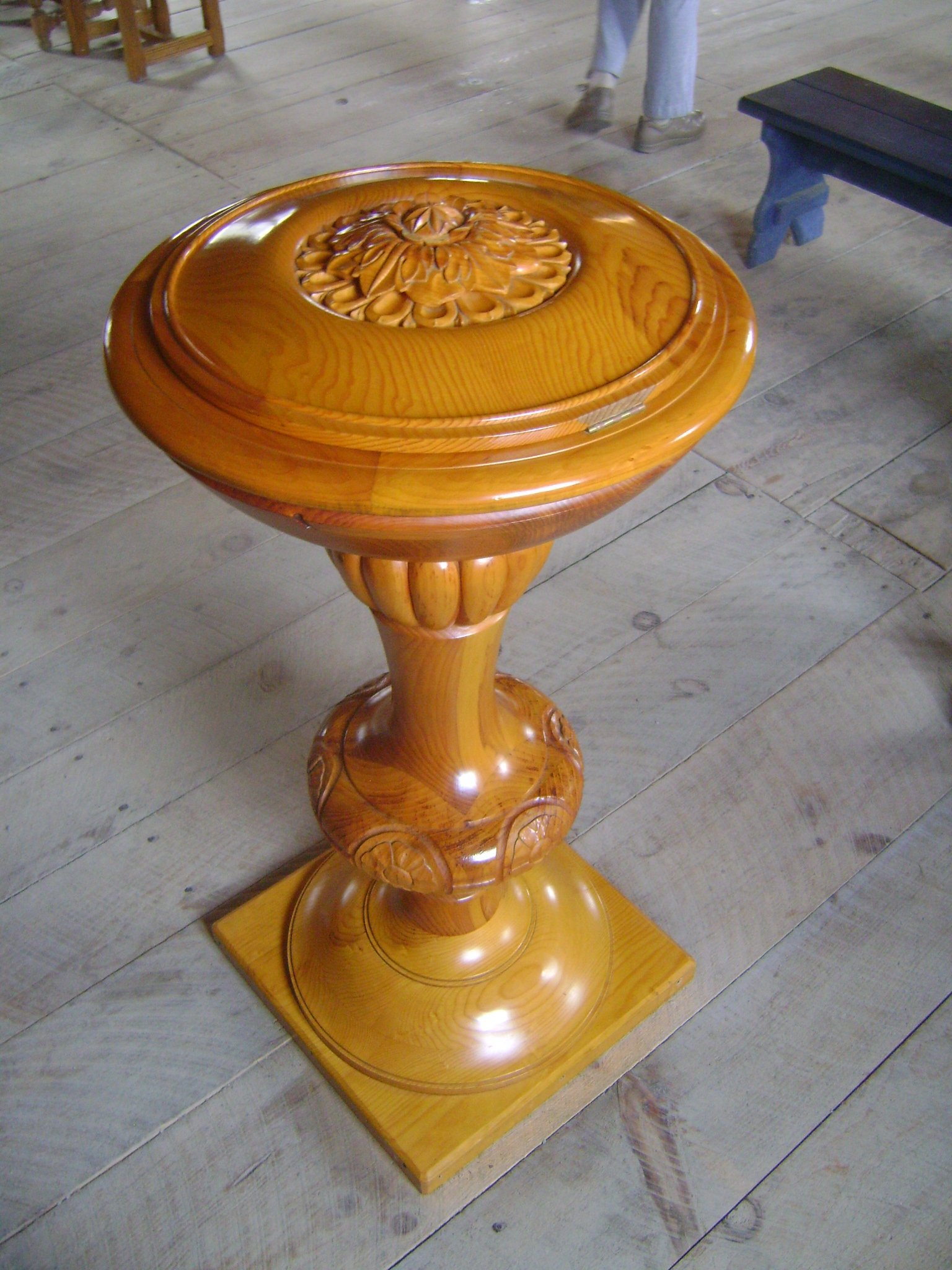
Baptismal font at Fort Michilimackinac in Mackinaw City, Michigan

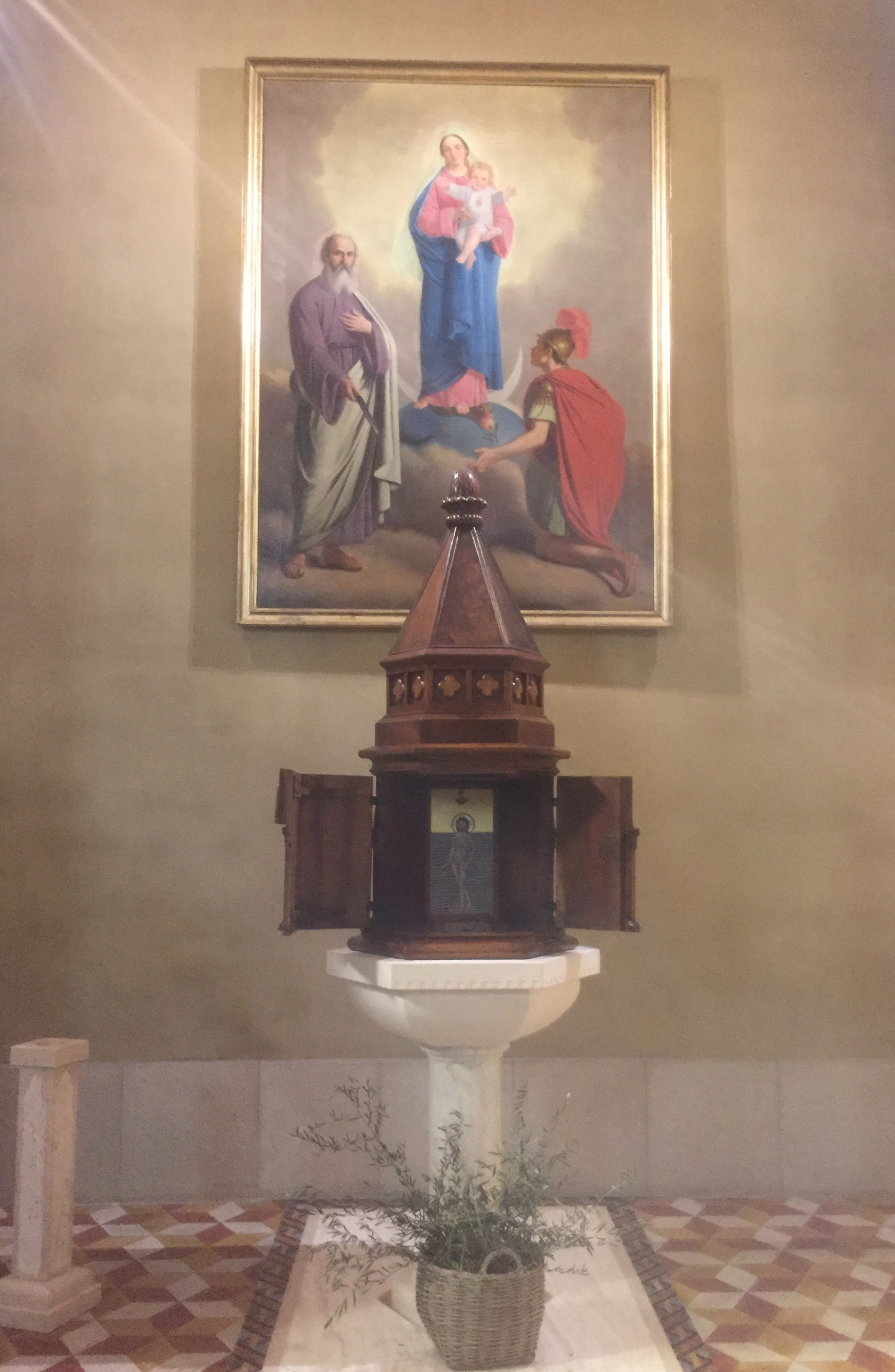
The baptismal font of Saint Bartholomew parish church in Marne, Italy

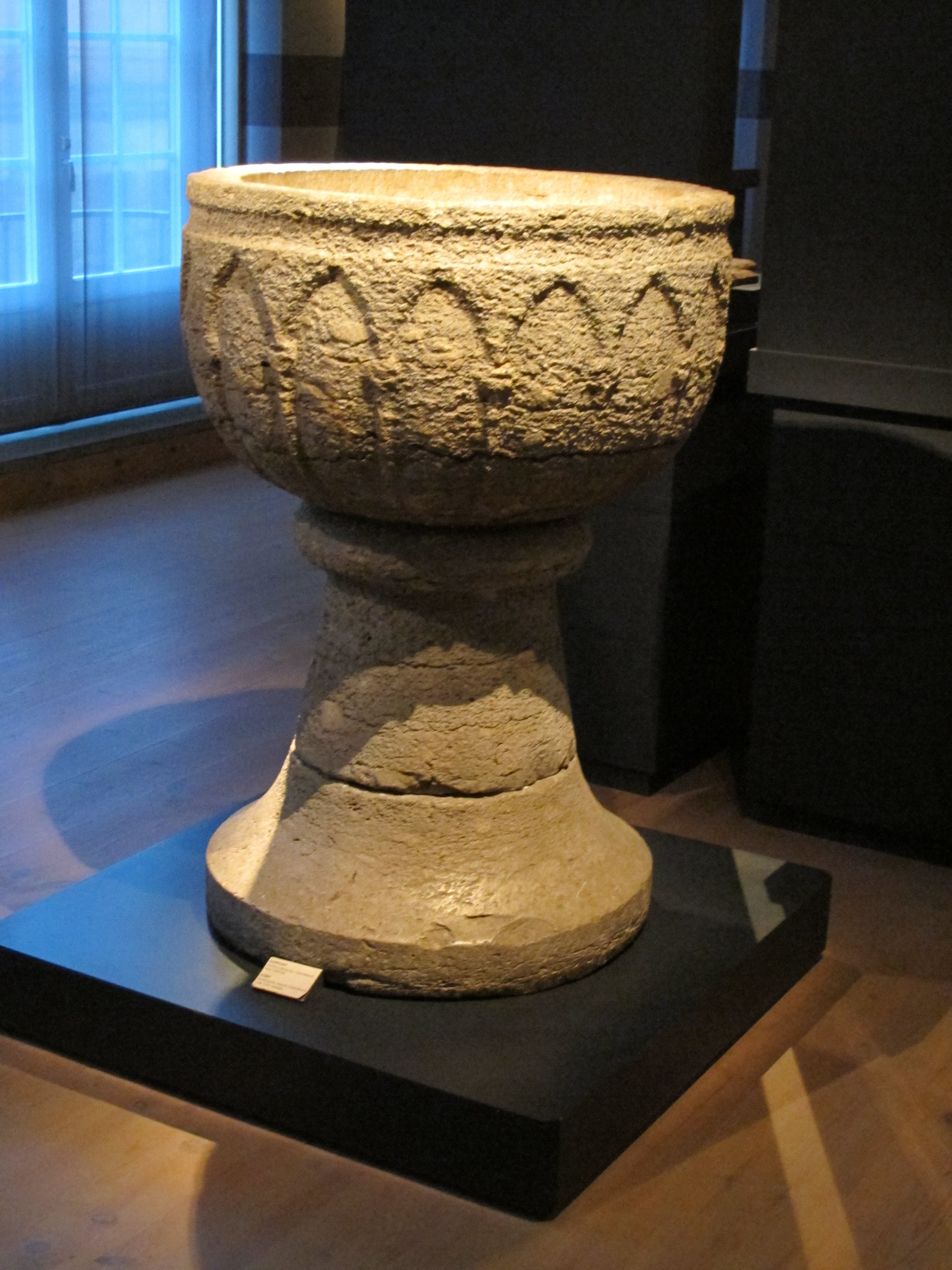
Hedesunda Church font, late 13th century, in Swedish History Museum, Stockholm

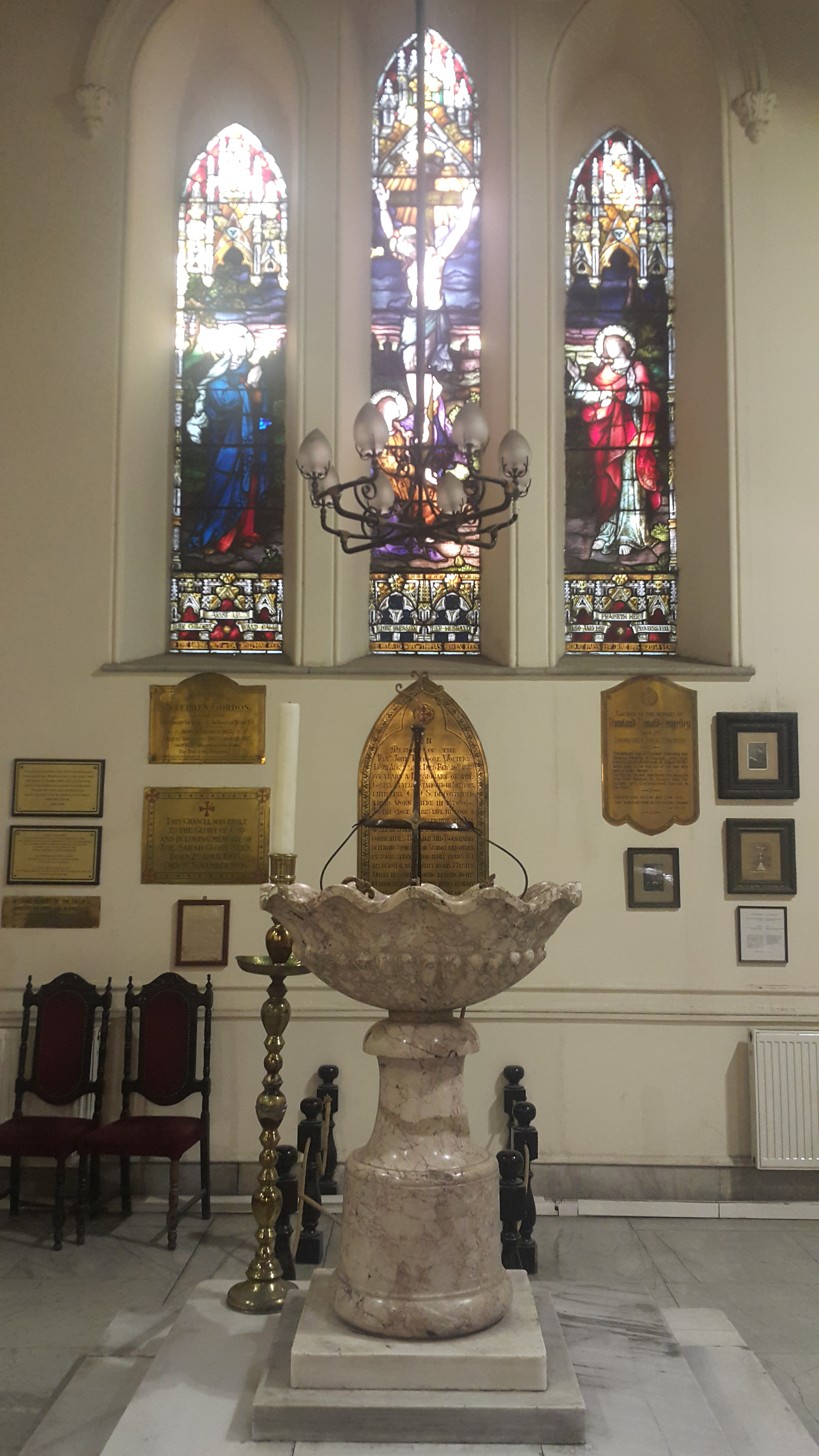
Baptismal font of St. John the Evangelist's Anglican Church, İzmir in the shape of a scallop

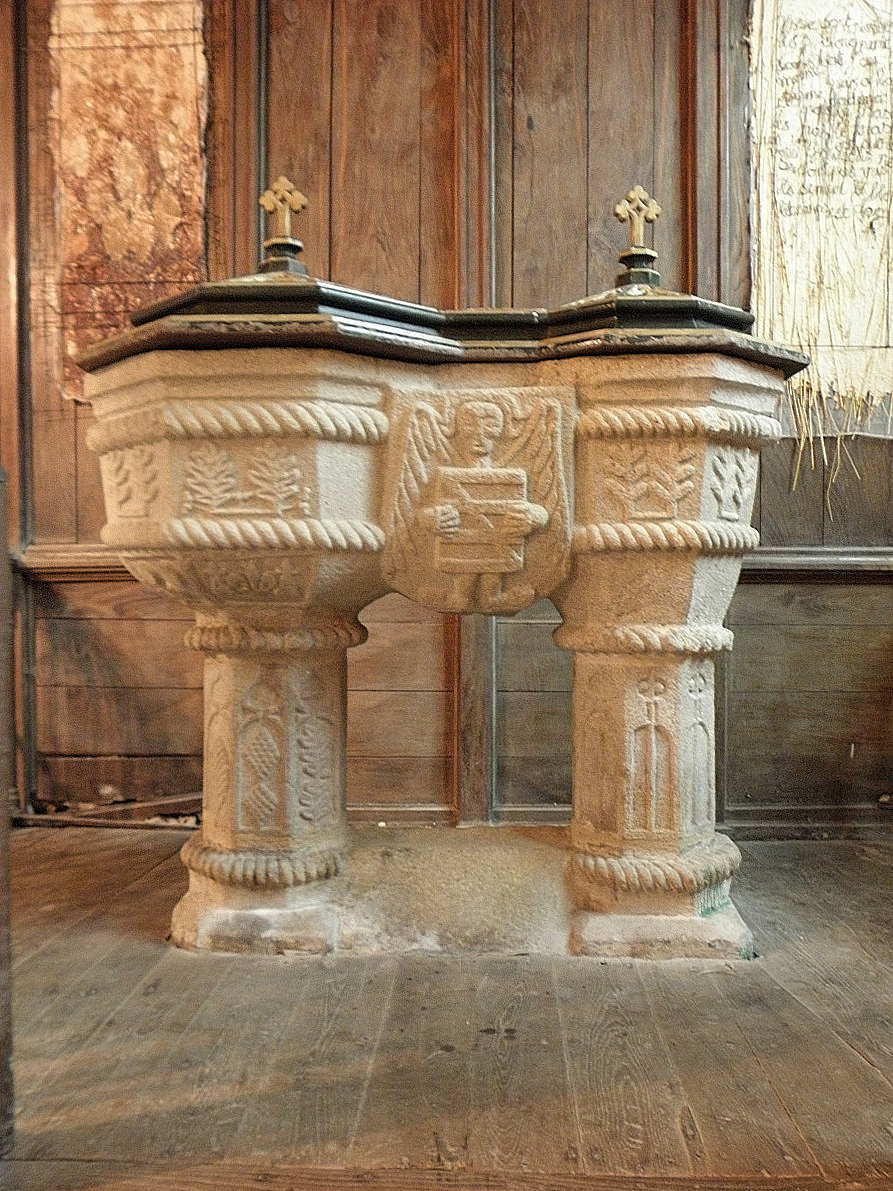
The twin-fonts of Saint-Léon Church of La Baussaine, France

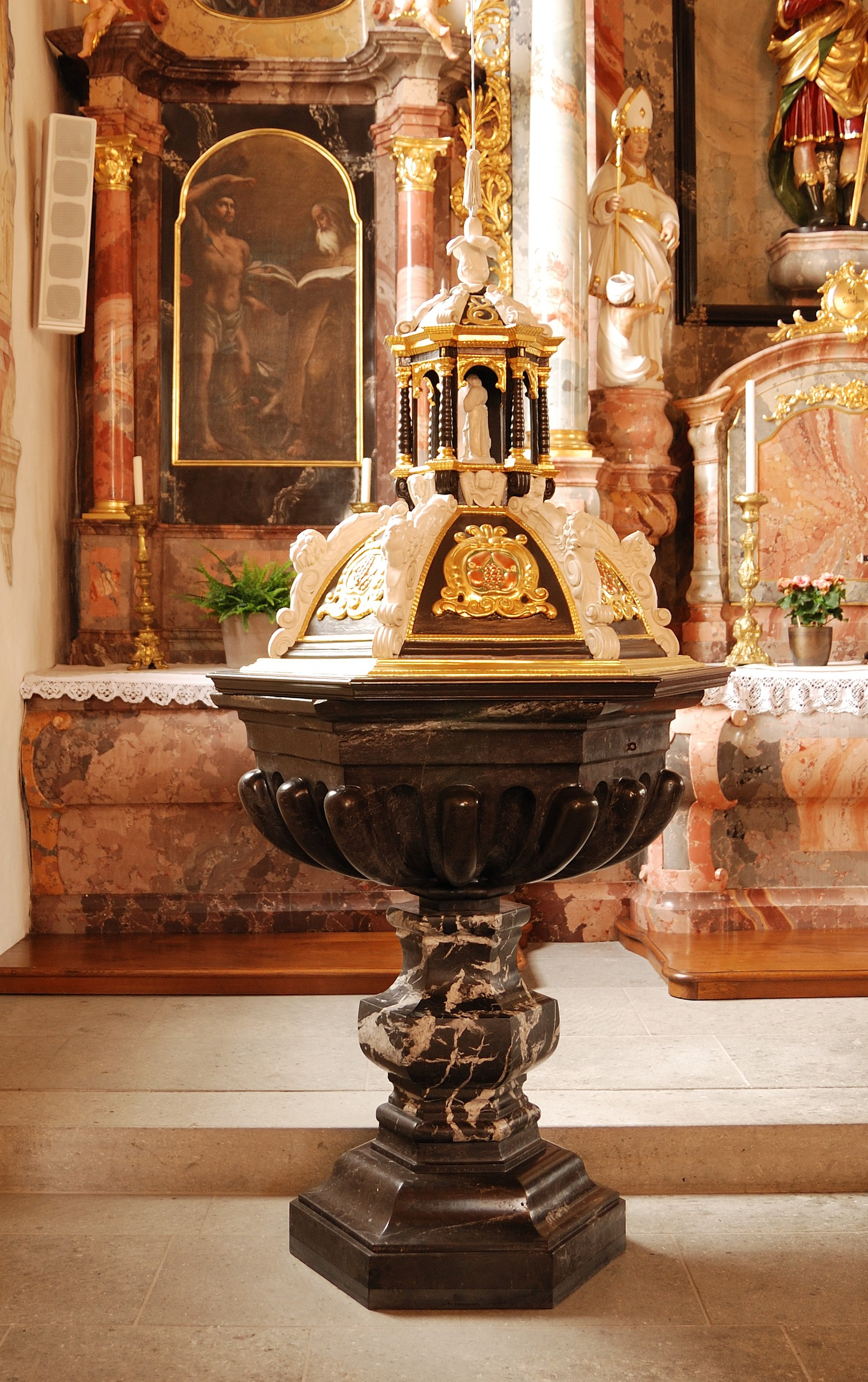
Baroque baptismal font of Catholic City Church of Bremgarten, Canton of Aargau, Switzerland

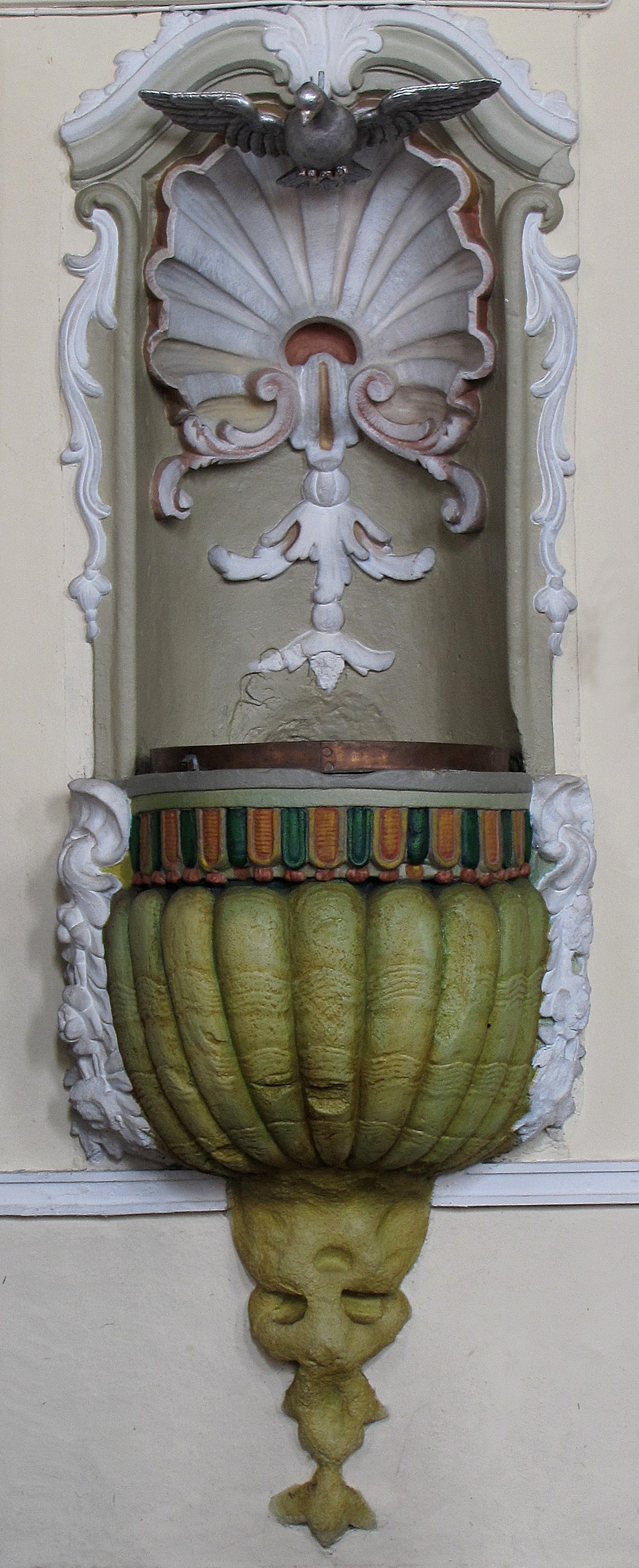
Font of Saint-Étienne Church depicts the Holy Spirit as a dove descending, in Wolxheim, France

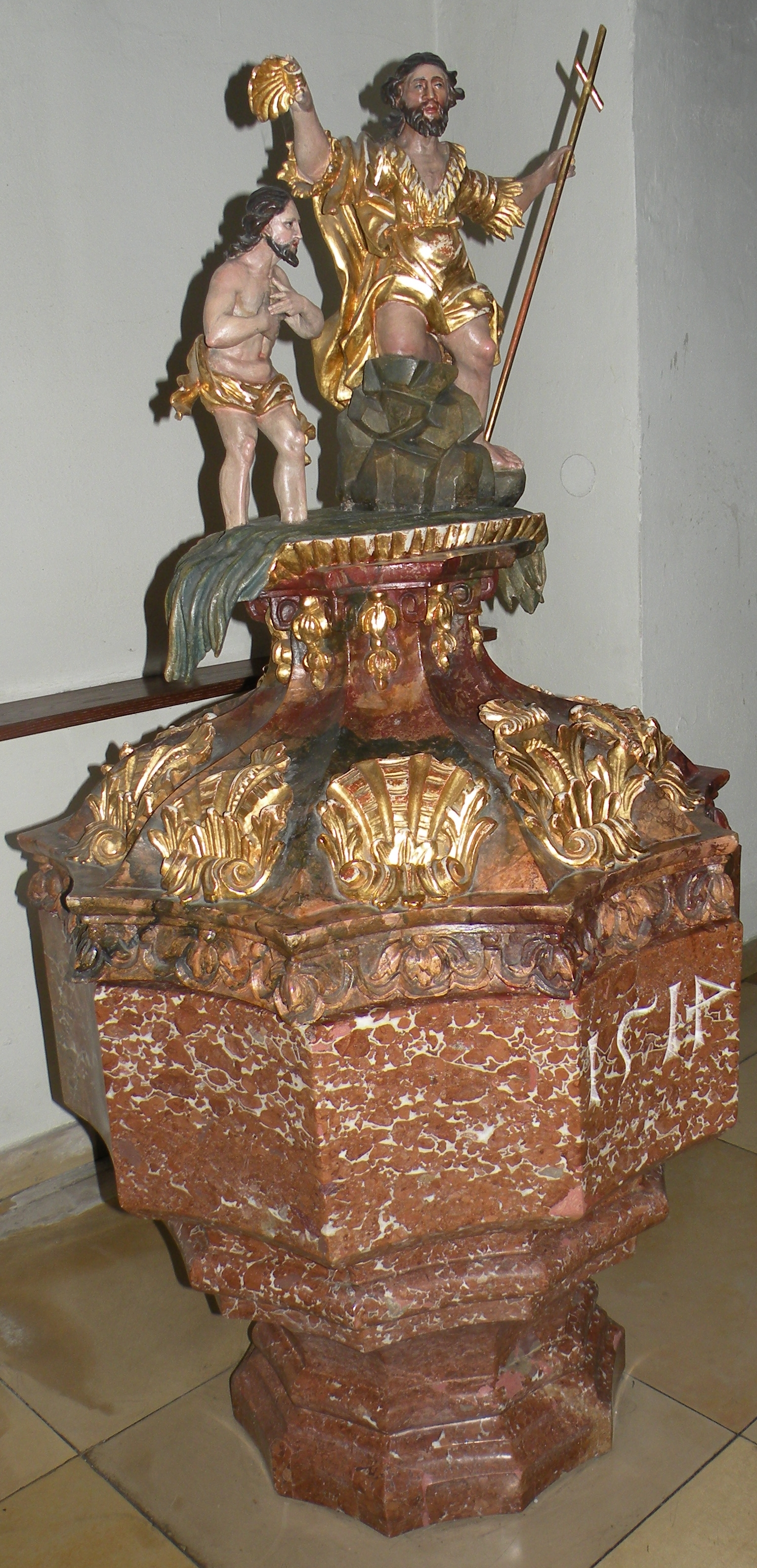
Gothic baptismal font of Catholic parish church of Perg, Austria

=== Immersion fonts ===
An Evangelical-Lutheran immersion font at Saint Thomas Church in Vällingby, Sweden

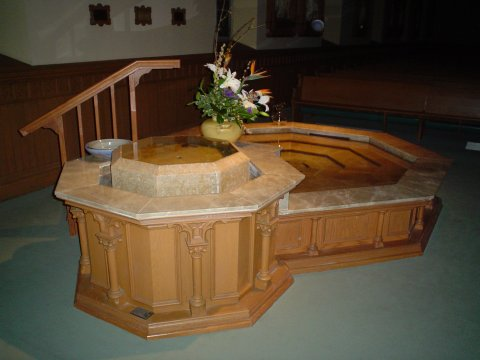
The baptismal font at St. Raphael's Cathedral, Dubuque, Iowa, was expanded in 2005 to include a small pool for immersion of adults.

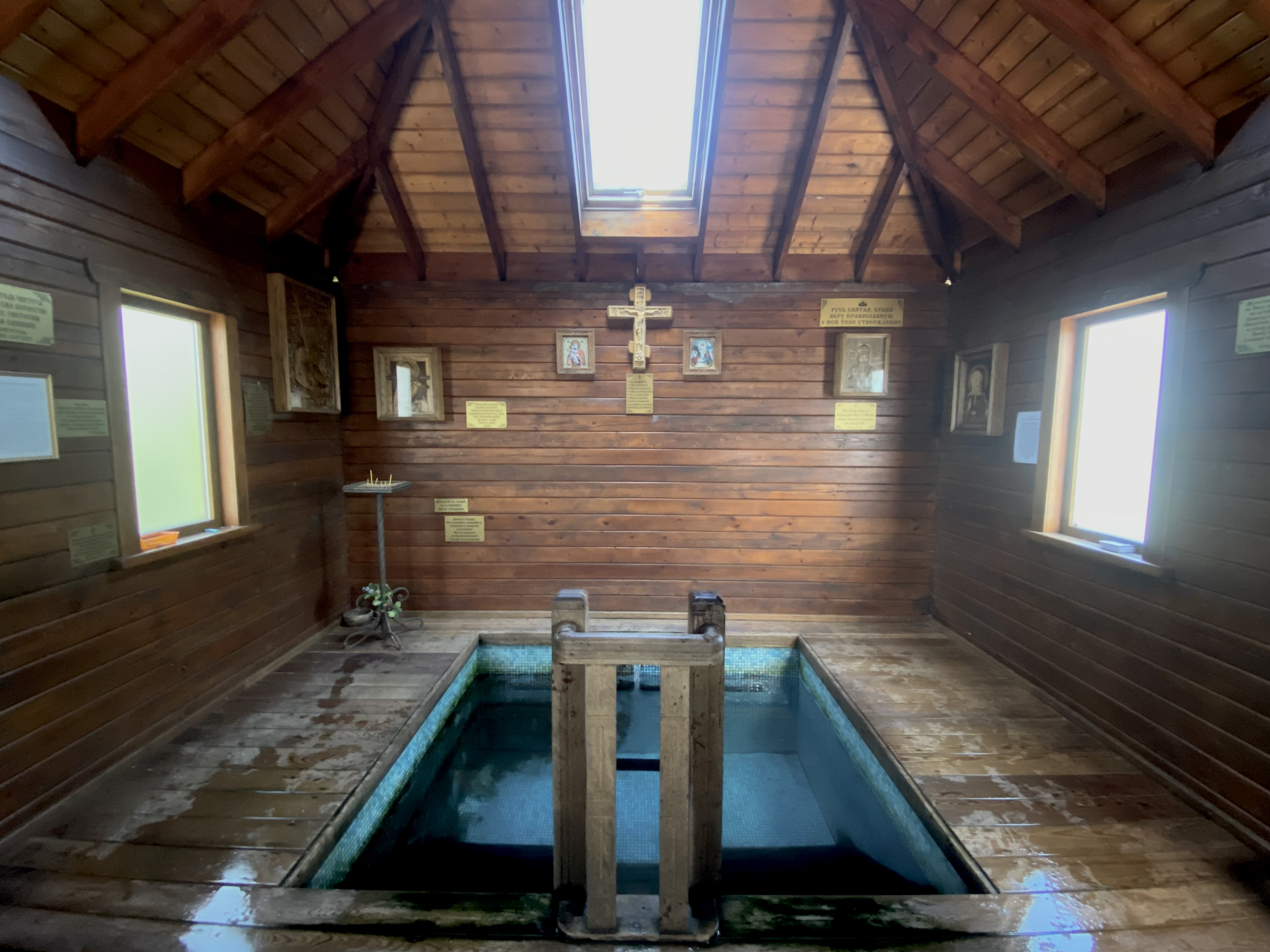
Russian Orthodox immersion font in Leninsky District, Tula Oblast, Russia

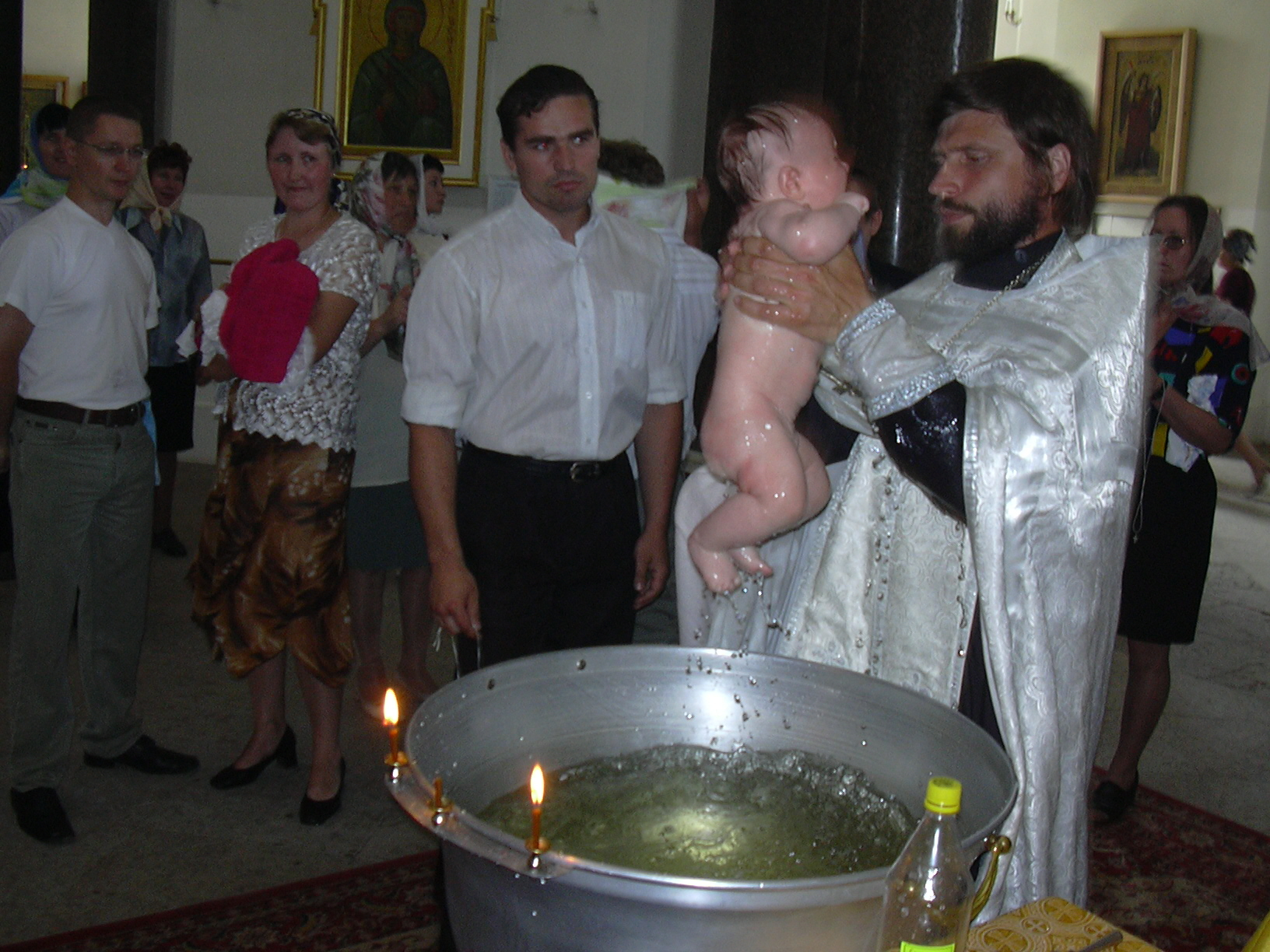
Baptism of an infant in the Russian Orthodox Church (St. Petersburg)

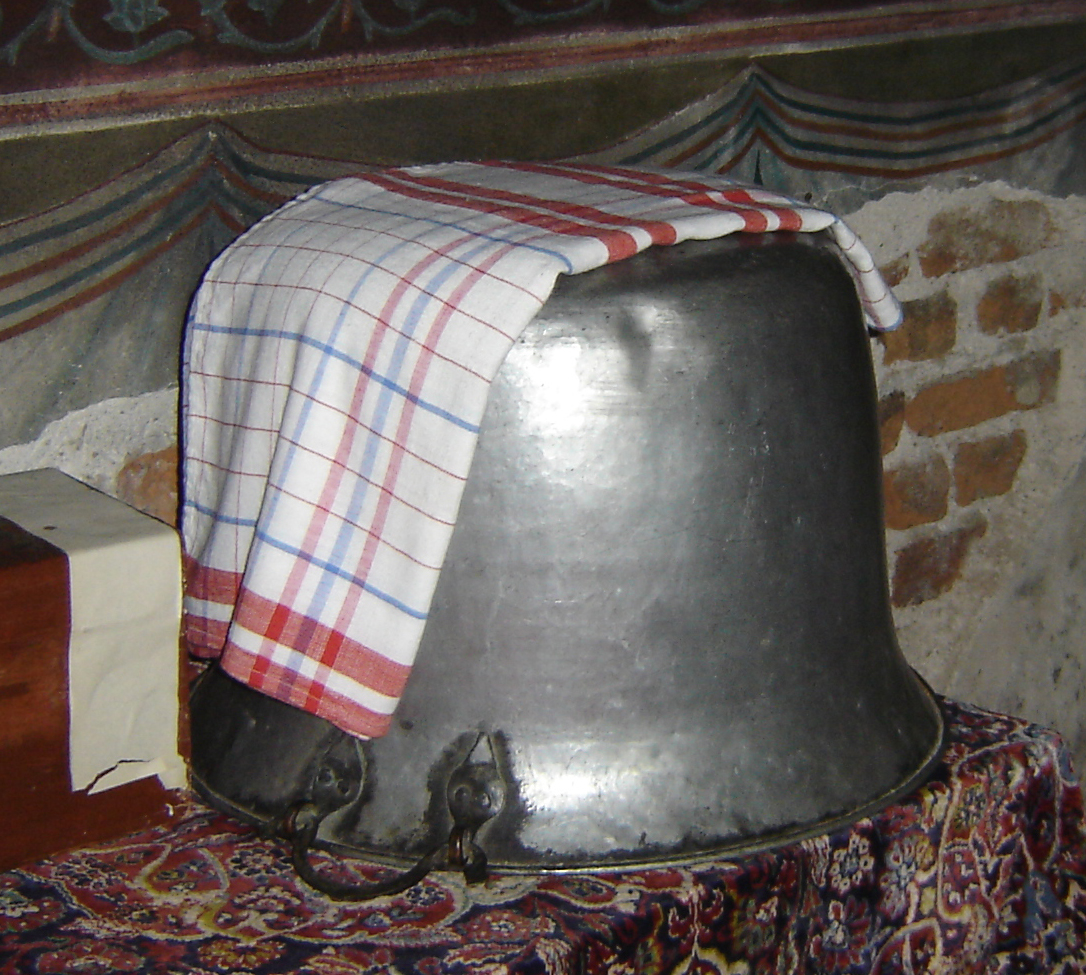
Tinned copper baptismal font from Bulgaria

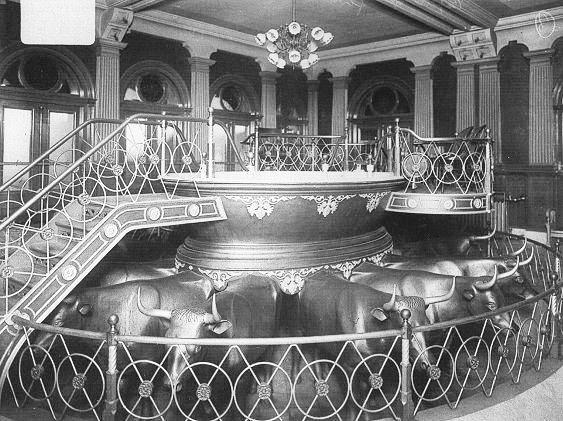
Baptismal font in the Salt Lake Temple of the LDS Church, ca. 1912. The twelve oxen supporting the font represent the Twelve Tribes of Israel.

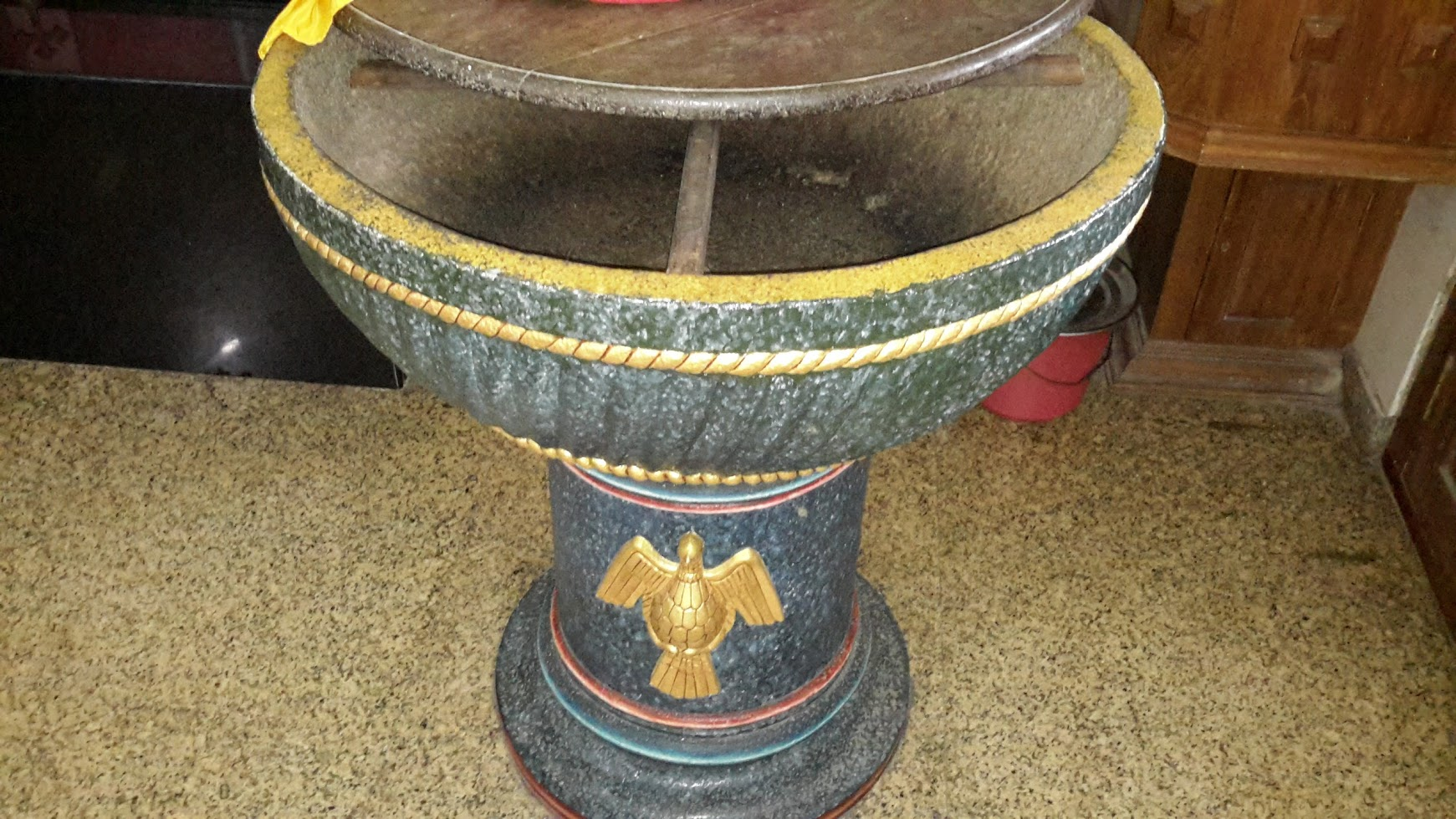
Baptismal font used in Malankara Church from 11th century AD at Mulanthuruthy Marthoman Church

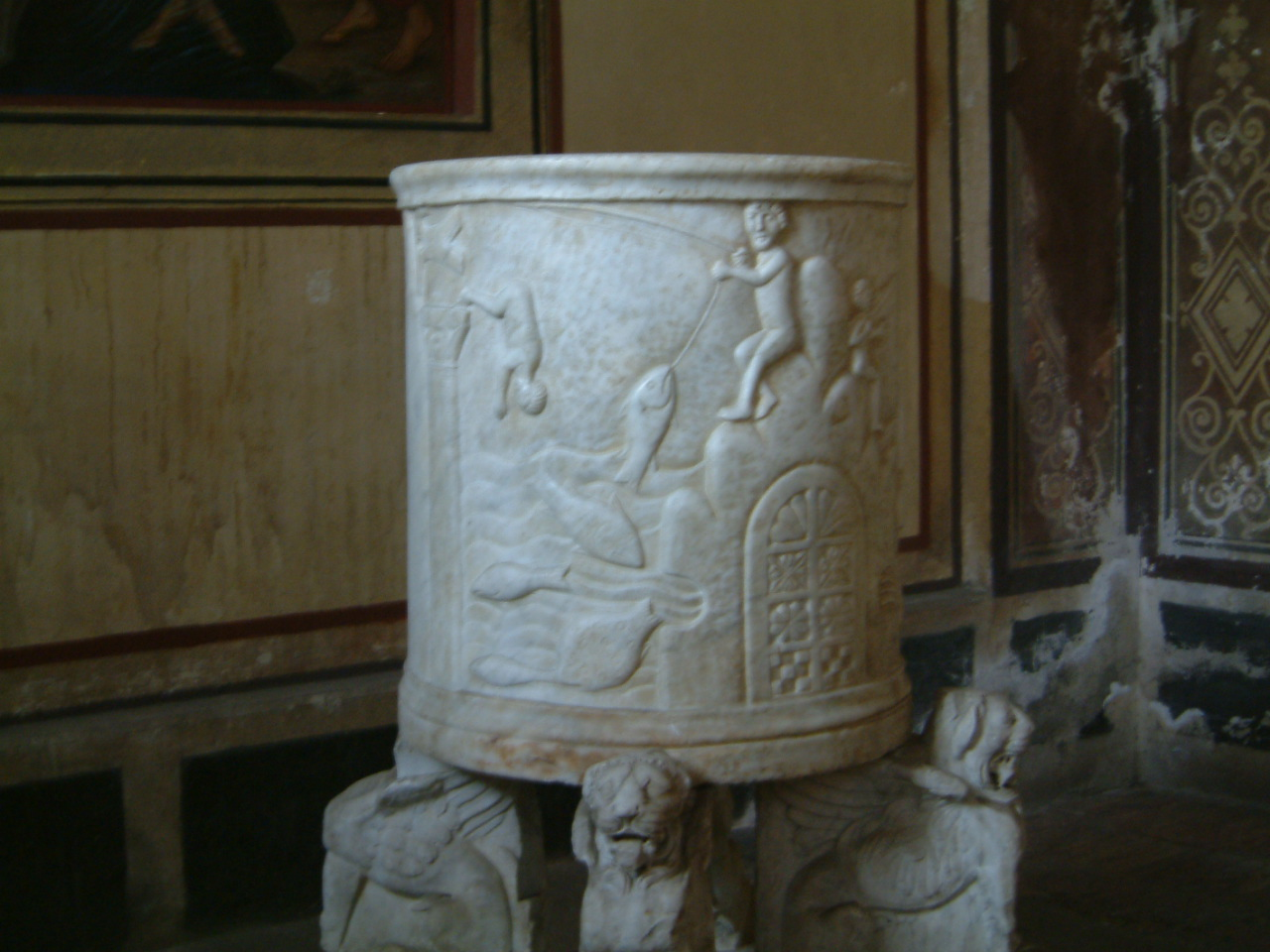
Baptismal Font in the Basilian Monastery of Santa Maria, Grottaferrata near Frascati, Italy

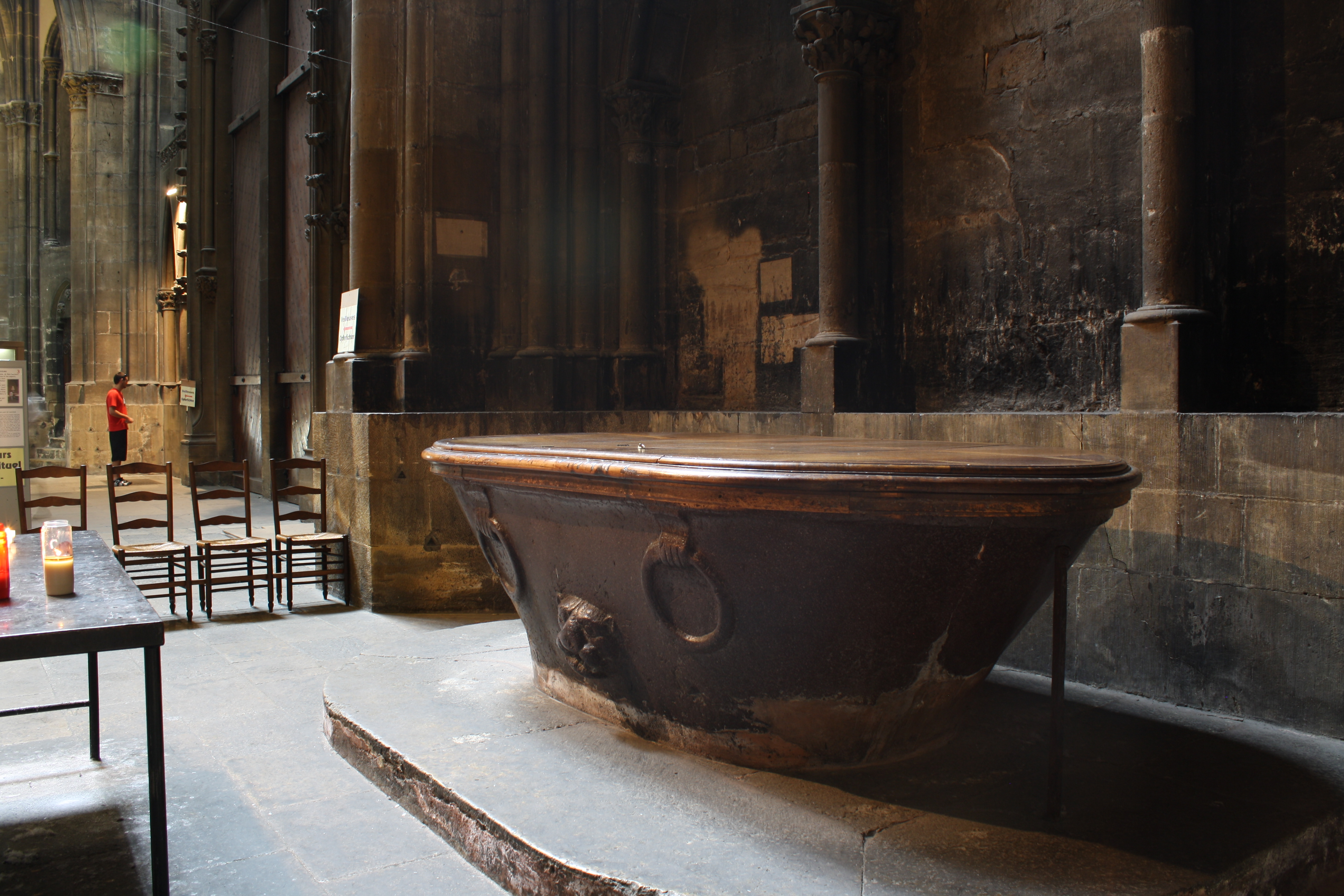
Font of Metz Cathedral in France is an ancient Roman bath converted into a baptismal font

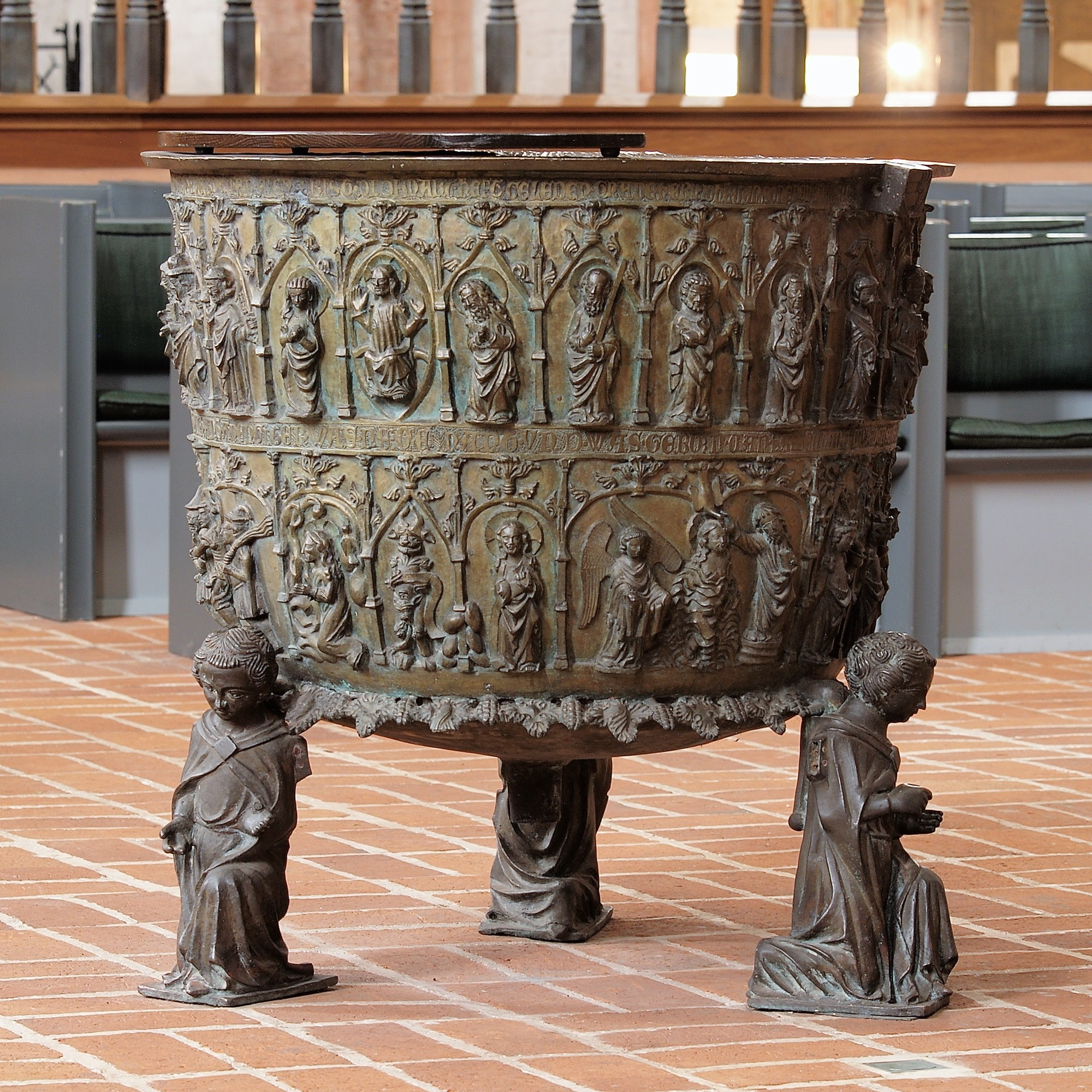
Bronze baptismal font of St. Mary's Church, Lübeck, Germany

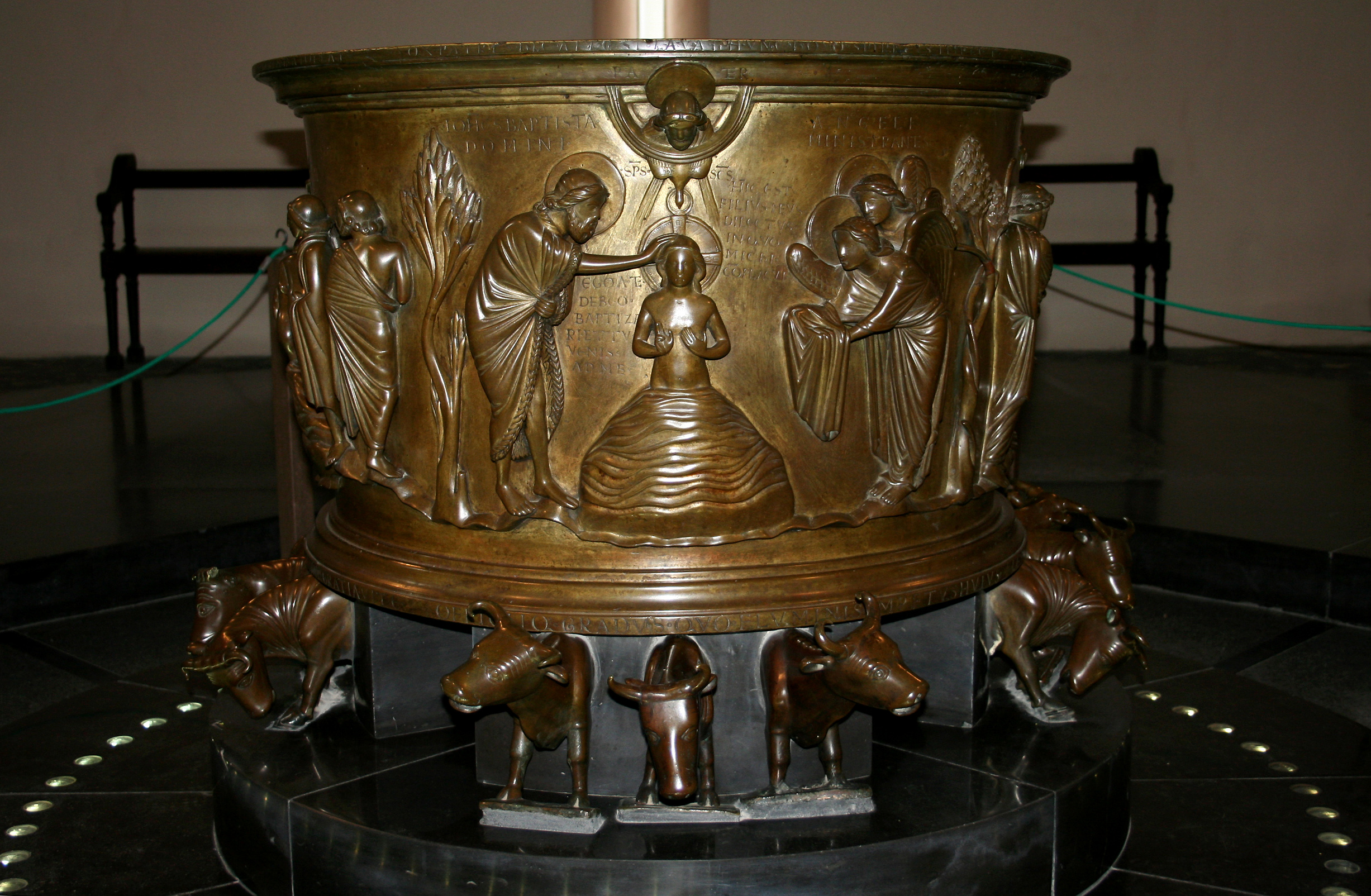
Baptismal font at St Bartholomew's Church, Liège sculpted by Renier de Huy in Liège, Belgium

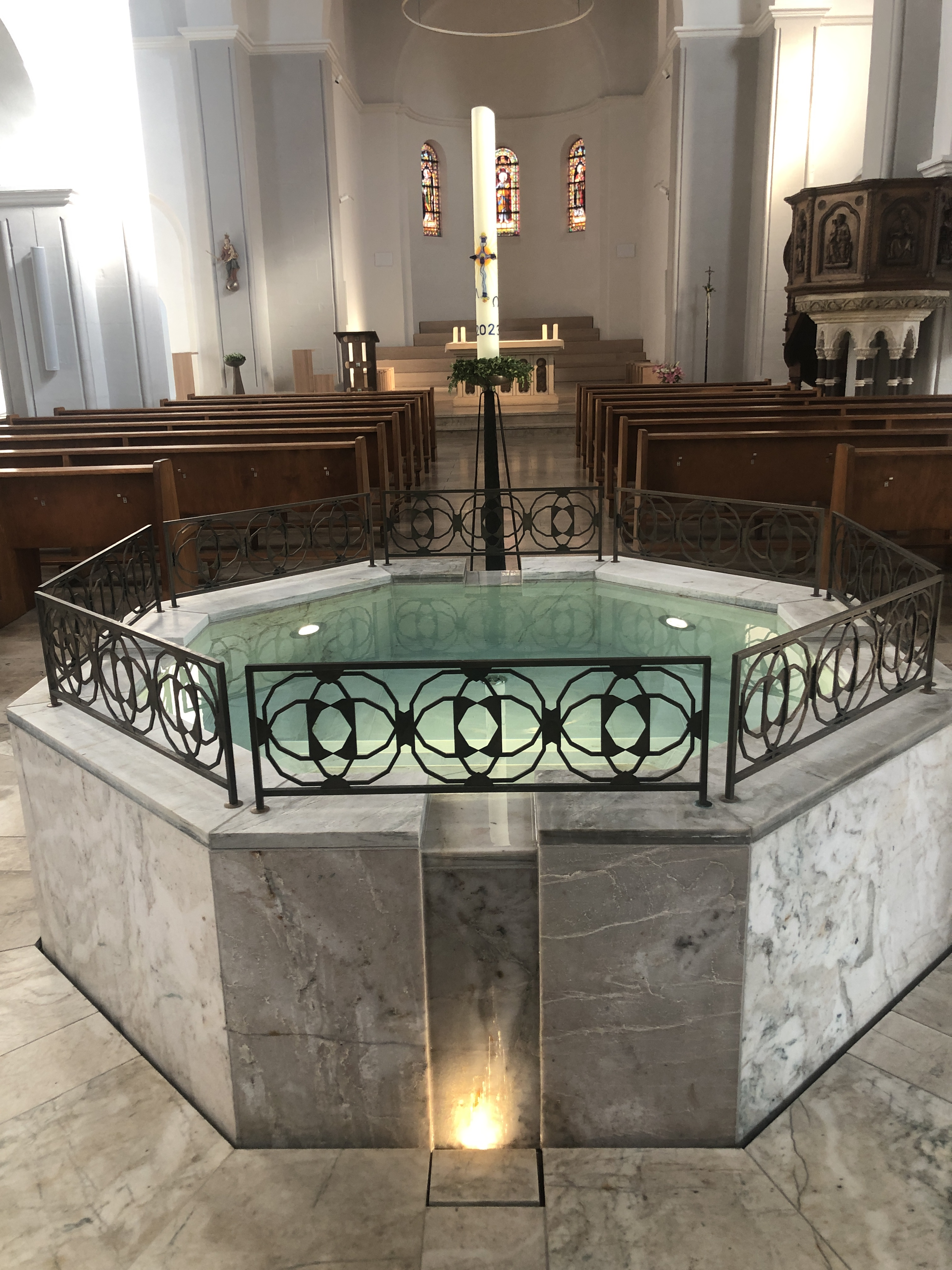
Immersion font of St. Petrus Catholic Church in Wolfenbüttel, Germany

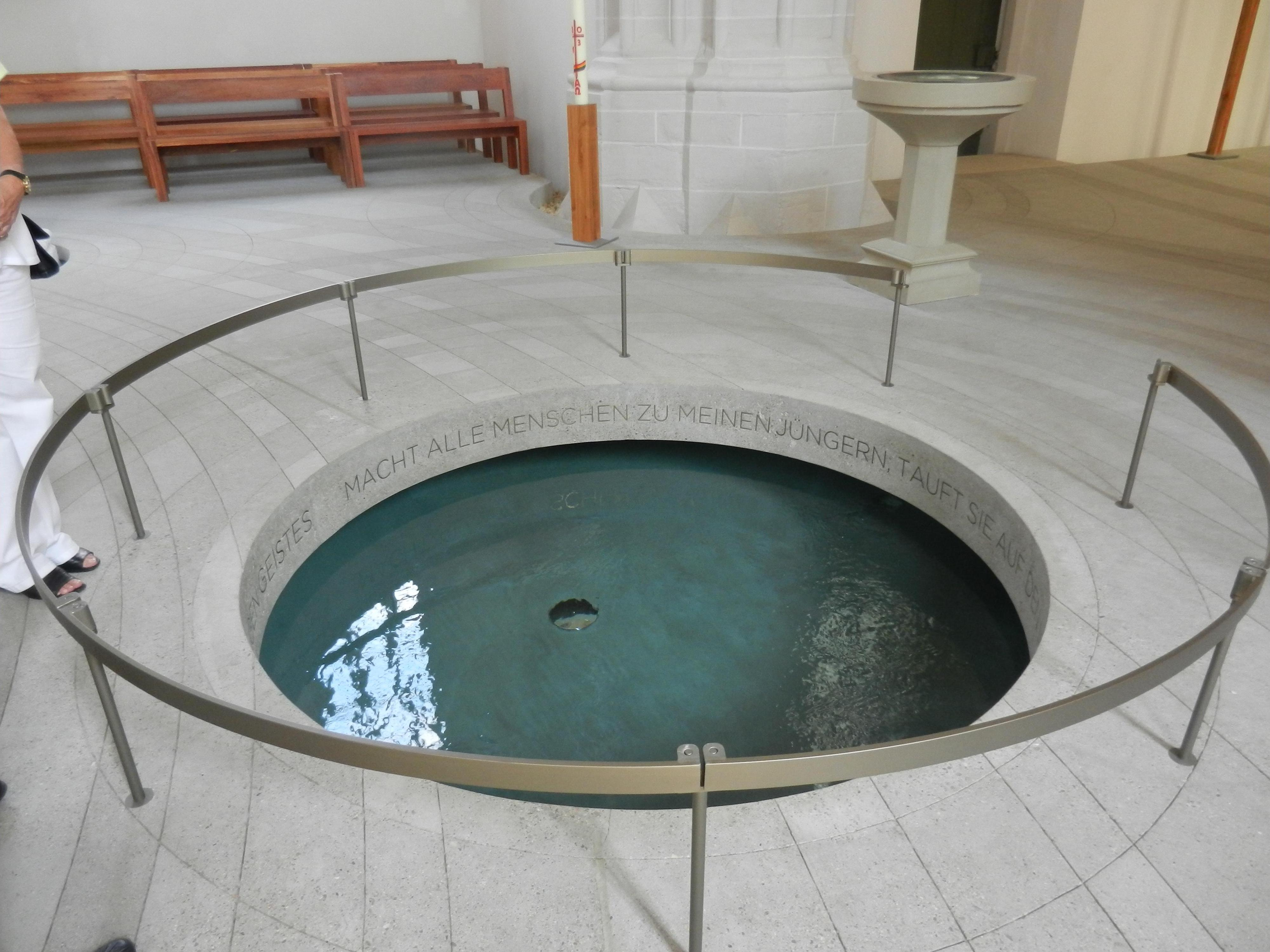
Modern immersion font of Evangelical Lutheran St.-Petri-Pauli-Church in Eisleben, Germany

== See also ==
- Baptistery
- Bronze laver (Temple)
- Mikveh
- Holy water font
- Nipson anomemata me monan opsin
- Church of the priest Félix and baptistry of Kélibia
