= Molten Sea =

Structure described in the Hebrew Bible

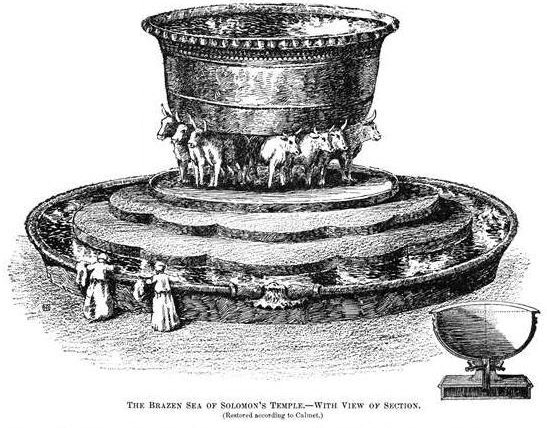
An artist's rendition of the Molten Sea

The Molten Sea or Brazen Sea (ים מוצק yām mūṣāq "cast metal sea") was a large basin in the Temple in Jerusalem made by Solomon for ablution of the priests. It is described in 1 Kings 7:23–26 and 2 Chronicles 4:2–5. It stood in the south-eastern corner of the inner court. According to the Bible it was five cubits high, ten cubits in diameter from brim to brim, and thirty cubits in circumference. The brim was like the rim of a cup or like a lily blossom, and its thickness was a hand breadth", three or four inches. It was placed on the backs of twelve oxen, standing with their faces outward. It was capable of containing two or three thousand baths of water (2 Chronicles 4:5). The fact that it was a wash basin which was too large to enter from above lends to the idea that water would likely have flowed from it down into a subcontainer beneath. The water was originally supplied by the Gibeonites, but was afterwards brought by a conduit from Solomon's Pools. The "molten sea" was made of brass or bronze, which Solomon had taken from the captured cities of Hadarezer, the king of Zobah (1 Chronicles 18:8). Ahaz later removed this laver from the oxen, and placed it on a stone pavement (2 Kings 16:17). It was destroyed by the Chaldeans (2 Kings 25:13).

== In rabbinical literature ==
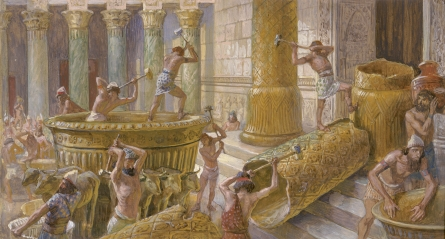
The Brazen Sea is destroyed by the Chaldeans (watercolor, circa 1896–1902 by James Tissot, or followers)

The basin contained water sufficient for two thousand baths. Adding to its Biblical description, according to the Talmud, the laver was not entirely round; the upper two-fifths were round, but the lower three were square.

The symbolism and specific appearance of the brazen sea is described in detail in the Midrash Tadshe. The sea represented the world and the ten ells of diameter corresponded to the ten Sefirot; it was round at the top (according to the Talmud passage above cited), as the heavens are round, and the specific curvature reflected the Hebrew zodiac (Mazzaroth). The depth of the sea was five ells, corresponding to the distance of five hundred years' journey between heaven and earth. The two rows of colocynths (knops) below the rim were symbolic of the sun (greater light) and the moon (lesser light). The band of thirty ells around it corresponded to the Ten Commandments, to the ten words of God at the creation of the world, and to the ten Sefirot: for the world can exist only when the Ten Commandments are observed, and the ten Sefirot as well as the ten words of God were the instruments of the Creation. The twelve oxen on which the sea rested represented the Twelve Tribes of Israel. It contained 2,000 baths (cubic measures), for the world will sustain him who keeps the Torah, which was created 2,000 years before the world.

== The Laver of the Tabernacle ==
In the Priestly Code of Exodus, instead of the Molten Sea is described a bronze laver (basin), which was to rest on a bronze foot (presumably meaning a stand). The text explains that this laver was to be used for the Israelite priests to wash their hands and feet when they entered the sanctuary. This is confirmed in a later part of the Priestly Code, in the passage describing the actual installation of the Tabernacle furniture.

The size and shape of this laver are not mentioned anywhere in the Bible, and nor are those of its stand, unlike the case for the Molten Sea. By contrast, the Temple Menorah is described by the Priestly Code, but not in the description of Solomon's temple. It might therefore be the case that the laver and the candlestick are somehow the same object.

=== Relation to Solomon's platform ===
Solomon is described by the Book of Chronicles as having constructed a special platform in his Temple, for him to use during the opening ceremony. Although it is often assumed that the text describes Solomon as standing on this platform, the text could equally be read stood next to.

This platform is literally described by the Masoretic Text as a laver (Hebrew: kiyyor), and as with the Priestly Code's laver, there is only one platform, and it is placed in the centre of the outer court. The Septuagint calls it a base, and the size of the brazen platform is the same as that of each base for the ten brazen lavers.

It is therefore quite possible that the account of this platform in the Book of Chronicles is actually an account of a laver corresponding to the laver of the Priestly Code.

== Latter-day Saint interpretation ==
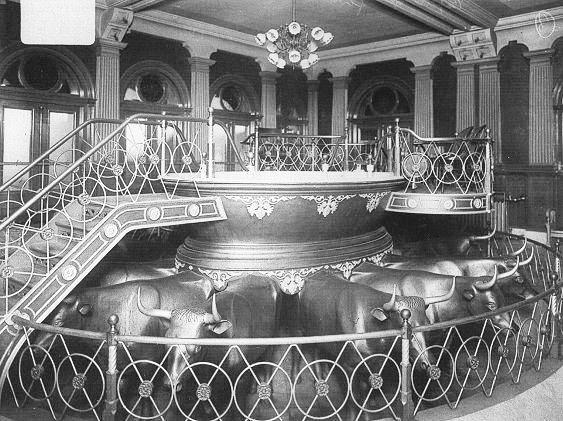
Baptismal font in the Salt Lake Temple, circa 1912, where baptisms for the dead are performed.

Members of the Church of Jesus Christ of Latter-day Saints (LDS Church) believe that the molten sea in Solomon's Temple was a baptismal font, and that someone removed portions of the Hebrew Bible that referred to Tevilah (baptism). As taught by church leader Bruce R. McConkie:

In Solomon's Temple a large molten sea of brass was placed on the backs of 12 brazen oxen, these oxen being symbolical of the 12 tribes of Israel. This brazen sea was used for performing baptisms for the living. There were no baptisms for the dead until after the resurrection of Christ.

It must be remembered that all direct and plain references to baptism have been deleted from the Old Testament (1 Nephi 13) and that the word baptize is of Greek origin. Some equivalent word, such as wash, would have been used by the Hebrew peoples. In describing the molten sea the Old Testament record says, "The sea was for the priests to wash in." (2 Chron 4:2–6). This is tantamount to saying that the priests performed baptisms in it.

Every temple of the LDS Church contains a baptismal font on twelve oxen which is modeled after the molten sea. The church performs baptisms for the dead in these fonts.

== Approximation of π ==
The biblical description that the bowl has a diameter of 10 cubits and a circumference of 30 cubits suggest that in the construction of the basin, π was approximated with the integer value 3. This is consistent with the practice in Babylonian mathematics at the time (6th century BC), but it has given rise to debate within rabbinical Judaism from an early period due to the concern that the biblical text might here be inaccurate.

Rabbi Nehemiah in the 2nd century argued that the text is not claiming that π equals 3, but that instead the Hebrews measured the diameter from the outside edge of the rim of the bowl, while the circumference was measured from under the rim, since it cannot be measured with a cord along the outside edge of the rim. After accounting for the width of the brim—"about an hand breadth"—this results in a ratio closer to the true value of π. Taking a cubit to be about 18 inches (46 cm) and a handbreadth to be about 4 inches (10 cm), the ratio of the described dimensions of the bowl differs from π by less than 1%.

Rabbi Max Munk pointed to the fact that the word for measuring line in the respective verses (1 Kings 7:23, 2 Chronicles 4:2) is written in two different ways, as קוה and קו. That hints to two different measures. If the Hebrew letters are read as numbers, the first form of the word for measuring line adds to 111 and the second form to 106. The relation, i.e. the quotient of these two measuring tapes, is 1.0472. And if this number, the relation of these two measuring tapes, is multiplied with Solomon's simple pi of 3, the result reads: 3.1416, the value of π accurate to four digits.

== See also ==
- Approximations of π
- Archaeology of Israel
