= Bronze laver =

Biblical ritual object for washing the priests' hands and feet

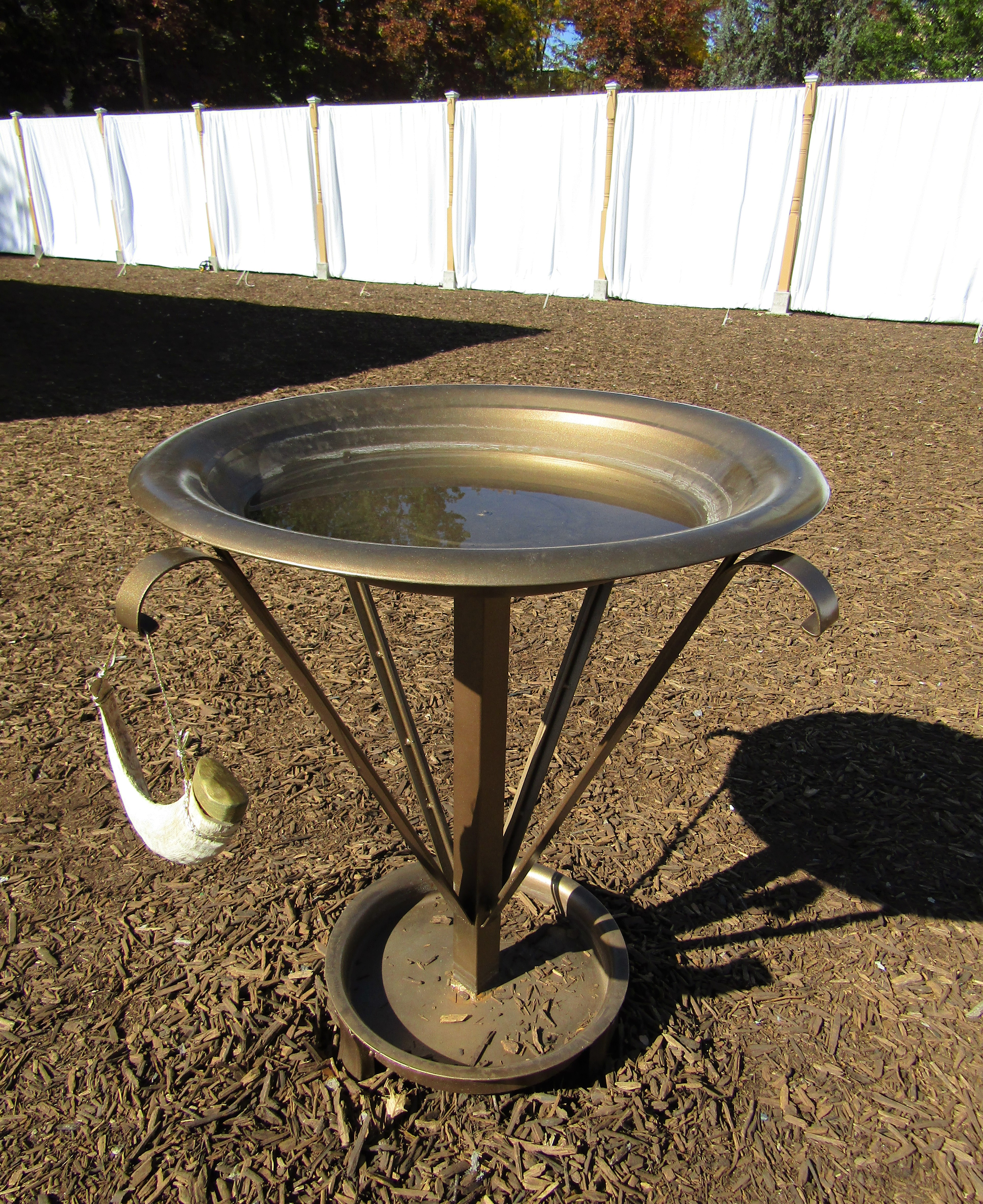
Recreation of the bronze laver at Brigham Young University

The laver was an instrument in the Tabernacle and Temples in Jerusalem that was used by the priests to wash their hands and feet. All lavers were made of bronze and placed next to the Altar of Burnt Offering.

== Tabernacle laver ==
The instructions given to Moses in the Book of Exodus included the creation of a bronze laver (Hebrew: כיור נחשת kîyōr nəḥōšeṯ), to be sited outside the Tabernacle of Meeting, between the Tabernacle door and the Altar of Burnt Offering, for Aaron, his sons and their successors as priests to wash their hands and their feet before making a sacrifice.

Both the laver and its base were to be made of bronze. Bronze mirrors supplied by the Israelite women who served at the Tabernacle door were used to make the laver and its base, and they were then anointed with holy oil along with the Tabernacle, all its furnishings and the priests.

== First Temple lavers ==
Ten bronze lavers were used in Solomon's Temple, alongside a Molten Sea described in 1 Kings 7:23–26 and 2 Chronicles 4:2–5.

== See also ==
- Molten Sea § The Laver of the Tabernacle
- Handwashing in Judaism
