= Bronze laver (Temple) =

Ritual vessels in the Temple of Solomon

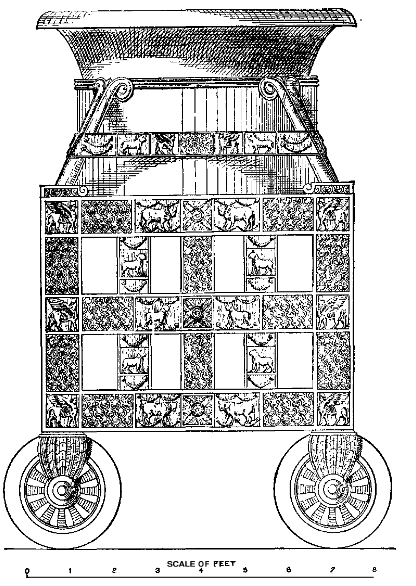
Reconstruction of a Brazen Laver, based on parallels in other nearby cultures

The ten Brazen Lavers were bronze lavers used in the Temple of Solomon, in addition to the larger Molten Sea, according to the Book of Kings.

All this passage explains about the lavers themselves is their size, and that they were made from bronze. The mediaeval Masoretic Text claims that they were four cubits in diameter, and that they had a cubic capacity of forty baths, but the earlier writer Flavius Josephus claims that four cubits was the size of the radius, making the capacity even larger. Even with the masoretic text's measurements, these lavers would be so large that if one was to be filled with water, the water alone would weigh 14 long tons.

== The 'bases' ==
Much greater detail is elaborated for the description of the supporting bases (Hebrew: Mekonoth) for the lavers. In the masoretic text, these are claimed to be four cubits long, four cubits wide, and three cubits high, but the older Septuagint, and Josephus, both instead give the size as five cubits long, five cubits wide, and six cubits high.

These bases are described as being made from two components; in the Masoretic Text, these are described by the Hebrew terms misgeroth and shelabbim; the Septuagint uses the Greek terms sygkleiston and hexechomena to describe them. The meaning of these words is unfortunately somewhat uncertain, although it is suspected that the shelabbim/hexechomena were the main part, onto which the misgeroth/sygkleiston were affixed (hence some English translations render these words into side panels and uprights, or borders and frames). The bible describes the misgeroth/sygkleiston as being decorated by lions, oxen, and cherubim.

Each base is described as resting on a solid brass wheels, each 1.5 cubits in diameter. The axles for these wheels are described as being held to the base by hands (Hebrew: yadoth), which were extensions of the base itself.

According to a later passage from the books of kings, King Ahaz dismantled these bases, and removed the misgeroth/sygleiston; it doesn't mention whether he did anything to the lavers themselves, but if they remained they would presumably have been situated significantly lower than they were before. However, an even later passage states that Nebuchadnezzar's army dismantled the bases.

== Purpose ==
The ten lavers are described by the bible as being placed around the Temple building itself, five on the north side and the other five on the south. They were used for washing the hands and feet of the priests before doing ritual service (Exodus 30:18-21). This is a redundant act which was the purpose of the cast sea, thus the concluding statement of Josephus, saying that these laverns were for cleansing the entrails of the sacrificed animals, and their feet.

=== Parallels in other nearby cultures ===
In the late 19th century, bronze chariots were discovered in Cyprus which had a remarkable similarity to the biblical description of the bases of the lavers. This has provided some clarification of the nature of misgeroth/sygleiston, and shelabbim/hexechomena, as well as explaining the design of the mouths of the lavers themselves (see illustration of the reconstruction, above).
