= Community-led total sanitation =

Approach to improve sanitation and hygiene practices, mainly in developing countries

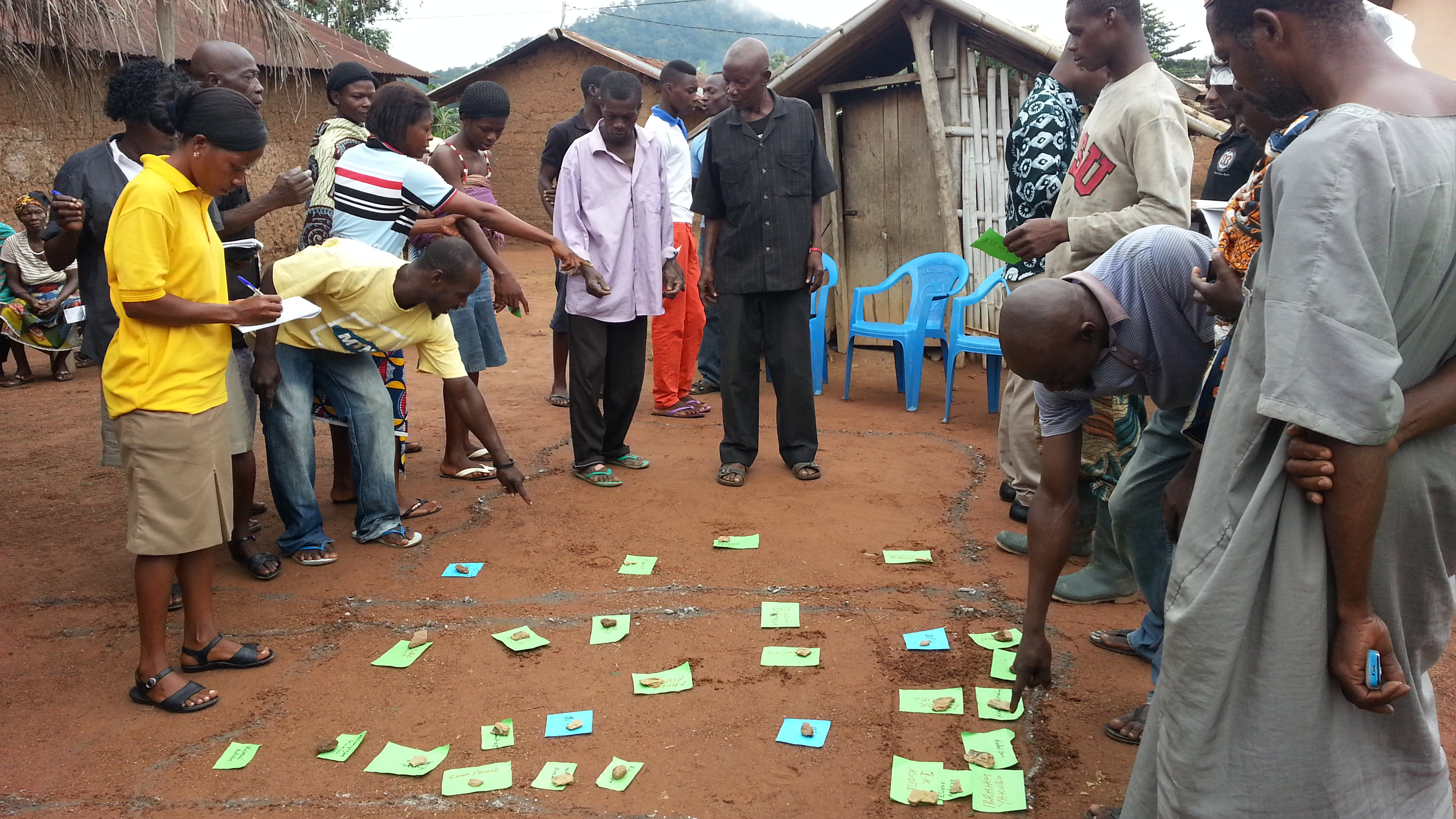
CLTS triggering process: Community members in Ghana are drawing a map of open defecation for their community.

Community-led total sanitation (CLTS) is a participatory approach used primarily in developing countries to improve sanitation and hygiene practices within communities. CLTS aims to achieve behavior change with a "trigger" that leads to spontaneous and long-term abandonment of open defecation practices, thereby improving community sanitation and overall health. The term "triggering" is central to the CLTS process. It refers to methods of igniting community interest in ending open defecation, usually by building simple toilets such as pit latrines. The effect of CLTS is two-fold: actions that increase self-respect and pride in one's community and actions that promote shame and disgust about one's open defecation behaviors. CLTS takes an approach to rural sanitation that works without hardware subsidies by facilitating communities to acknowledge the problem of open defecation, taking collective action to become "open defecation free," and improve sanitation.

The concept was developed around 2000 by Kamal Kar for rural areas in Bangladesh. CLTS became an established approach around 2011. Local governments may reward communities by certifying them with "open defecation free" (ODF) status. The original concept of CLTS purposefully did not include subsidies for toilet installations, as they might hinder the process.

CLTS is practiced in at least 53 countries and has been adapted to the urban context. It has also been applied to post-emergency and fragile states settings.

Challenges associated with CLTS include the risk of human rights infringements within communities, low standards for toilets, and concerns about usage rates in the long term. CLTS is, in principle, compatible with a human rights-based approach to sanitation, but there are examples of bad practices in the name of CLTS. Rigorous coaching of CLTS practitioners, government public health staff, and local leaders on issues such as stigma, awareness of social norms, and pre-existing inequalities are important. Disadvantaged people should benefit from CLTS programs as effectively, as those who are not disadvantaged.

== Definitions ==
Open defecation is the practice of defecating out in the open rather than using a toilet or other receptacle.

"Open defecation free" (ODF) is a central term for community-led total sanitation (CLTS) programs. It primarily means the eradication of open defecation in the entire community. However, ODF can also include additional criteria, such as:

- Household latrines or toilets are hygienic, provide the safe containment of feces, offer privacy, a roof to protect the user, and have a lid to cover the hole or a water seal for toilets.
- All household and community members use these latrines or toilets.
- A handwashing facility with water, soap, or ash is nearby and used regularly.

Even more stringent criteria which may be required before a community is awarded "ODF status" might include:

- Safe drinking water and storage.
- Food hygiene.
- Greywater disposal.
- Solid waste management.
- Provision of toilets for schools, markets, clinics, or visitors to the community.

== Aims and rationale ==
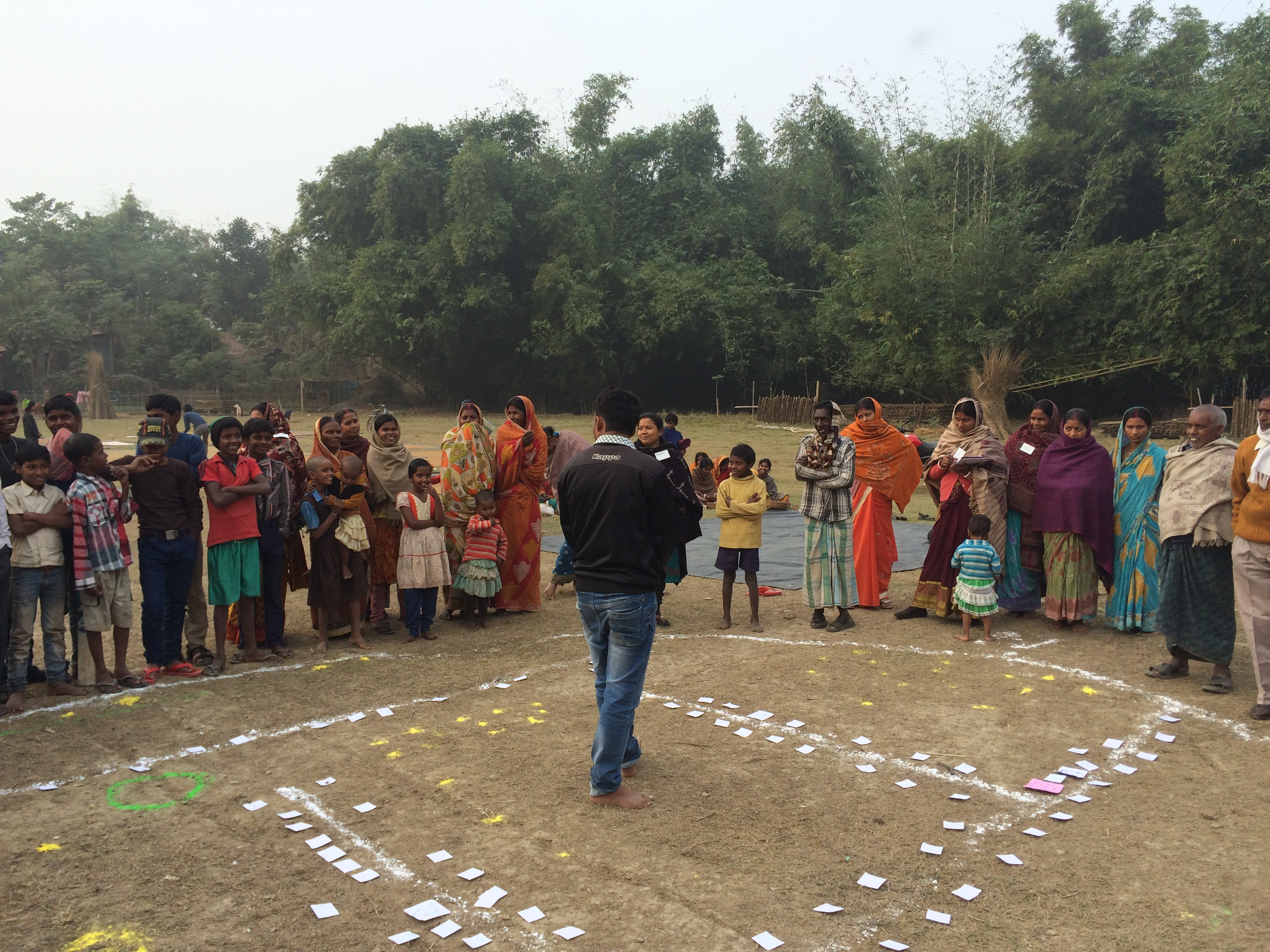
A facilitator and the community during a triggering in Malda District, West Bengal, India

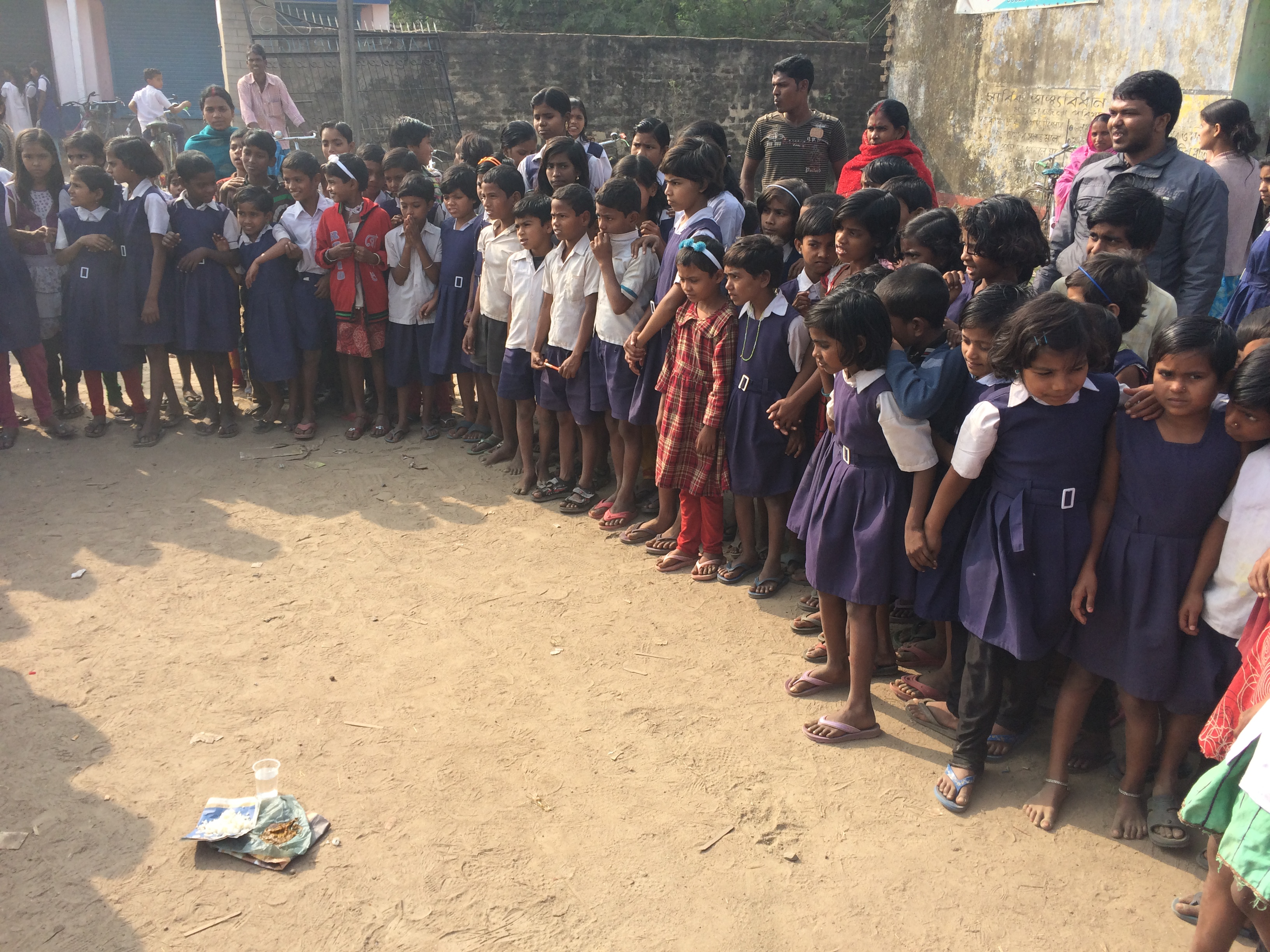
School-led total sanitation "triggering" event: These school children in West Bengal, India are looking at a glass of water and fresh feces. Flies will pass from the water to the feces and back, demonstrating how water can get polluted with pathogens.

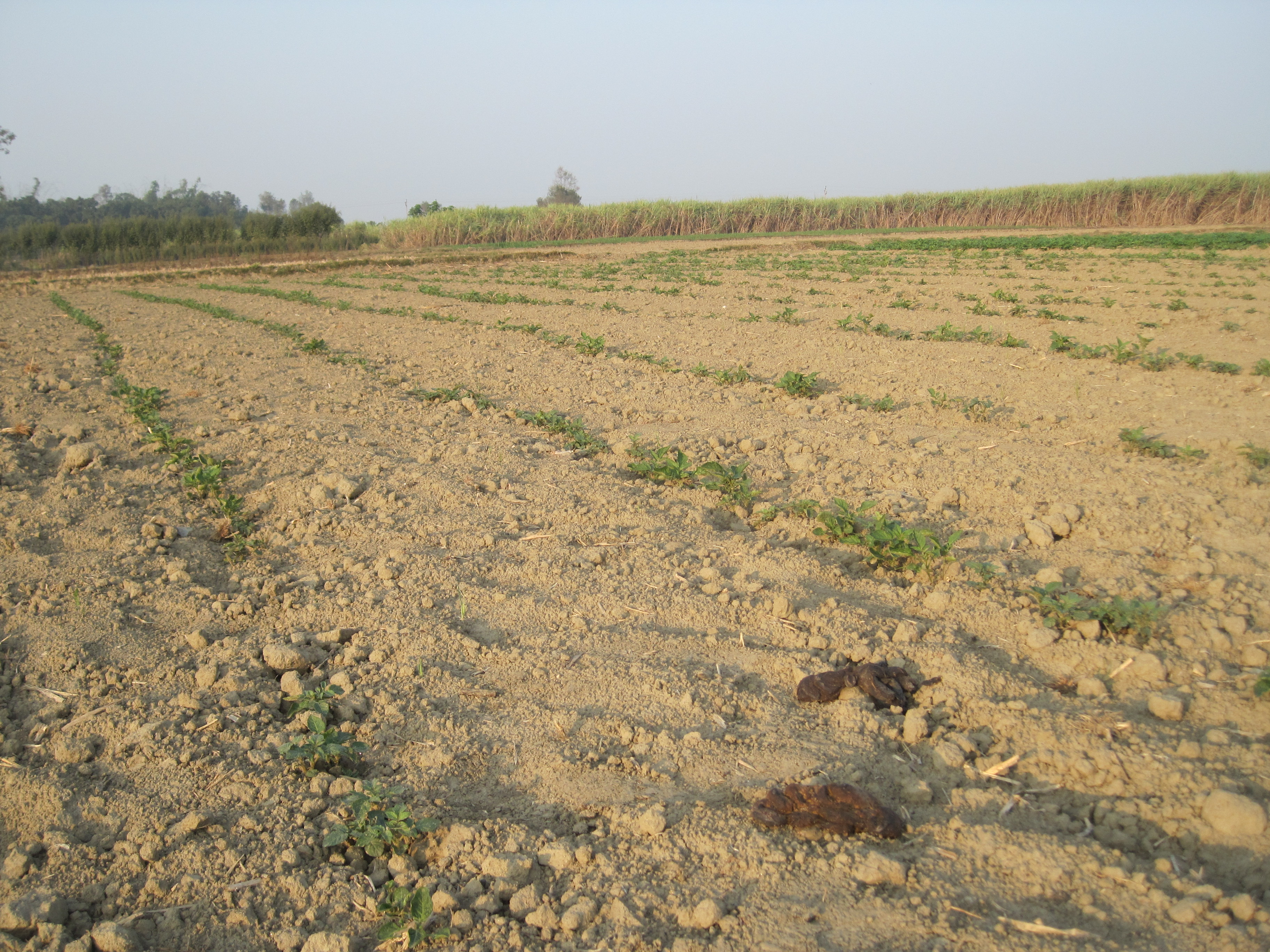
One of the goals of CLTS is to stop open defecation.

CLTS focuses on community-wide behavioral change rather than merely toilet construction. The process aims to spread awareness about the issues associated with open defecation. It highlights the fact that a community is put at risk of disease even if just a minority continues defecating in the open. CLTS uses community-led methods, such as participatory mapping and analyzing pathways between feces and the mouth (fecal-oral transmission of disease), as a means of teaching the risks associated with open defecation.

The concept originally focused on provoking shame and disgust about open defecation. It also involved actions leading to increased self-respect and pride in one's community. With time, CLTS evolved away from provoking negative emotions to educating people about how open defecation increases the risk of disease. Currently, CLTS-triggering events focus more on promoting self-respect and pride.

CLTS prioritizes personal responsibility and low-cost solutions. Rather than facilitating improved sanitation only to selected households, CLTS aims to eliminate open defecation within a community by making the entire community acknowledge the associated severe health impacts. CLTS employs individual pressure to enforce sanitation principles such as using sanitary toilets, washing hands, and practicing good hygiene. To introduce sanitation principles, low-cost toilets financed by each household are built with local materials.

=== Use or non-use of subsidies ===
Before CLTS, most traditional sanitation programs relied on subsidies to construct latrines and perform hygiene education. Under this framework, the subsidized facilities were expensive and often did not reach all community members. In addition, the subsidies may have reduced the feeling of personal responsibility for the toilets.

The original concept of CLTS did not include subsidies for toilets. CLTS proponents at that time believed that provoking behavior change in the people alone would be sufficient to lead them to take ownership of their sanitation situation, including paying for and constructing their toilets. This was not always the case.

Kamal Kar and Robert Chambers stated in their 2008 CLTS Handbook:

It is fundamental that CLTS involves no individual household hardware subsidy and does not prescribe latrine models.

— Kamal Kar, Robert Chambers, CLTS Foundation Handbook, 2008 page 8

In time, NGOs and governments began to see the value of the approach and ran their schemes in various countries, some with less aversion to subsidies than Kamal Kar.

== Phases ==
=== Pre-triggering ===
Pre-triggering identifies which communities are suitable for CLTS intervention. This involves visits and criteria to identify communities likely to respond well to triggering. During pre-triggering, facilitators introduce themselves to community members and begin to build a relationship.

=== Triggering ===
"Triggering" is a technique used to propel people into taking action and often takes place over a day with a team of facilitators. The team visits a community identified as practicing open defecation and encourages villagers to become aware of their sanitation situation. This aims to cause disgust in participants, and the facilitators help participants to plan appropriate sanitation facilities.

Using the term "shit" (or other locally used crude words) at triggering events or presentations – rather than feces or excreta – is a deliberate aspect of the CLTS approach, as it is meant to be a practical, straightforward approach rather than a theoretical, academic conversation.

The "CLTS Handbook" from 2008 states there is no "one way" of triggering in CLTS. A rough sequence of steps is given in this handbook which could be followed. Facilitators are encouraged to modify and change activities depending on the local situation.

The UNICEF manual approved for the use of CLTS in Sierra Leone suggests the following steps for the triggering process:

- Visit the community, to learn about its sanitation situation
- Facilitate "Kaka Mapping" – drawing a map of important locations in the village, then adding common sites for defecation by asking the community
- Pretend to leave the community because you cannot believe how bad defecation sites are, which will encourage the community to offer to show you, especially children
- Facilitate a "Walk of Shame" to sites with frequent open defecation
- Collect a piece of feces in a bag
- Put feces on the ground where all present can see it, and discuss how flies move between food and feces
- Wait for the people's shock that they are indirectly eating each other's feces
- Put some feces into a water bottle and ask if anyone would drink it
- Calculate how much feces is produced each day and ask where it goes
- Ignition (see below)
- Wait for the emergence of "natural" leaders to work with to develop a plan of action.

The "ignition" phase occurs when the community becomes convinced that there is a real sanitation problem and is motivated to do something about it. Natural leaders are community members engaged in the process and able to drive change.

The goal of triggering is to let people see the problem first-hand and evoke disgust. However, it has been reported that communities that respond favorably tend to be motivated more by improved health, dignity, and pride than by shame or disgust.

=== Post-triggering ===
After a positive response to the ignition phase, NGO facilitators work with communities to deliver sanitation services by providing information and guidance relevant to the local situation.

Many challenges occur in the post-triggering phase. These are mainly related to the supply of durable and affordable latrine hardware and technical support for their construction. Toilet owners may need advice on upgrading and improving sanitation and handwashing facilities using local materials.

== Applications and scale ==
Millions of people worldwide have benefited from CLTS, which has reduced open defecation and increased latrine coverage in many rural communities. Practitioners have declared many villages as "ODF villages", where ODF stands for "open defecation free".

CLTS is practiced in at least 53 countries. CLTS has spread throughout Bangladesh and to many other Asian and African countries with financial support from the Water and Sanitation Program of the World Bank, DFID, Plan International, WaterAid, CARE, UNICEF and SNV. Large INGOs and many national NGOs have also been involved. Many governments have in the meantime initiated CLTS processes or made it a matter of national policy.

The idea of CLTS has grown beyond its founder and is now often being run in slightly different ways in different countries, e.g. in India, Pakistan, Philippines, Nepal, Sierra Leone and Zambia. Non-governmental organizations (NGOs) were often in the lead when CLTS was first introduced in a country. India was an exception – there, the government led the somewhat similar "Total Sanitation Campaign" which has been turned into the "Clean India Mission" or Swachh Bharat Abhiyan in 2014.

The idea of CLTS has many supporters around the world, with Robert Chambers, co-writer of the CLTS Foundation Handbook, describing it this way:

"We have so many "revolutions" in development that only last a year or two and then fade into history. But this one is different. In all the years I have worked in development this is as thrilling and transformative as anything I have been involved in."

— Robert Chambers from Institute of Development Studies, The Guardian, 30 May 2011

The Institute of Development Studies (IDS) coordinated research programme on CLTS since 2007 and regards it as a "radically different approach to rural sanitation in developing countries which has shown promising successes where traditional rural sanitation programmers have failed".

Today there are many NGOs and research institutes with an interest in CLTS, including, for example, the CLTS Knowledge Hub of the Institute of Development Studies, the CLTS Foundation led by Kamal Kar, The World Bank, WaterAid, Plan USA and the Water Institute at UNC, SNV from the Netherlands and UNICEF.

=== Applications to urban situations, schools, and other settings ===
Since about 2016, CLTS has been adapted to the urban context. For example, in Kenya, the NGOs Plan and Practical Action have implemented a form of urban CLTS. CLTS has also been used in schools and the surrounding communities, which is referred to as "school-led total sanitation". The school children act as messengers of change to households.

CLTS has also been applied to post-emergency and fragile state settings. There has been some experience with this in Haiti, Afghanistan, Pakistan, Philippines and Indonesia. In 2014, UNICEF reported positive outcomes with CLTS in fragile and insecure contexts, namely in Somalia and South Sudan.

People who are disadvantaged should benefit from CLTS programmers as effectively as those who are not disadvantaged. This is referred to as equality and non-discrimination (EQND).

== Effectiveness ==
To be successful in the longer term, CLTS should be treated as part of a larger WASH (water, sanitation, and hygiene) strategy rather than as a singular solution to changing behavior.

A systematic review of 200 studies concluded in 2018 that the evidence base on CLTS effectiveness is still weak. Because of this, practitioners, policymakers, and program managers have limited evidence to support their decisions.

There is currently a lack of scientific review about the effectiveness of CLTS, although this has been changing since 2015. A study in 2012 reviewed reports by NGOs and practitioners and found that there was little review of the impact of local "natural" leaders, that anecdotes were used without assessing impacts, and that claims were made without supporting evidence. It concluded that these kinds of reports focus on the 'triggering' stage of CTLS instead of the measurable outcomes. A peer-reviewed article considered the sustainability of CLTS in the longer term: It found that there was little monitoring or evaluation of the impacts of CLTS, even though large international organizations were involved in funding the process.

Reviews about the effectiveness of CLTS in eliminating open defecation, reducing diarrhea and other gastrointestinal diseases, and decreasing stunting in children are currently underway. In some cases, CLTS has been compared with India's Total Sanitation Campaign (TSC) when assessing its effectiveness. However, this comparison may be invalid, as the presence of subsidies in the TSC process makes a substantial difference.

One small study compared different CLTS programs. Participants from NGOs involved in delivering CLTS reported that although they included some of the activities described in the guidance materials, they often omitted some and included others depending on the local situation. Some reported that subsidies were included, and some offered specific design and construction options.

A cluster-randomized controlled trial in rural Mali conducted from 2011 to 2013 found that CLTS with no monetary subsidies did not affect diarrhea frequency, but corresponded with increased child growth (thereby reducing stunting), particularly in children under two years of age.

== Challenges and difficulties ==
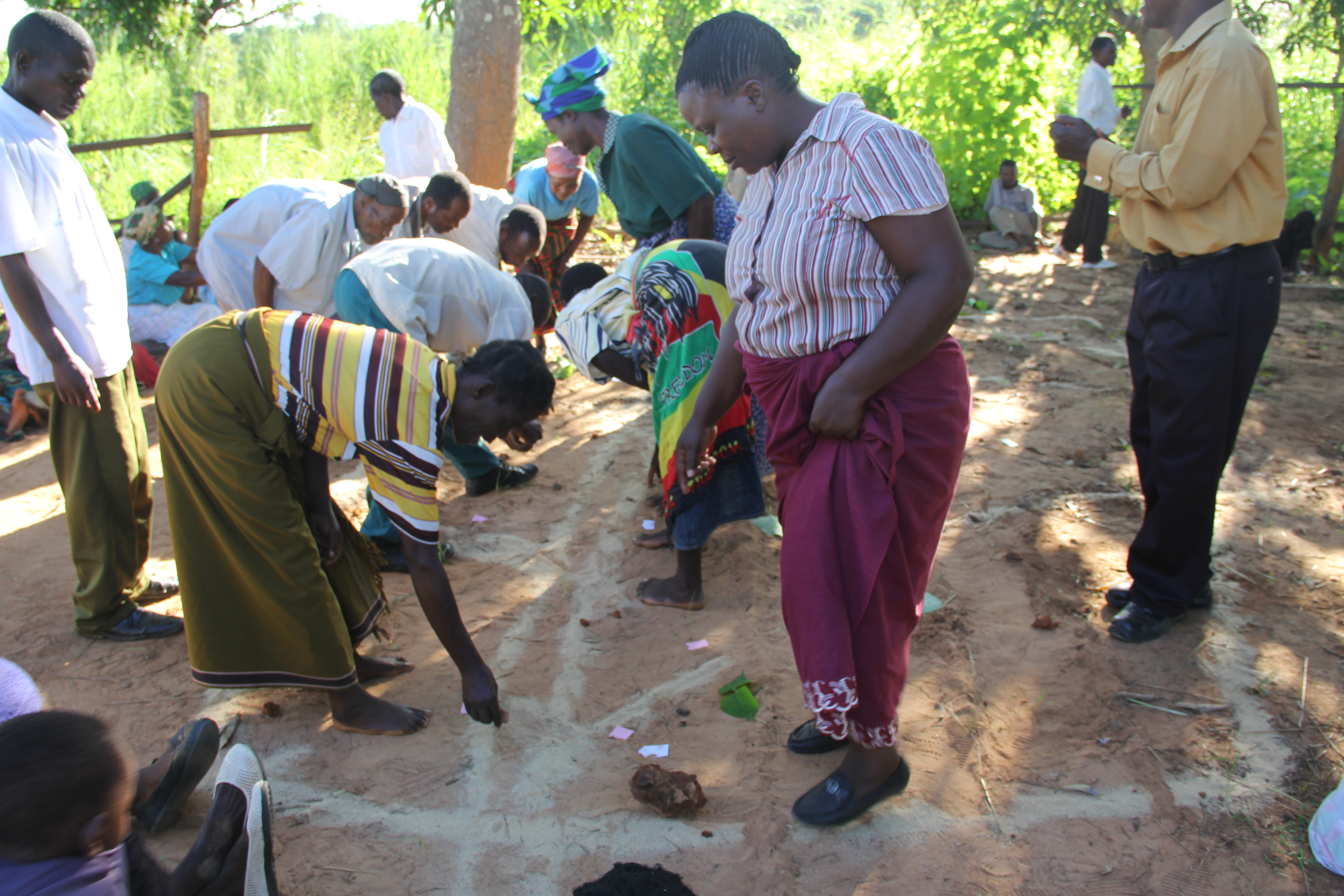
A health worker (centre) gets villagers to draw a map of the area, showing the main features like the road and the river (a village near Lake Malawi, Malawi).

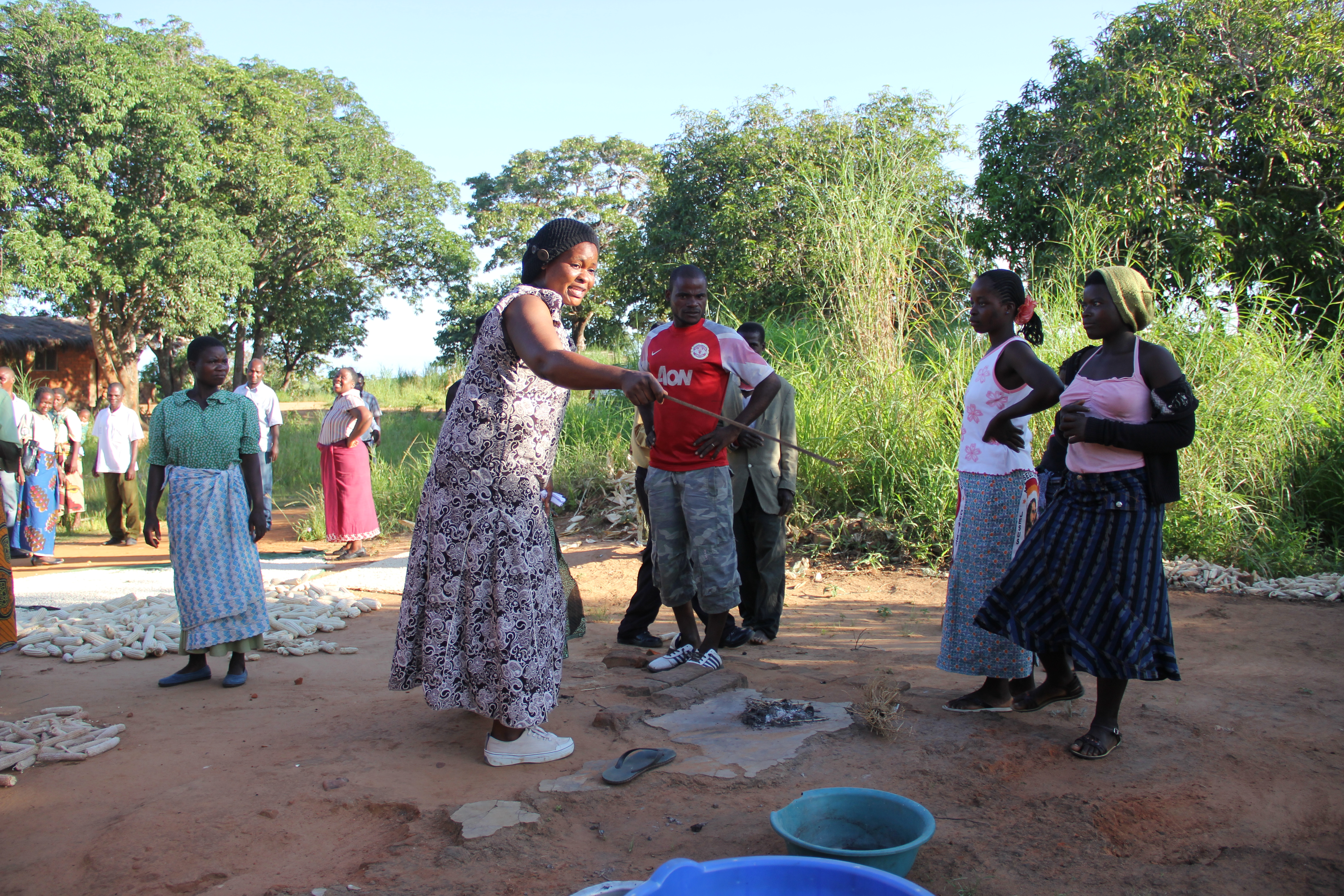
Villagers go to the place where meals are prepared to observe how flies are attracted to human feces and carry diseases by landing on the food (a village near Lake Malawi, Malawi).

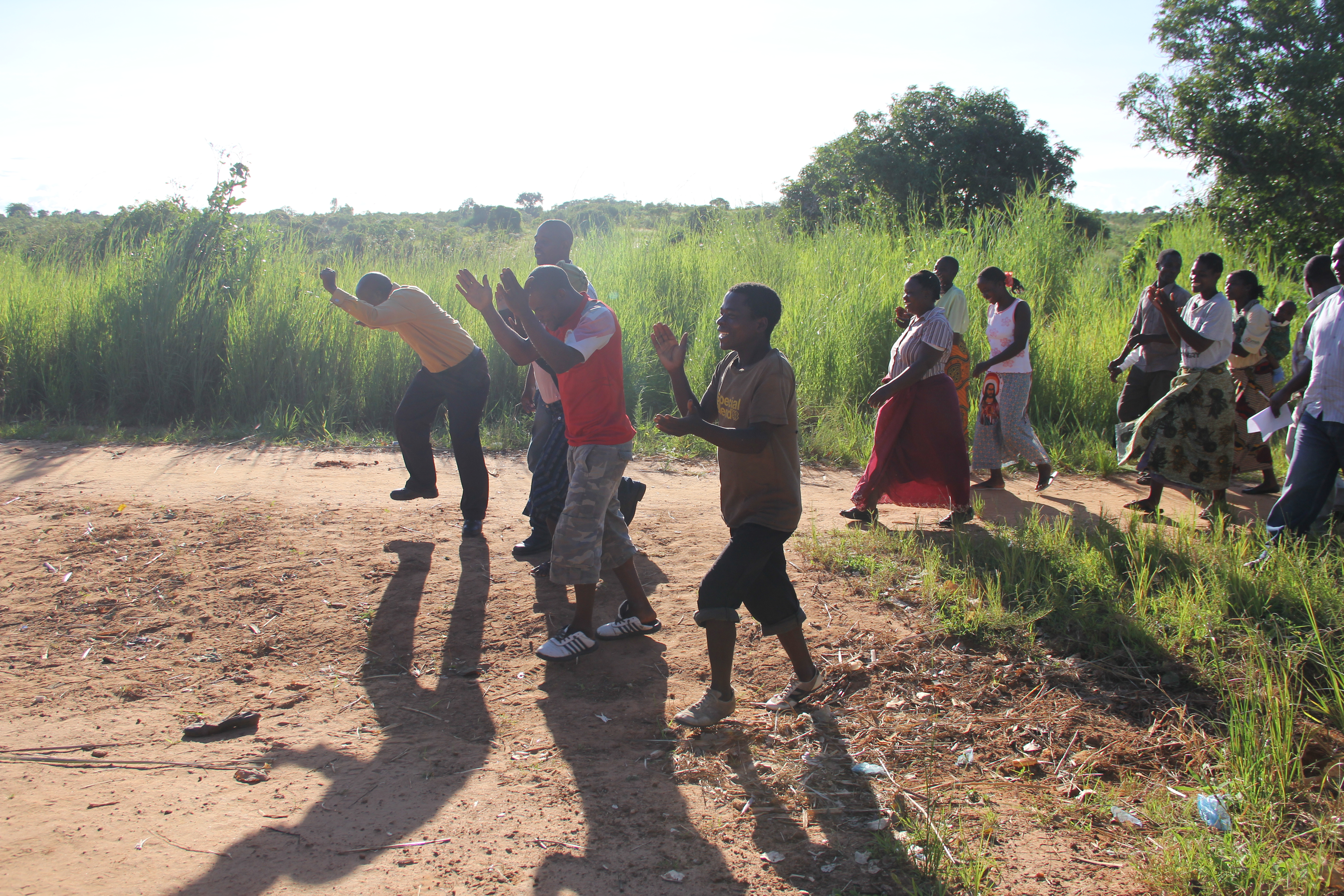
Villagers making a transect walk or 'walk of shame' to the open defecation places, singing 'let us end open defecation' (a village near Lake Malawi, Malawi)

=== Human rights ===
The CLTS behavioral change process is based on the use of shame. This is meant to promote collective consciousness-raising of the severe impacts of open defecation and trigger shock and self-awareness when participants realize the implications of their actions. The triggering process can however infringe on the human rights of recipients, even without intention to do so. There have been cases of fines (monetary and non-monetary), withholding of entitlements, public taunting, posting of humiliating pictures, and even violence. In some cases, CLTS successes might be based on coercion only.

CLTS is in principle compatible with a human rights-based approach to sanitation but there are bad practice examples in the name of CLTS. More rigorous coaching of CLTS practitioners, government public health officials and local leaders on issues such as stigma, awareness of social norms and pre-existing inequalities are important.

Catarina de Albuquerque, the former United Nations Special Rapporteur on the Right to Water and Sanitation, is quoted as saying that "Observers have also recognized that incentives for encouraging behavior change and the construction of latrines are sometimes unacceptable, and include public shaming, including photographing, of those who still practice open defecation."

More debate is still needed regarding human rights consequences of post-triggering punitive measures.

=== Toilet standards and toilet types ===
CLTS does not specify technical standards for toilets. This keeps the costs of constructing toilets very low and allows villagers to start building their toilets immediately. However, it can produce two problems: first in flood plains or areas near water tables, poorly constructed latrines are likely to contaminate the water table and thus represent little improvement. Second, the long-term use of sanitation facilities is related to the pleasantness of the facilities, but dirty overflowing pits are unlikely to be utilised in the longer term. As a related issue, CLTS does not address latrine emptying services or how they dispose of waste. This has led some researchers to say that the success of CLTS is largely based on the cultural suitability of how it is delivered and the degree to which supply-side constraints are addressed.

Some villagers may not be aware of alternative toilet options (like urine-diverting dry toilets or composting toilets). Unless the facilitators of the CLTS process inform them about these options, they may opt for pour flush pit latrines even in situations where groundwater pollution is a significant problem.

=== Long-term usage rates (sustainability) ===
There is also concern about the number of people who go back to open defecation some months after having been through the CLTS process. A Plan Australia study from 2013 investigated that 116 villages were considered Open Defecation Free (ODF) following CLTS across several African countries. After two years, 87% of the 4960 households had fully functioning latrines – but these were considered the most basic and none of the communities had moved up the sanitation ladder. 89% of households had no visible excreta in the vicinity, but only 37% had handwashing facilities present. When broader criteria for declaring communities ODF was used, an overall "slippage rate" of 92% was found. Consequently, researchers suggest that communities need support to upgrade facilities in ODF villages 'triggered' by CLTS.

A study in 2018 found little evidence for sustained sanitation behavior change as a result of CLTS.

== History ==
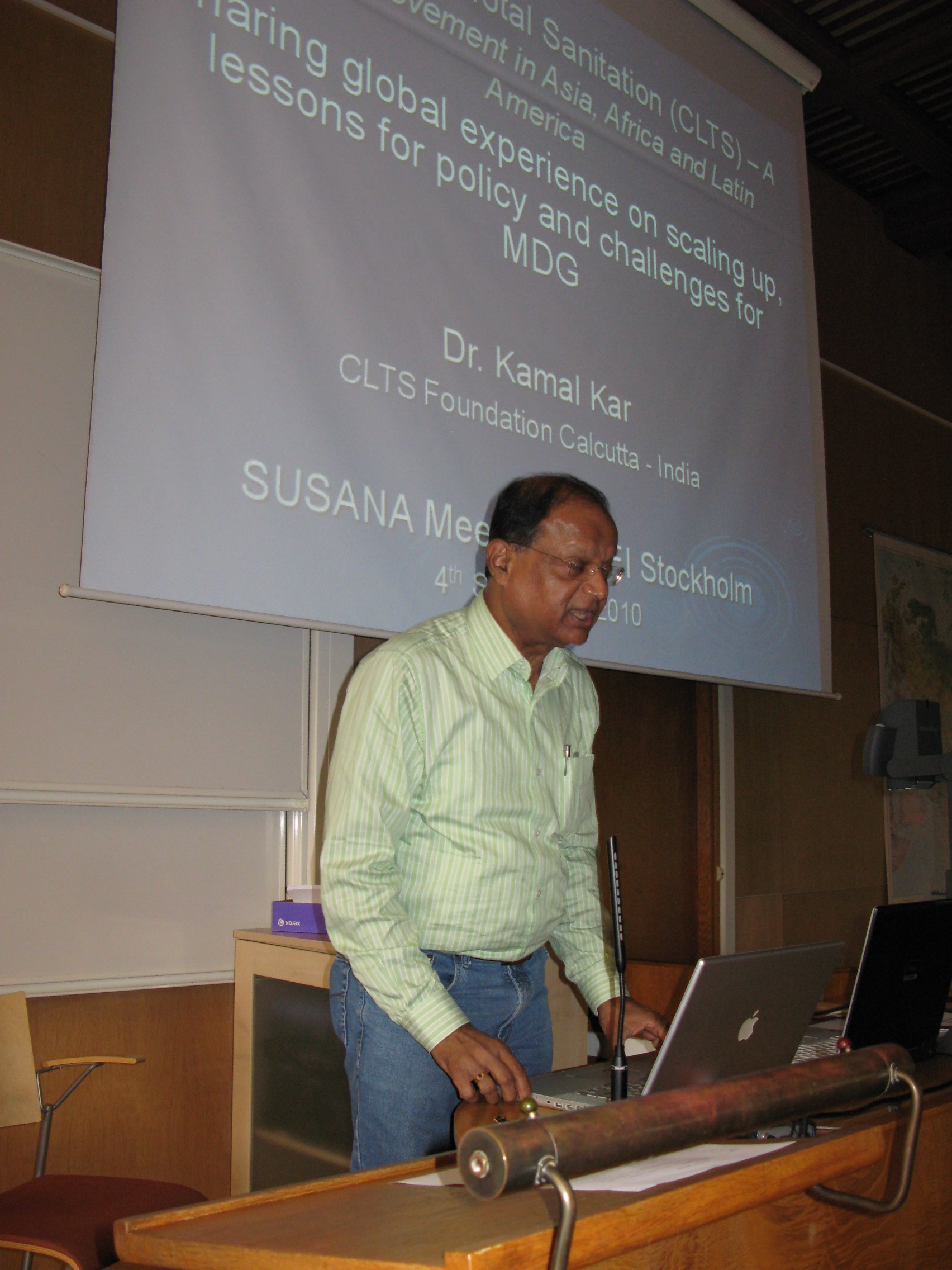
Kamal Kar presented information about CLTS at a meeting of the Sustainable Sanitation Alliance in Sweden in 2010.

In 1999 and 2000, Kamal Kar was working in a village called Mosmoil in Rajshahi, Bangladesh, and decided that a system of attitudinal changes by villagers might have a longer-lasting effect than the existing top-down approach involving subsidies from NGOs and government. The Bangladeshi government began installing expensive latrines in the 1970s, but the government decided this was too costly, and many of the original latrines were abandoned. In the 1990s, a social mobilization plan was put in place to encourage people to demand and install better sanitation systems, but early success did not last, according to Kar. At that point, Kar, a participatory development expert from India, was brought in by WaterAid. He concluded that the problem with previous approaches was that local people had not "internalized" the demand for sanitation. He suggested a new approach: abandoning subsidies and appealing to the better nature of villagers and their sense of self-disgust to bring about change. The CLTS Foundation is the organization set up by Kar to promote these ideas.

It eventually became standard practice for NGOs to leave the community quite soon after "triggering" activities. When communities took the lead, changes in sanitation practices were more long term and sustainable.

== See also ==
- Ecopsychology
- Orangi Pilot Project
- Self-supply of water and sanitation
- Swachh Bharat Abhiyan (Clean India Mission)
- WASH (Water, sanitation and hygiene)
- No Toilet, No Bride
- Take Poo to the Loo
