= Norovirus cis-acting replication element =

RNA element

In molecular biology, the Norovirus cis-acting replication element (CRE) is an RNA element which is found in the coding region of the RNA-dependent RNA polymerase in Norovirus. It occurs near to the 5′ end of the RNA dependant RNA polymerase gene, this is the same location that the Hepatitis A virus cis-acting replication element is found in.

== See also ==
- Cis-regulatory element
- Regulation of gene expression
