= Take Poo to the Loo =

Indian campaign against open defecation

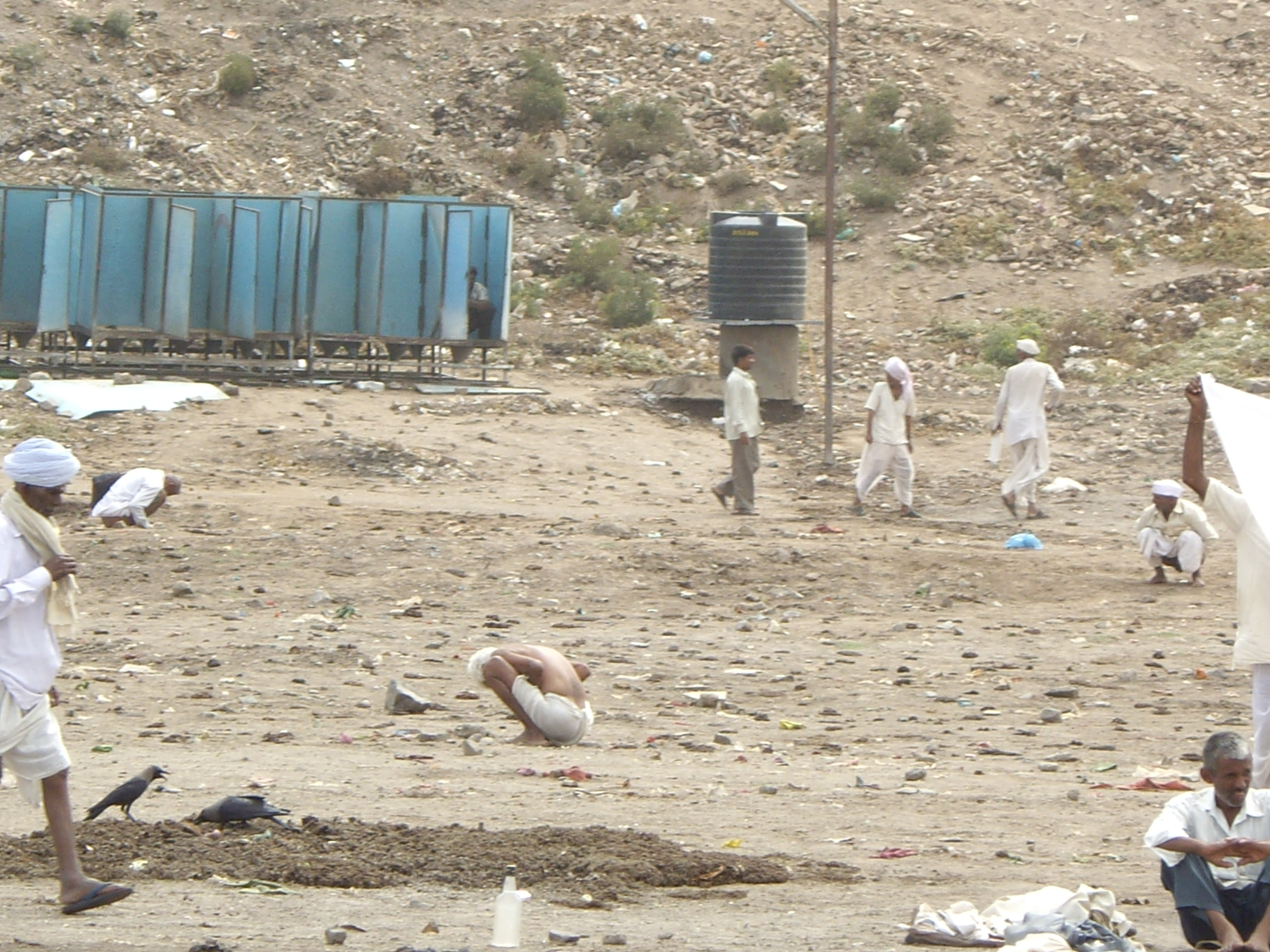
- Open defecation in India
- Date: November 2013
- Location: India
- Also known as: "Poo2Loo"
- Type: Social media campaign
- Theme: Open defecation
- Organised by: UNICEF India
- Website: web.archive.org/web/20131116111016/http://poo2loo.com (archive)

"Take Poo to the Loo", commonly shortened to "Poo2Loo", was an Indian social media campaign led by UNICEF to combat the country's problems with open defecation. The campaign received a mixed reception online, and was the subject of humour and ridicule on social media.

The "Poo2Loo" campaign, launched in India in March 2013 by UNICEF India and the Indian Institutes of Technology, aimed to end open defecation as part of the Total Sanitation Campaign initiated by the Indian government in 1999. The campaign encouraged citizens to pledge support through a petition to President Pranab Mukherjee, calling for a cleaner India. Featuring a humorous website with puns, an educational video game Toilet Trek, and the mascot "Mr. Poo," the campaign sought to raise awareness and promote cultural change around sanitation practices.

== History ==
The Times of India reported that the idea was developed and initiated in March 2013 after a sanitation conference was organised by UNICEF India and the Indian Institutes of Technology as part of the larger Total Sanitation Campaign, which the Indian government launched in 1999.

Poo2Loo calls on Indians to "take the pledge" and show support by signing the following petition addressed to then President Pranab Mukherjee:

Hon'ble President of India,
I call on you as Head of State to ensure that India rises to the challenge of ending open defecation. As a citizen of India, I am proud of our country's rich and varied culture; we have a beautiful land. However, over 620 million people do not use a toilet and nearly as many accept this practice. The result is an unacceptable level of filth in our environment. This is why I have chosen to take a stand and raise my voice with that of many other young people. We want our sisters and brothers to survive, grow and develop as healthy individuals in a clean country. We urgently request your help. Together we can change India.

The website of the campaign contains many puns and some unusual media, including a simple educational video game called Toilet Trek. The campaign also produced an official music video. The official mascot of the campaign is antihero "Mr. Poo", an anthropomorphic lump of excrement.

== See also ==
- Community-led total sanitation
- Swachh Bharat Mission
- No Toilet, No Bride
