= Project Raahat =

Sanitation project in Delhi, India

Project Raahat is an initiative of Enactus Shaheed Sukhdev College of Business Studies and was started on 29 December 2015 in collaboration with Delhi Urban Shelter Improvement Board, Government of National Capital Territory of Delhi, India. Under Project Raahat, the management of Community Toilet Complexes (CTCs) is undertaken by the students, including aspects relating to operational management, aesthetic modification and sensitisation activities.

The project was opened at toilets in Sultanpuri and Kirti Nagar.

== Need ==
Open defecation is the practice of people defecating outside and not into a designated toilet. The term is widely used in literature about water, sanitation, and hygiene issues in developing countries. Open defecation causes public health problems in areas where people defecate in fields, urban parks, rivers, and open trenches, near the living space of others.

== Raahat Model ==
The Raahat Model is carried out in phases.

- The first leg of the project is identification of a slum in which they can conduct their operations. The sites have to be scouted for the demography, as well as adequate infrastructural requirements to suit the needs of the project. Need assessment surveys are carried out for the same.
- After a required site has been chosen, the appropriate governmental body (mostly DUSIB) is contacted for allocation of a toilet complex in the vicinity of that area.
- Also, an entrepreneur and a cleaner is identified from the community which acts as the caretaker for the toilet complex. The entrepreneur is free to take decisions for the CTC in consultation with the project members. The caretaker is taught how to carry out basic operations for the site for a period of one year, after which the intervention of the team is minimal. Skill development and training of the entrepreneur takes place simultaneously. Raahat empowers it’s entrepreneurs in the following ways:
  - Livelihood i.e. a source of income is provided by the project. Most people in slums work as daily wage laborers who either don’t earn in proportion to their work or are unable to fend for their families. Raahat provides productivity linked income to the entrepreneurs which uplifts them through a better living status.
  - Safety and Security of job and work is not often found in the informal sector. Raahat complies with all the rules and regulations of formal business sector and hence shifts the populace from the unorganized to an organized business environment.
  - Social Security Benefits are almost never availed by urban slum dwellers. All the Raahat entrepreneurs and cleaners are provided with basic amenities like a gratuity fund and life insurance, bringing them peace of mind.
- The operations begin with aesthetic modification of the site with wall art, posters and vertical gardens. Moving forward, proper set-up for the model to work.

== Innovations ==
=== Raahi ===
The team created a cartoon character called Rahi, a superhero, to draw the attention of slum kids towards the importance of using a toilet. The character is used in their camps, being impersonated by one other members. Kids see Raahi as a someone who is there to help them lead a healthy life.

=== Ticket System ===
A ticket system has been put in by Project Raahat in their complexes which enables the community to reap benefits through reduced expenditure on their use of the CTC. Under conventional pay-per-use system employed in majority of the toilet complexes, the users are charged Re.1 each time they use a toilet complex. Under the Ticket system, they buy a bundle of Rs.10 containing 11 tickets instead. The users turn in one ticket each time they use the complex.
