= Fecal–oral route =

Disease transmission via pathogens from fecal particles

The "F-diagram" (feces, fingers, flies, fields, fluids, food), showing pathways of fecal–oral disease transmission. The vertical blue lines show barriers: toilets, safe water, hygiene and handwashing.

The fecal–oral route (also called the oral–fecal route or orofecal route) describes a particular route of transmission of a disease wherein pathogens in fecal particles pass from one person to the mouth of another person. Main causes of fecal–oral disease transmission include lack of adequate sanitation (leading to open defecation), and poor hygiene practices. If soil or water bodies are polluted with fecal material, humans can be infected with waterborne diseases or soil-transmitted diseases. Fecal contamination of food is another form of fecal-oral transmission. Washing hands properly after changing a baby's diaper or after performing anal hygiene can prevent foodborne illness from spreading. Toilet flushing and subsequent inhaled aerosols is another potential route.

The common factors in the fecal-oral route can be summarized as five Fs: fingers, flies, fields, fluids, and food. Diseases caused by fecal-oral transmission include typhoid, cholera, polio, hepatitis and many other infections, especially ones that cause diarrhea.

== Background ==
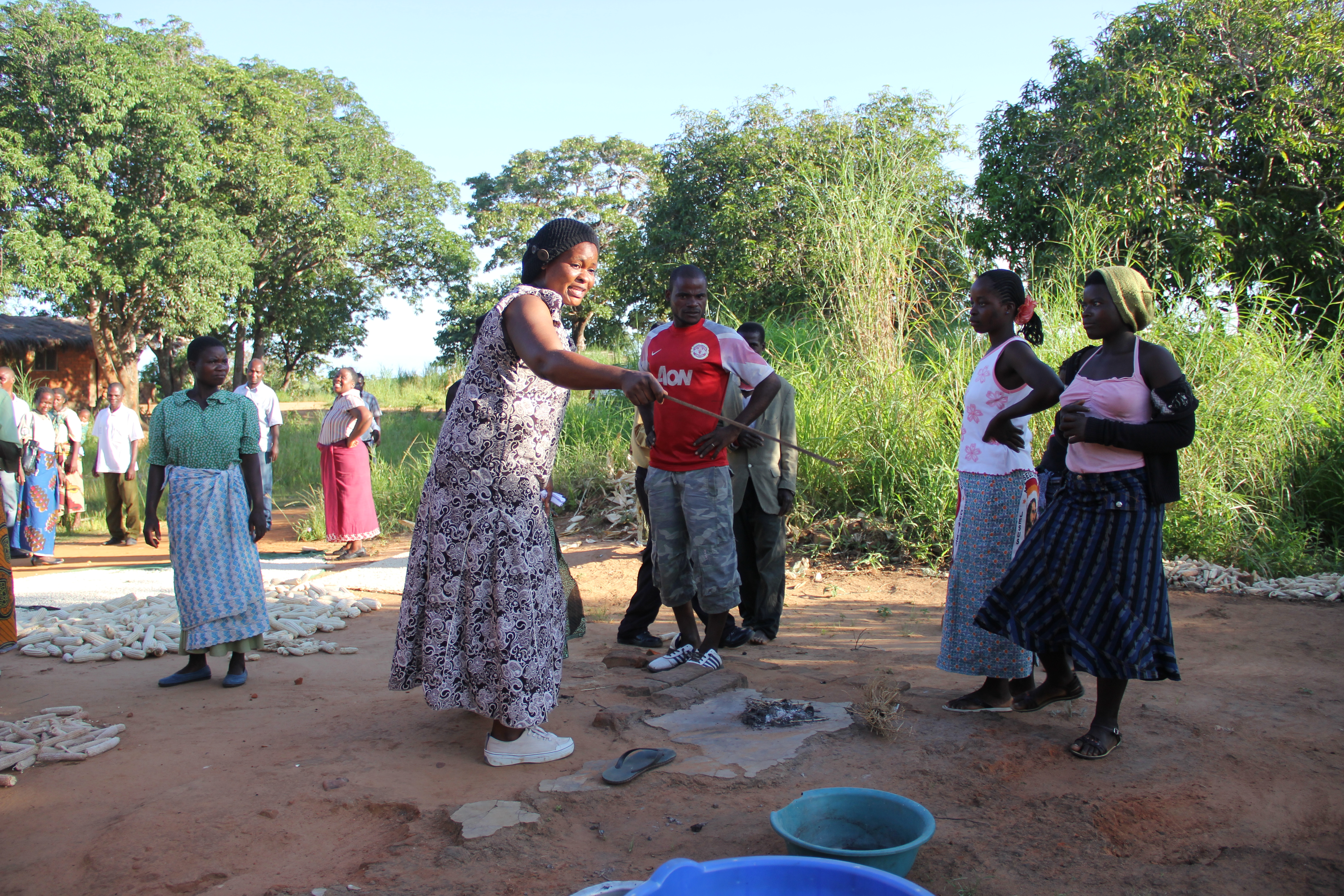
Villagers during a community-led total sanitation (CLTS) triggering exercise go to the place where meals are prepared to observe how flies are attracted to human feces and carry diseases by landing on the food (village near Lake Malawi, Malawi)

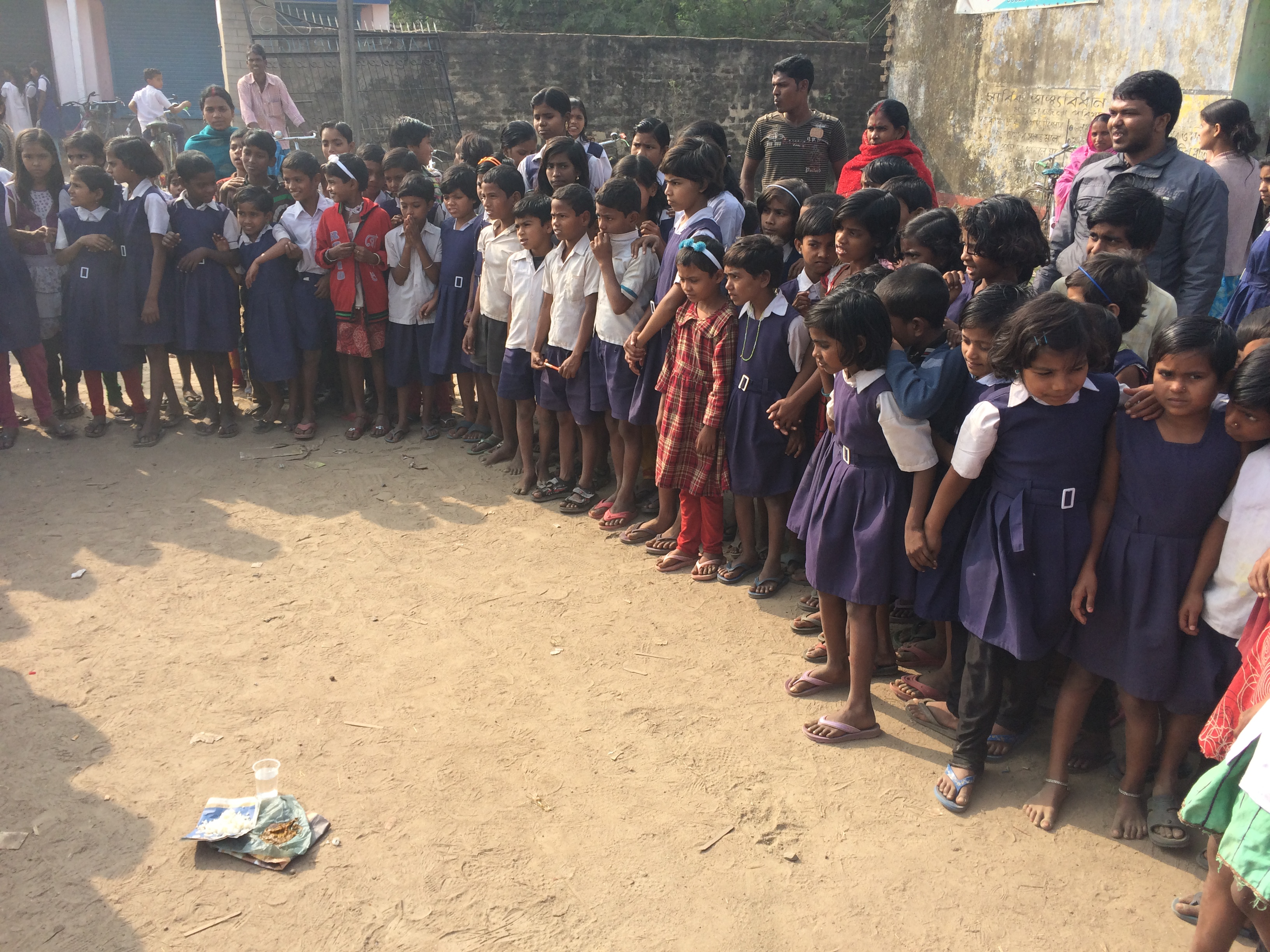
School children during a CLTS triggering event in West Bengal, India looking at a glass of water and fresh human feces where the flies pass from the water to the feces and back. This demonstrates how pathogens can pollute water.

Although fecal–oral transmission is usually discussed as a route of transmission, it is actually a specification of the entry and exit portals of the pathogen, and can operate across several of the other routes of transmission. Fecal–oral transmission is primarily considered as an indirect contact route through contaminated food or water. However, it can also operate through direct contact with feces or contaminated body parts, such as through anal sex. It can also operate through droplet or airborne transmission through the toilet plume from contaminated toilets.

=== F-diagram ===
The foundations for the "F-diagram" being used today were laid down in a publication by the World Health Organization (WHO) in 1958. This publication explained transmission routes and barriers to the transmission of diseases from the focal point of human feces.

Modifications have been made over the course of history to derive modern-looking F-diagrams. These diagrams are used in many sanitation publications. They are set up in a way that fecal–oral transmission pathways are shown to take place via water, hands, arthropods and soil. To make it easier to remember, words starting with the letter "F" are used for each of these pathways, namely fluids, fingers, flies, food, fields, fomites (objects and household surfaces).

Rather than only concentrating on human feces, feces from other animals should also be included in the F-diagram.

The sanitation and hygiene barriers when placed correctly prevent the transmission of an infection through hands, water and food. The F-diagram can be used to show how proper sanitation (in particular toilets, hygiene, handwashing) can act as an effective barrier to stop transmission of diseases via fecal–oral pathways.

== Examples ==
=== Transmission ===
The process of transmission may be simple or involve multiple steps. Some examples of routes of fecal–oral transmission include:

- water that has come in contact with feces (for example due to groundwater pollution from pit latrines) and is then not treated properly before drinking;
- by shaking someone's hand that has been contaminated by stool, changing a child's diapers, working in the garden, or dealing with domestic animals;
- food that has been prepared in the presence of fecal matter;
- eating soil (geophagia);
- disease vectors, like houseflies, spreading contamination from inadequate fecal disposal such as open defecation;
- poor or absent hand washing after using the toilet or changing diapers
- Toilet Flushing, aerosols created from flushing go on to contaminate the air & particles land after a few minutes creating infectious pools known as fomites;
- poor or absent cleaning of anything that has been in contact with feces;
- sexual practices that may involve oral contact with feces, such as anilingus, coprophilia, or A2M.
- eating feces, in children, or in a mental disorder called coprophagia

=== Prevention ===
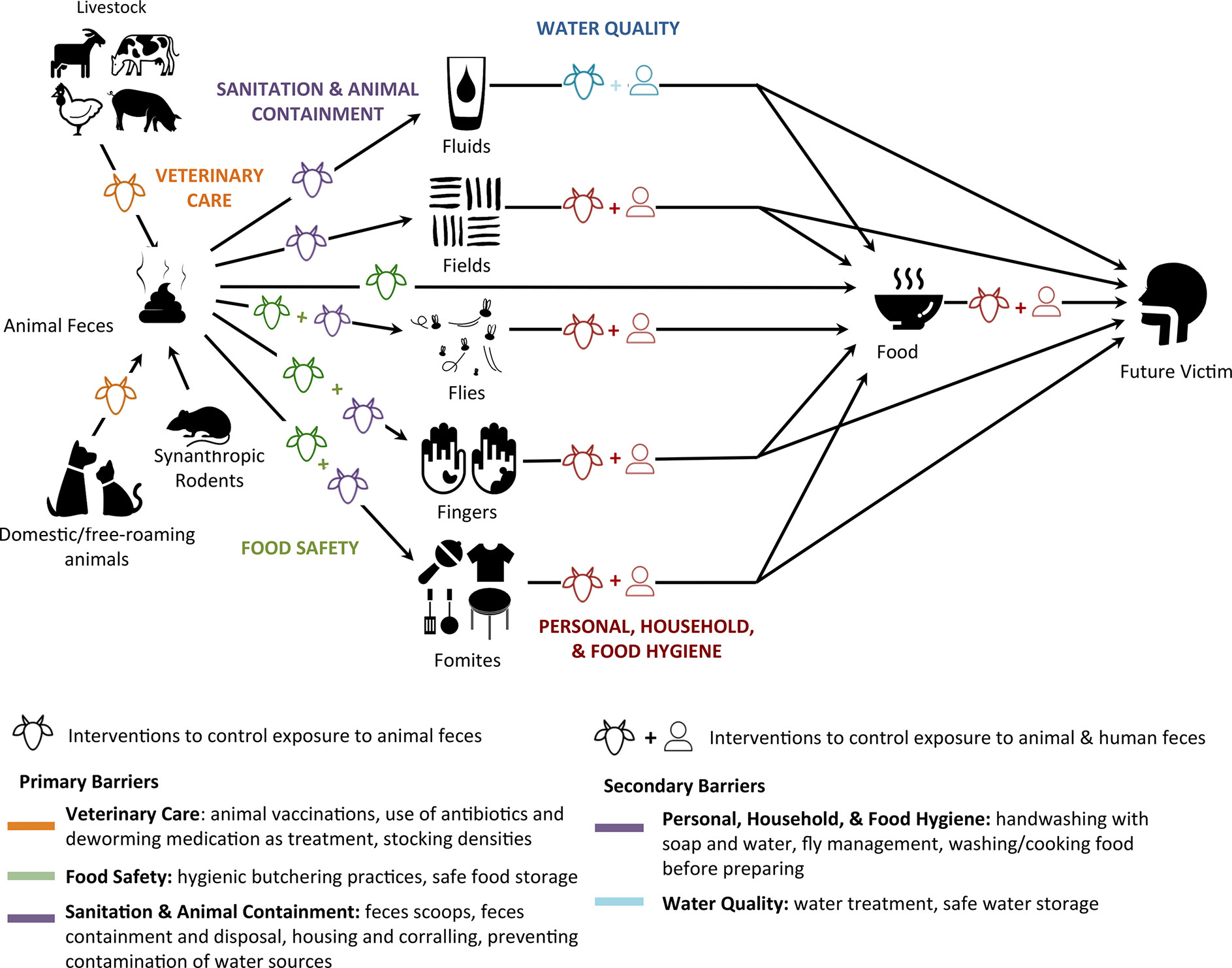
Modified F-diagram including interventions that can block human exposure to animal feces.

One approach to changing people's behaviors and stopping open defecation is the community-led total sanitation approach. In this process "live demonstrations" of flies moving from food to fresh human feces and back are used. This can "trigger" villagers into action.

== Diseases ==
The list below shows the main diseases that can be passed via the fecal–oral route. They are grouped by the type of pathogen involved in disease transmission.

=== Bacteria ===
- Vibrio cholerae (cholera)
- Clostridioides difficile (pseudomembranous enterocolitis)
- Shigella (shigellosis / bacillary dysentery)
- Salmonella typhii (typhoid fever)
- Vibrio parahaemolyticus
- Escherichia coli
- Campylobacter
- Helicobacter pylori

=== Viruses ===
- Hepatitis A
- Hepatitis E
- Enteroviruses
- Norovirus acute gastroenteritis
- Poliovirus (poliomyelitis)
- Most human Coronaviruses are transmitted fecally including Feline coronavirus, there have also been reports of SARS-CoV-2 being found in stool samples.
- Rotavirus gastroenteritis
- Adenovirus gastroenteritis

=== Protozoans ===
- Entamoeba histolytica (amoebiasis / amoebic dysentery)
- Giardia (giardiasis)
- Cryptosporidium (cryptosporidiosis)
- Toxoplasma gondii (toxoplasmosis)

=== Helminths ===
- Tapeworms
- Soil-transmitted helminths

=== Related diseases ===
Waterborne diseases are diseases caused by pathogenic microorganisms that most commonly are transmitted in contaminated fresh water. This is one particular type of fecal-oral transmission.

Neglected tropical diseases also include many diseases transmitted via the fecal-oral route.

== See also ==
- Basic reproduction number
- Toilet
- Vector control
- Hookworm
