= Norovirus GII.4 Sydney =

Virus classification
- (unranked): Virus
- Realm: Riboviria
- Kingdom: Orthornavirae
- Phylum: Pisuviricota
- Class: Pisoniviricetes
- Order: Picornavirales
- Family: Caliciviridae
- Genus: Norovirus
- Species: Norwalk virus
- Strain: Norovirus GII.4 Sydney

Strain of virus

GII.4 Sydney is a strain of Norovirus first discovered in March 2012 and was the strain responsible for several Norovirus outbreaks worldwide, and appears to have replaced the previously predominant strain GII.4 New Orleans. Millions of cases of GII.4 Sydney were reported in Australia, France, New Zealand, Japan, and elsewhere. England and Wales reported 63% more cases for this strain than for the previous year's strain. It belongs to Genogroup II, genotype 4, or GII.4.

This variant of the virus has a common ancestor with the previously dominant variants of GII.4 Apeldoorn (2007) and NewOrleans (2009), but is phylogenetically distinct. Amino acid changes are seen in the main epitopes, consistent with observations from prior epidemics. This may have led to an escape to existing herd immunity and might explain the observed increased outbreak activity.

The virus can live on hard surfaces for several weeks and as few as 18 viral particles (virons) are enough to make a person sick (compared to 1,000 for the common flu). Common home cleaning agents do not eliminate the virus and it is only removed from a person's hands by repeatedly washing them.
