= Norovirus =

Type of viruses that cause gastroenteritis

- Other names: Winter vomiting bug, stomach bug
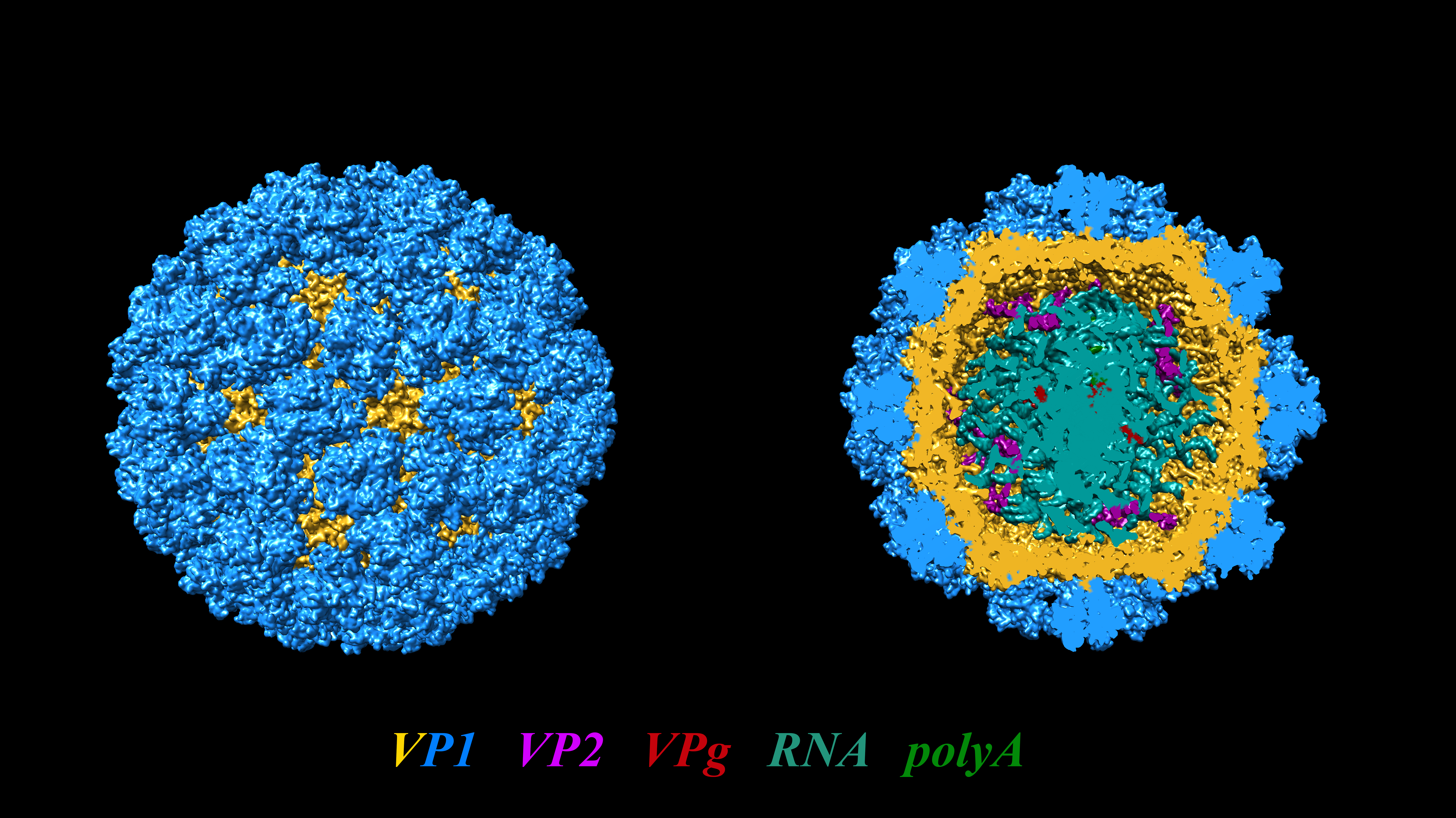
- Full and dissected views at atomic resolution, generated using UCSF Chimera software.
- Specialty: Infectious diseases
- Symptoms: Diarrhea, vomiting, stomach pain, headache
- Complications: Dehydration
- Usual onset: 12 to 24 hours after exposure
- Duration: 1 to 3 days
- Causes: Norovirus
- Diagnostic method: Based on symptoms
- Prevention: Hand washing, disinfection of contaminated surfaces
- Treatment: Supportive care (drinking sufficient fluids or intravenous fluids)
- Frequency: 688 million cases per year
- Deaths: ~200,000 per year

Norovirus, also known as Norwalk virus, is the most common cause of gastroenteritis. The infection, sometimes referred to informally as the winter vomiting disease or the stomach flu, is characterized by non-bloody diarrhea, vomiting, and stomach pain. Fever or headaches may also occur. Symptoms usually develop 24 hours after being exposed, and recovery typically occurs within one to three days. Complications are uncommon, but may include dehydration, especially in the young, the old, and those with other health problems.

The virus is usually spread by the fecal–oral route. This may be through contaminated food or water or person-to-person contact. It may also spread via contaminated surfaces or through air from the vomit of an infected person. Risk factors include unsanitary food preparation and sharing close quarters. Diagnosis is generally based on symptoms. Confirmatory testing is not usually available but may be performed by public health agencies during outbreaks.

Prevention involves proper hand washing and disinfection of contaminated surfaces. There is no vaccine or specific treatment for norovirus. Management involves supportive care such as drinking sufficient fluids or intravenous fluids. Oral rehydration solutions are the preferred fluids to drink, although other drinks without caffeine or alcohol can help. Hand sanitizers based on alcohols tend to be ineffective against noroviruses due to their being non-enveloped, although some virus genotypes are more susceptible.

Norovirus results in about 685 million cases of disease and 200,000 deaths globally a year. It is common both in the developed and developing world. Those under the age of five are most often affected, and in this group it results in about 50,000 deaths in the developing world. Norovirus infections occur more commonly during winter months. It often occurs in outbreaks, especially among those living in close quarters. In the United States, it is the cause of about half of all foodborne disease outbreaks. The virus is named after the city of Norwalk, Ohio, where an outbreak occurred in 1968.

== Signs and symptoms ==
Norovirus infection is characterized by nausea, vomiting, watery diarrhea, abdominal pain, and in some cases, loss of taste. A person usually develops symptoms of gastroenteritis 24 hours after being exposed to norovirus. General lethargy, weakness, muscle aches, headaches, and low-grade fevers may occur. The disease is usually self-limiting, and severe illness is rare. Although having norovirus can be unpleasant, it is not usually dangerous, and most who contract it make a full recovery within two to three days.

Norovirus can establish a long-term infection in people who are immunocompromised, such as those with common variable immunodeficiency or with a suppressed immune system after organ transplantation. These infections can be with or without symptoms. In severe cases, persistent infections can lead to norovirus‐associated enteropathy, intestinal villous atrophy, and malabsorption.

== Virology ==
Norovirus
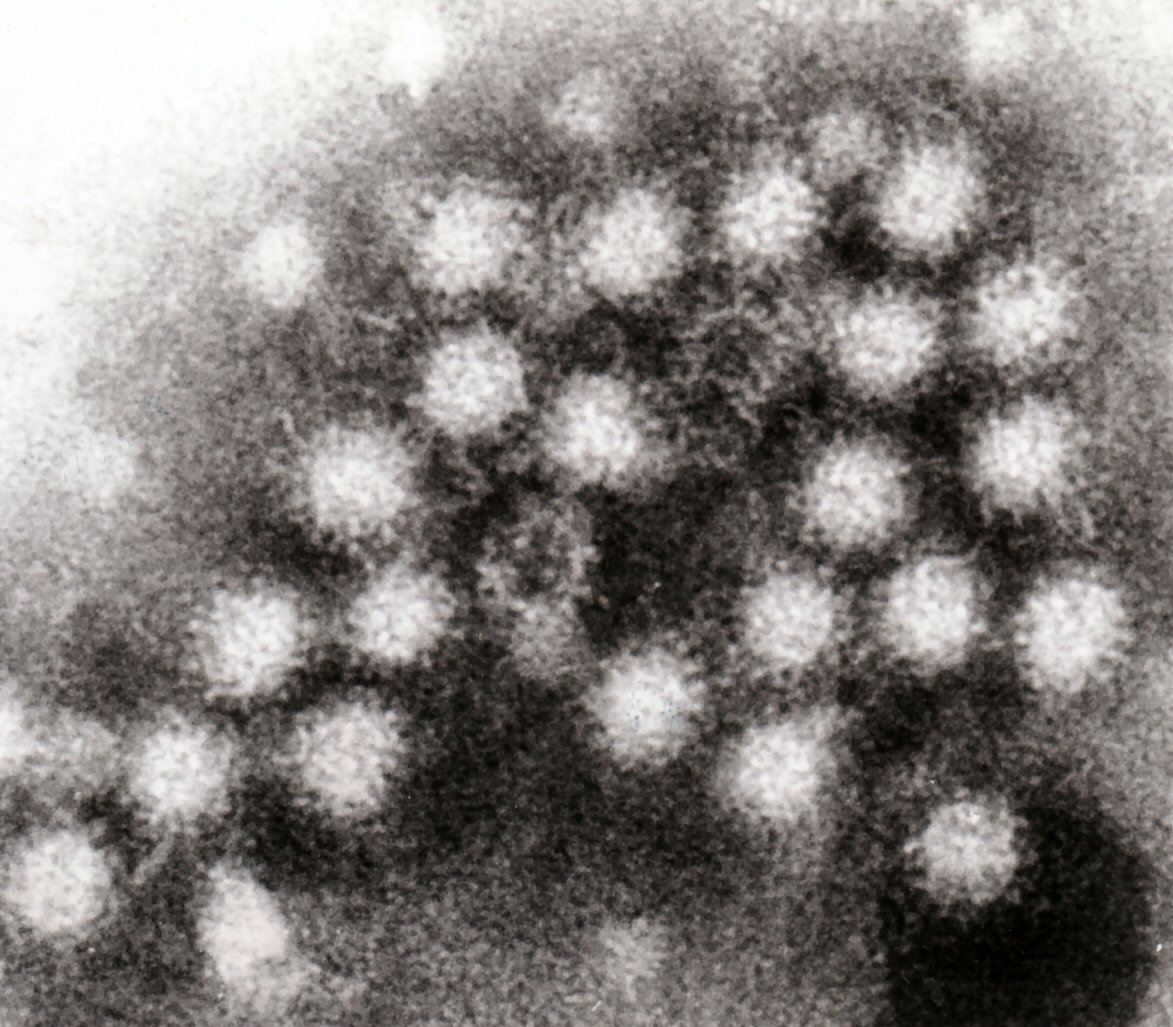
- Transmission electron micrograph of Norovirus particles in feces

Virus classification
- (unranked): Virus
- Realm: Riboviria
- Kingdom: Orthornavirae
- Phylum: Pisuviricota
- Class: Pisoniviricetes
- Order: Picornavirales
- Family: Caliciviridae
- Genus: Norovirus
- Species: Norovirus norwalkense

Synonyms
- Norwalk virus

=== Transmission ===
Noroviruses are transmitted directly from person to person (62–84% of all reported outbreaks) and indirectly via contaminated water and food. Transmission can be aerosolized when those stricken with the illness vomit or by a toilet flush when vomit or diarrhea is present; infection can follow eating food or breathing air near an episode of vomiting, even if cleaned up. The viruses continue to be shed after symptoms have subsided, and shedding can still be detected many weeks after infection.

Vomiting, in particular, transmits infection effectively and appears to allow airborne transmission. In one incident, a person who vomited spread the infection across a restaurant, suggesting that many unexplained cases of food poisoning may have their source in vomit. In December 1998, 126 people were dining at six tables; one person vomited onto the floor. Staff quickly cleaned up, and people continued eating. Three days later, others started falling ill; 52 people reported a range of symptoms, from fever and nausea to vomiting and diarrhea. The cause was not immediately identified. Researchers plotted the seating arrangement: more than 90% of the people at the same table as the sick person later reported becoming ill. There was a direct correlation between the risk of infection of people at other tables and how close they were to the sick person. More than 70% of the diners at an adjacent table fell ill; at a table on the other side of the restaurant, the infection rate was still 25%. The outbreak was attributed to a Norwalk-like virus (norovirus). Other cases of transmission by vomit were later identified.

In one outbreak at an international scout jamboree in the Netherlands, each person with gastroenteritis infected an average of 14 people before increased hygiene measures were put in place. Even after these new measures were enacted, an ill person still infected an average of 2.1 other people. A US Centers for Disease Control and Prevention (CDC) study of 11 outbreaks in New York State lists the suspected mode of transmission as person-to-person in seven outbreaks, foodborne in two, waterborne in one, and one unknown. The source of waterborne outbreaks may include water from municipal supplies, wells, recreational lakes, swimming pools, and ice machines.

Shellfish and salad ingredients are the foods most often implicated in norovirus outbreaks. Ingestion of shellfish that has not been sufficiently heated – under 75 °C (167 °F) – poses a high risk for norovirus infection. Foods other than shellfish may be contaminated by infected food handlers. Many norovirus outbreaks have been traced to food that was handled by only one infected person.

From March to August 2017, in Quebec, Canada, there was an outbreak of norovirus that sickened more than 700 people. According to an investigation by Canada's CFIA Food Control Agency, the culprit was frozen raspberries imported from Harbin Gaotai Food Co Ltd, a Chinese supplier. Canadian authorities subsequently issued a recall on raspberry products from Harbin Gaotai.

According to the CDC, there was a surge in norovirus cases on thirteen cruise ships in 2023, which marks the highest number of outbreaks since 2012.

=== Classification ===
Noroviruses (NoV) are a genetically diverse group of single-stranded positive-sense RNA, non-enveloped viruses belonging to the family Caliciviridae. According to the International Committee on Taxonomy of Viruses, the genus Norovirus has one species: Norwalk virus (Norovirus norwalkense).

Noroviruses can genetically be classified into at least seven different genogroups (GI, GII, GIII, GIV, GV, GVI, and GVII), which can be further divided into other genetic clusters or genotypes.

Noroviruses commonly isolated in cases of acute gastroenteritis belong to two genogroups: genogroup I (GI), which includes Norwalk virus, Desert Shield virus, and Southampton virus; and II (GII), which includes Bristol virus, Lordsdale virus, Toronto virus, Mexico virus, Hawaii virus, and Snow Mountain virus.

Most noroviruses that infect humans belong to genogroups GI and GII. Noroviruses from genogroup II, genotype 4 (abbreviated as GII.4), account for the majority of adult outbreaks of gastroenteritis and often sweep across the globe.

Recent examples include the US95/96-US strain, associated with global outbreaks in the mid- to late-1990s; Farmington Hills virus associated with outbreaks in Europe and the United States in 2002 and in 2004; and the Hunter virus, which was associated with outbreaks in Europe, Japan, and Australasia. In 2006, there was another large increase in NoV infection around the globe. Reports have shown a link between the expression of human histo-blood group antigens (HBGAs) and the susceptibility to norovirus infection. Studies have suggested the capsid of noroviruses may have evolved from selective pressure of human HBGAs. HBGAs are not, however, the receptor or facilitator of norovirus infection. Co-factors such as bile salts may facilitate the infection, making it more intense when introduced during or after the initial infection of the host tissue. Bile salts are produced by the liver in response to eating fatty foods, and they help with the absorption of consumed lipids. It is not yet clear at what specific point in the Norovirus replication cycle bile salts facilitate infection: penetration, uncoating, or maintaining capsid stability.

The protein MDA-5 may be the primary immune sensor that detects the presence of noroviruses in the body. Some people have common variations of the MDA-5 gene that could make them more susceptible to norovirus infection.

=== Structure ===
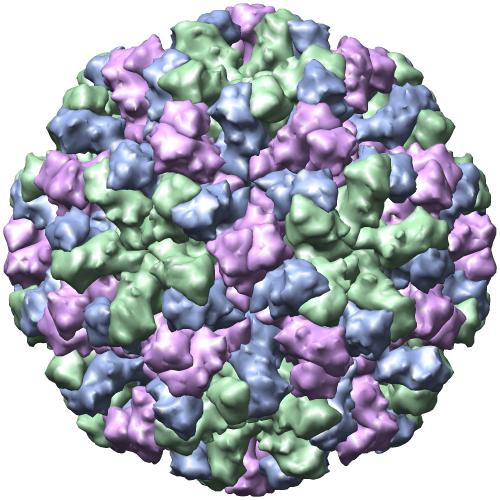
X-ray crystallographic structure of the Norwalk virus capsid

Genus	Structure	Symmetry	Capsid	Genomic arrangement	Genomic segmentation
Norovirus	Icosahedral	T=1, T=3	Non-enveloped	Linear	Monopartite

Viruses in Norovirus are non-enveloped, with icosahedral geometries. Capsid diameters vary widely, from 23 to 40 nm in diameter. The larger capsids (38–40 nm) exhibit T=3 symmetry and are composed of 180 VP1 proteins. Small capsids (23 nm) show T=1 symmetry, and are composed of 60 VP1 proteins. The virus particles demonstrate an amorphous surface structure when visualized using electron microscopy.

=== Genome ===
Noroviruses contain a linear, non-segmented, positive-sense RNA genome of approximately 7.5 kilobases, encoding a large polyprotein which is cleaved into six smaller non-structural proteins (NS1/2 to NS7) by the viral 3C-like protease (NS6), a major structural protein (VP1) of about 58~60 kDa and a minor capsid protein (VP2).

The most variable region of the viral capsid is the P2 domain, which contains antigen-presenting sites and carbohydrate-receptor binding regions.

=== Evolution ===
Groups 1, 2, 3, and 4 last shared a common ancestor in AD 867. The group 2 and group 4 viruses last shared a common ancestor in approximately AD 1443 (95% highest posterior density AD 1336–1542). Several estimates of the evolution rate have been made, varying from 8.98 × 10^{−3} to 2.03 × 10^{−3} substitutions per site per year.

The estimated mutation rate (1.21×10^{−2} to 1.41 ×10^{−2} substitutions per site per year) in this virus is high even compared with other RNA viruses.

In addition, a recombination hotspot exists at the ORF1-ORF2 (VP1) junction.

=== Replication cycle ===
Viral replication is cytoplasmic. Entry into the host cell is achieved by attachment to host receptors, which mediates endocytosis. Positive-stranded RNA virus transcription is the method of replication. Translation takes place by leaky scanning and RNA termination-reinitiation. Humans and other mammals serve as the natural host. Transmission routes are fecal-oral and contamination.

Genus	Host details	Tissue tropism	Entry details	Release details	Replication site	Assembly site	Transmission
Norovirus	Humans; mammals	Intestinal epithelium	Cell receptor endocytosis	Lysis	Cytoplasm	Cytoplasm	Oral-fecal

== Pathophysiology ==
When a person becomes infected with norovirus, the virus replicates within the small intestine. The principal symptom is acute gastroenteritis, characterized by nausea, forceful vomiting, watery diarrhea, and abdominal pain, that develops 12 to 48 hours after exposure and lasts for 24–72 hours. Sometimes there is loss of taste, general lethargy, weakness, muscle aches, headache, and fever. The disease is usually self-limiting.

Severe illness is rare; although people are frequently treated at the emergency ward, they are rarely admitted to the hospital. The number of deaths from norovirus in the United States is estimated to be around 570–800 each year, with most of these occurring in the very young, the elderly, and persons with weakened immune systems. Symptoms may become life-threatening in these groups if dehydration or electrolyte imbalance is ignored or left untreated.

== Diagnosis ==
Specific diagnosis of norovirus is routinely made by polymerase chain reaction (PCR) assays or quantitative PCR assays, which give results within a few hours. These assays are very sensitive and can detect as few as 10 virus particles. Tests such as ELISA that use antibodies against a mixture of norovirus strains are available commercially, but lack specificity and sensitivity.

== Prevention ==
After infection, immunity to the same strain of the virus – the genotype – protects against reinfection for six months to two years. This immunity does not fully protect against infection with the other diverse genotypes of the virus.

In Canada, norovirus is a notifiable disease. In both the US and the UK it is not notifiable.

=== Hand washing and disinfectants ===
Hand washing with soap and water is an effective method for reducing the transmission of norovirus pathogens. Alcohol rubs (≥62% isopropyl alcohol) may be used as an adjunct, but are less effective than hand-washing, as norovirus lacks a lipid viral envelope. Hand sanitizers based on alcohols tend to be ineffective against noroviruses due to their being non-enveloped, although some virus genotypes were found in in vitro tests with ethanol and isopropyl alcohol to be more susceptible. Alcohol susceptibility patterns between different norovirus genotypes were found to vary widely, and virolysis data for a single strain or genotype were not representative for all noroviruses. Another study found that alcohol in combination with acid (1% citric acid, e.g. from 15% concentrated lemon juice) produced an effective disinfectant of noroviruses.

Surfaces where norovirus particles may be present can be sanitised with a solution of 1.5% to 7.5% of household bleach in water, or other disinfectants effective against norovirus.

=== Healthcare facilities ===
In healthcare environments, the prevention of nosocomial infections involves routine and terminal cleaning. Nonflammable alcohol vapor in CO_{2} systems is used in health care environments where medical electronics would be adversely affected by aerosolized chlorine or other caustic compounds.

In 2011, the CDC published a clinical practice guideline addressing strategies for the prevention and control of norovirus gastroenteritis outbreaks in healthcare settings. Based on a systematic review of published scientific studies, the guideline presents 51 specific evidence-based recommendations, which were organized into 12 categories: 1) patient cohorting and isolation precautions, 2) hand hygiene, 3) patient transfer and ward closure, 4) food handlers in healthcare, 5) diagnostics, 6) personal protective equipment, 7) environmental cleaning, 8) staff leave and policy, 9) visitors, 10) education, 11) active case-finding, and 12) communication and notification. The guideline also identifies eight high-priority recommendations and suggests several areas in need of future research.

=== Vaccine trials ===
LigoCyte announced in 2007 that it was working on a vaccine and had started phase 1 trials. The company has since been taken over by Takeda Pharmaceutical Company. As of 2019, a bivalent (NoV GI.1/GII.4) intramuscular vaccine had completed phase 1 trials. In 2020 the phase 2b trials were finished. The vaccine relies on using a virus-like particle that is made of the norovirus capsid proteins to mimic the external structure of the virus. Since there is no RNA in this particle, it is incapable of reproducing and cannot cause an infection.

=== Persistence ===
The norovirus can survive for long periods outside a human host depending on the surface and temperature conditions: it can survive for weeks on hard and soft surfaces, and it can survive for months, maybe even years in contaminated still water. A 2006 study found the virus remained on surfaces used for food preparation seven days after contamination.

=== Detection in food ===
Routine protocols to detect norovirus in clams and oysters by reverse transcription polymerase chain reaction are being employed by governmental laboratories such as the Food and Drug Administration (FDA) in the US.

== Treatment ==
There is no specific medicine to treat people with norovirus illness. Treatments aim to avoid complications by measures such as the management of dehydration caused by fluid loss in vomiting and diarrhea, and to mitigate symptoms using antiemetics and antidiarrheals.

== Epidemiology ==
Annual Trend in Reports of Norovirus Infection in England and Wales (2000–2011). Source: HPA

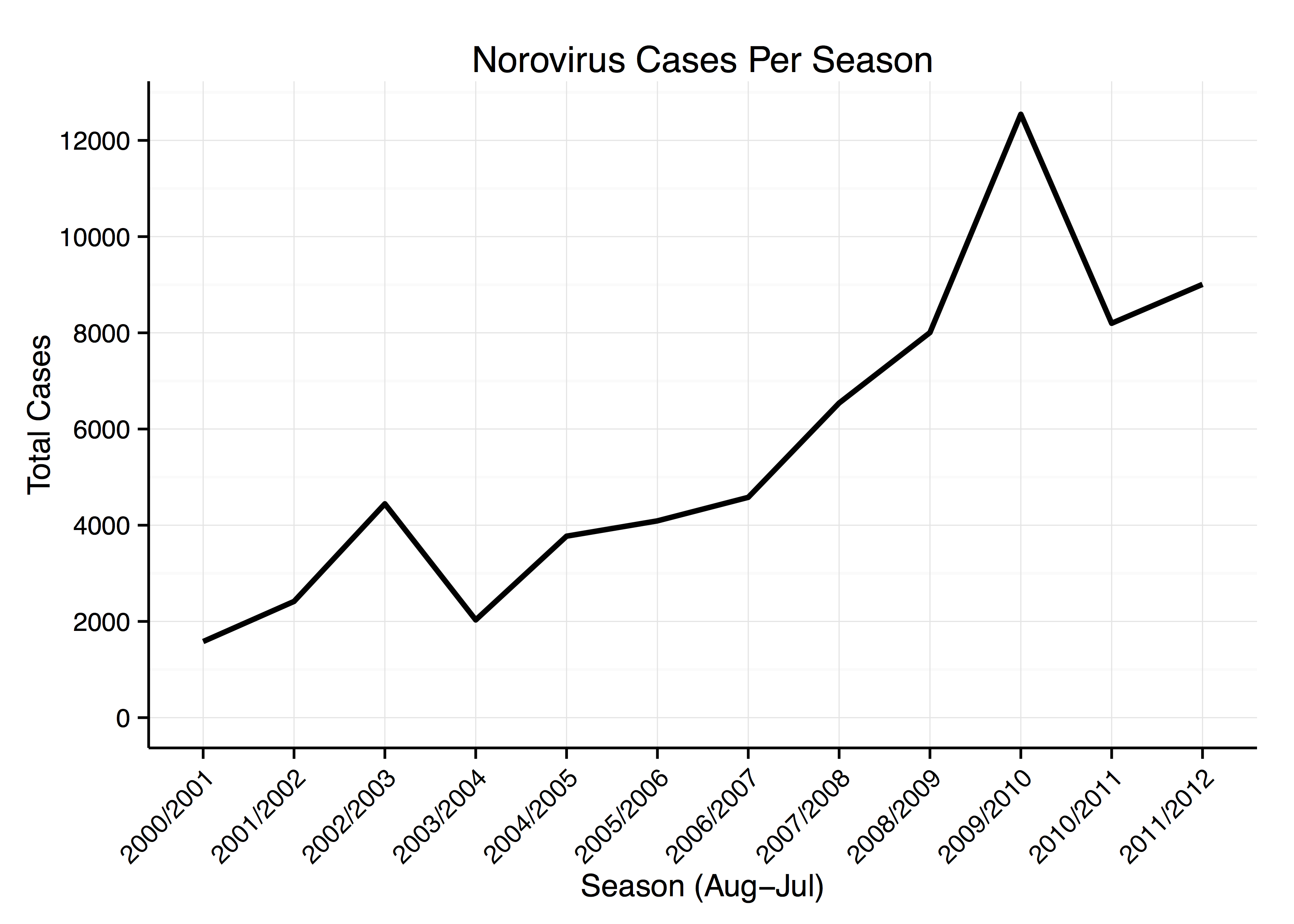
Laboratory reports of norovirus infections in England and Wales 2000–2012. Source: HPA, NB Testing methods changed in 2007.

Norovirus causes about 18% of all cases of acute gastroenteritis worldwide. It is relatively common in developed countries and in low-mortality developing countries (20% and 19%, respectively) compared to high-mortality developing countries (14%). Proportionately, it causes more illness in people in the community or in hospital outpatients (24% and 20% respectively) as compared with hospital inpatients (17%), in whom other causes are more common. Norovirus is considered to be an extremely contagious virus, with a basic reproduction number ($R_0$) estimated around 7.2; the estimated R0 also ranges from 2.1 to as high as 14, based on different conditions. As few as 10 Norovirus virions are needed to infect a person.

Age and emergence of new norovirus strains do not appear to affect the proportion of gastroenteritis attributable to norovirus.

In the United States, the estimated annual number of norovirus cases in 2023 was 21 million, representing a rate of 6,270 cases per 100,000 individuals.

Norovirus is a common cause of epidemics of gastroenteritis on cruise ships. The CDC, through its Vessel Sanitation Program, records and investigates outbreaks of gastrointestinal illness – mostly caused by norovirus – on cruise ships with both a US and foreign itinerary; there were 12 in 2015, and 10 from 1 January to 9 May 2016. An outbreak may affect over 25% of passengers, and a smaller proportion of crew members.

== Human genetics ==
Epidemiological studies have shown that individuals with different ABO(H) (histo-blood group) phenotypes are infected with NoV strains in a genotype-specific manner. GII.4 includes global epidemic strains and binds to more histo-blood group antigens than other genogroups. FUT2 fucosyltransferase transfers a fucose sugar to the end of the ABO(H) precursor in gastrointestinal cells and saliva glands. The ABH-antigen produced is thought to act as a receptor for human norovirus: A non-functional fucosyltransferase FUT2 provides high protection from the most common norovirus strain, GII.4.

Homozygous carriers of any nonsense mutation in the FUT2 gene are called non-secretors, as no ABH-antigen is produced. Approximately 20% of Caucasians are non-secretors due to G428A and C571T nonsense mutations in FUT2 and therefore have strong – although not absolute – protection from the norovirus GII.4. Non-secretors can still produce ABH antigens in erythrocytes, as the precursor is formed by FUT1. Some norovirus genotypes (GI.3) can infect non-secretors.

== History ==
The norovirus was originally named the "Norwalk agent" after Norwalk, Ohio, in the United States, where an outbreak of acute gastroenteritis occurred among children at Bronson Elementary School in November 1968. In 1972, electron microscopy on stored human stool samples identified a virus, which was given the name "Norwalk virus". Numerous outbreaks with similar symptoms have been reported since. The cloning and sequencing of the Norwalk virus genome showed that these viruses have a genomic organization consistent with viruses belonging to the family Caliciviridae. The name "norovirus" (Norovirus for the genus) was approved by the International Committee on Taxonomy of Viruses (ICTV) in 2002. In 2011, however, a press release and a newsletter were published by ICTV, which strongly encouraged the media, national health authorities, and the scientific community to use the virus name Norwalk virus, rather than the genus name Norovirus when referring to outbreaks of the disease. This was also a public response by ICTV to the request from an individual in Japan to rename the Norovirus genus because of the possibility of negative associations for people in Japan and elsewhere who have the family name "Noro". Before this position of ICTV was made public, ICTV consulted widely with members of the Caliciviridae Study Group and carefully discussed the case.

In addition to "Norwalk agent" and "Norwalk virus", the virus has also been called "Norwalk-like virus", "small, round-structured viruses" (SRSVs), Spencer flu, and "Snow Mountain virus". Common names of the illness caused by noroviruses still in use include "Roskilde illness", "winter vomiting disease", "winter vomiting bug", "viral gastroenteritis", and "acute nonbacterial gastroenteritis".

== See also ==
- Norovirus cis-acting replication element
- Norovirus GII.4 Sydney
