= No Toilet, No Bride =

Public health campaign in Haryana, India

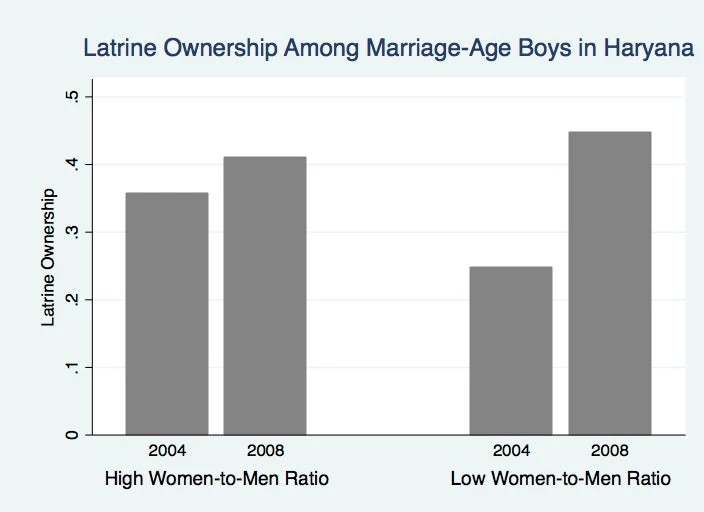
Change in latrine ownership among marriage-age men in Haryana was substantially greater in areas with fewer marriage-aged women

No Toilet, No Bride is a public health campaign launched in 2005 by the state authorities in Haryana, India. The initiative encouraged young women to refuse to marry men unless their homes had latrines. The campaign sought to combat fecal pollution and disease caused by open defecation, which was practiced by roughly 70% of rural households in Haryana at the time of the campaign's launch. It also aimed to combat harassment and staring from men directed at women while defecating, urinating, and attending to menstrual hygiene in the open. As a result of the harassment, women defecated openly only at night and were attacked, with "numerous cases of sexual assault" in rural Haryana communities.

Given that private latrines were particularly valued by women, the campaigners took advantage of marriage arrangement as a moment of singular social power for women in Haryana. State authorities placed billboards, posters, and radio advertisements promoting slogans such as "No Toilet, No Bride" and "No Loo, No 'I Do'" to encourage women and their families to demand the construction of a latrine at the patrilocal home as a precondition for marriage. Village walls were also painted with the phrase "I won't allow my daughter to marry into a home without toilets" in Hindi.

In 2011, The Deccan Herald reported that bridal families in Delhi had begun asking whether the groom's family has a latrine before proceeding with negotiations. A 2012 study found that the campaign led to a 15% increase in male investment in sanitation in Haryana, with a much larger effect in marriage markets with more men than women (26%) compared to areas with more women than men (6%). A 2017 study by the same researcher found that the No Toilet, No Bride initiative led to a 21% increase in private bathrooms in Haryana households "with boys active on the marriage market", while households without such boys saw no significant effect. The campaign's results indicated that skewed local sex ratios increase the bargaining power of women to demand goods and conditions on the marriage market.

In 2013, the authorities in Sehore district made it mandatory for prospective grooms to submit photos of themselves posing with a functioning toilet in their homes in order to register for mass marriage events and receive certain benefits. In 2017 a scheduled caste community in Sheopur made certificates of functioning toilets mandatory for marriage, and 1,200 mostly Muslim representatives from 110 villages across Haryana, Punjab, and Himachal Pradesh "unanimously decided" not to marry their daughters to families that lacked toilets, thus requiring certificates confirming that grooms have a functioning toilet in their home in order for the marriage to be solemnized. That same year, Ghanaian politician Cecilia Dapaah proposed the adoption of the "No Toilet, No Bride" demand in Ghana.

== See also ==
- Take Poo to the Loo
