= Hepatitis A virus cis-acting replication element =

In molecular biology, the hepatitis A virus cis-acting replication element (CRE) is an RNA element which is found in the coding region of the RNA-dependent RNA polymerase in hepatitis A virus (HAV). It is larger than the CREs found in related Picornavirus species, but is thought to be functionally similar. It is thought to be involved in uridylylation of VPg.

== See also ==
- Hepatitis C virus cis-acting replication element
