= Open defecation =

Humans defecating outside rather than into a toilet

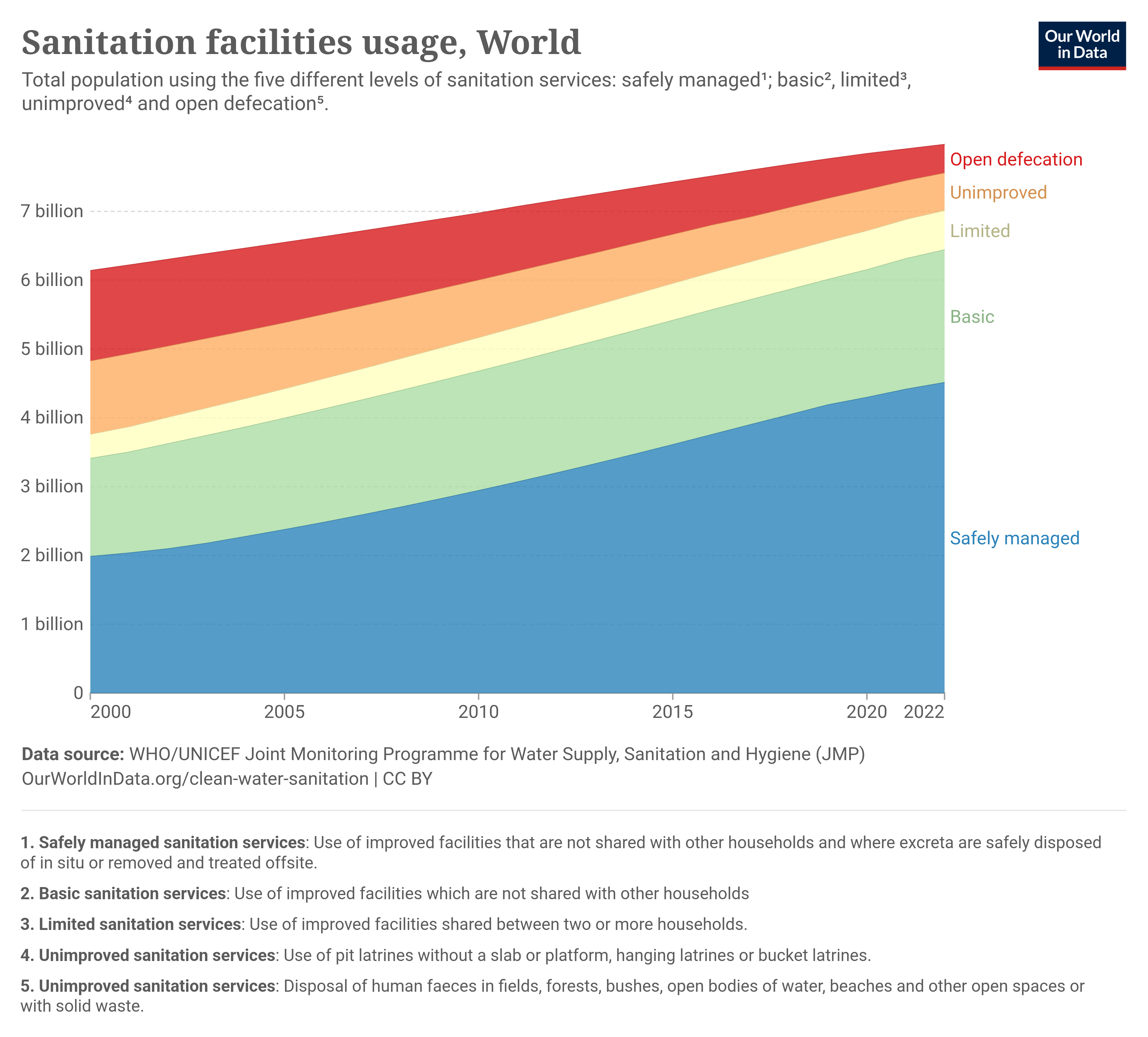
Sanitation facilities coverage worldwide from 2000 to 2022; open defecation in red

Open defecation is the human practice of defecating outside ("in the open") rather than into a toilet. People may choose fields, bushes, forests, ditches, streets, canals, or other open spaces for defecation. They do so either because they do not have a toilet readily accessible or due to archaic traditional cultural practices. The practice is common where sanitation infrastructure and services are not available. Even if toilets are available, behavior change efforts may still be needed to promote the use of toilets. 'Open defecation free' (ODF) is a term used to describe communities that have shifted to using toilets instead of open defecation. This can happen, for example, after community-led total sanitation programs have been implemented.

Open defecation can pollute the environment including water bodies which can bring about health issues, outbreak of diseases and can lead to death. High levels of open defecation are linked to high child mortality, poor nutrition, poverty, and large disparities between rich and poor. Ending open defecation is an indicator being used to measure progress towards the Sustainable Development Goal Number 6. Extreme poverty and lack of sanitation are statistically linked. Therefore, eliminating open defecation is thought to be an important part of the effort to eliminate poverty, reduce the exposure to infections and lower health risks as well as improve human health. This makes the environment clean and therefore improve lives.

In 2022, 420 million people (5.25% of the global population) were practicing open defecation, a significant decline from about 1.31 billion (21.42%) in 2000, representing a reduction of 890 million people or 16.17% points over 22 years. Of those practicing open defecation, 275 million (65.6%) were living in just seven countries. In India, for example, the number had decreased by 62% (73% in 2000 to 7% in 2024), showcasing the country's significant efforts to achieve Sustainable Development Goals by 2030. However, despite the progress, India still had the largest number of people practicing open defecation followed by Nigeria, Ethiopia, Niger and Pakistan, as of 2023 according to the World Bank.

== Overview ==
In ancient times, when there were more open spaces and less population pressure on land, open defecation was a common practice which brought fewer health and hygiene problems. With development and urbanization, open defecating started becoming an important public health issue, and an issue of human dignity. With the increase in population in smaller areas, such as cities and towns, more attention was given to hygiene and health. As a result, there was an increase in global attention towards reducing the practice of open defecation.

Open defecation perpetuates the vicious cycle of disease and poverty and is widely regarded as an affront to personal dignity. The countries where open defecation is most widely practiced have the highest numbers of deaths of children under the age of five, as well as high levels of undernutrition, high levels of poverty, and large disparities between people of means and the poor.

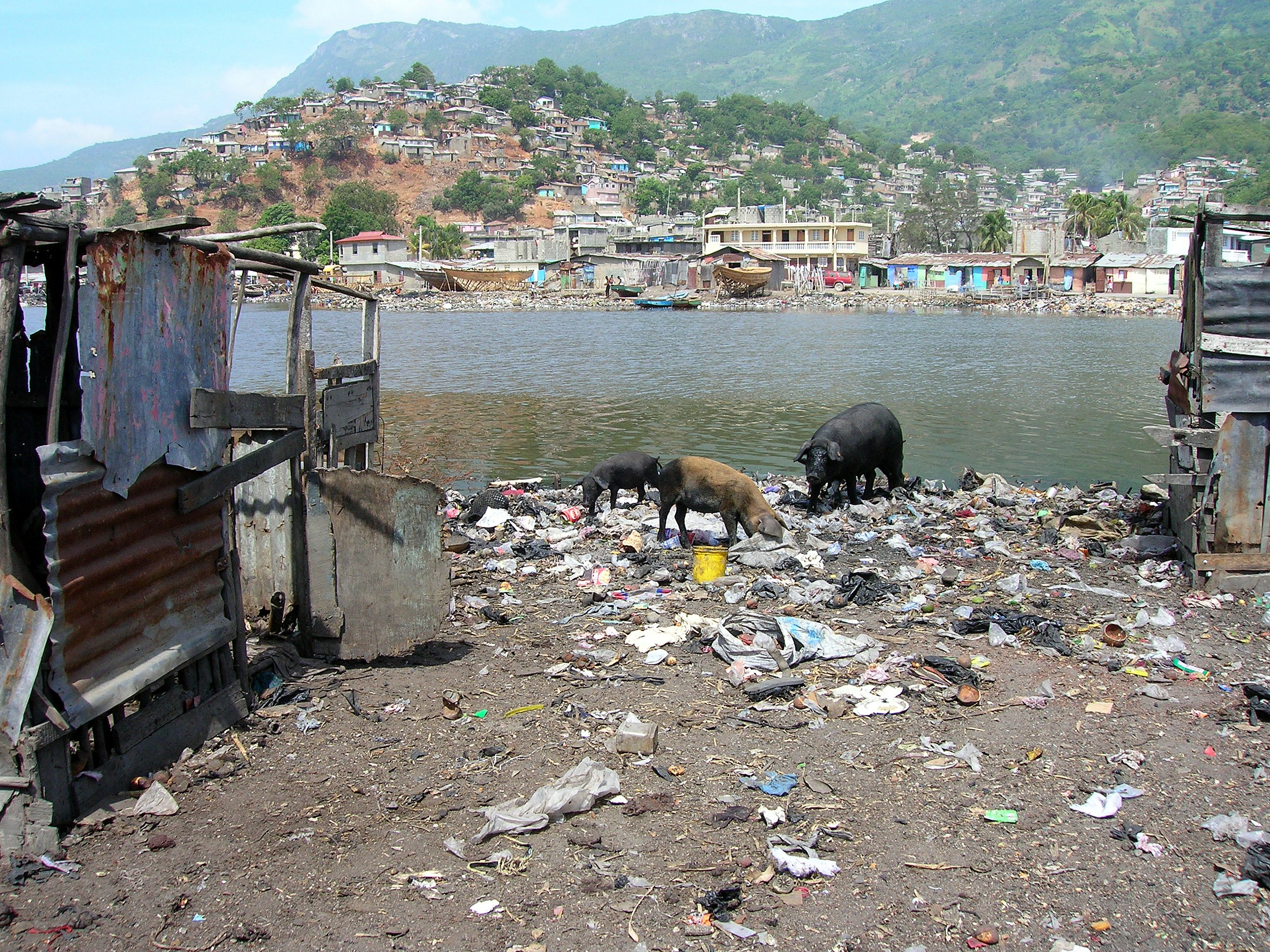
Indiscriminate waste dumping and open defecation (from animals), Shadda, Cap-Haitien, Haiti

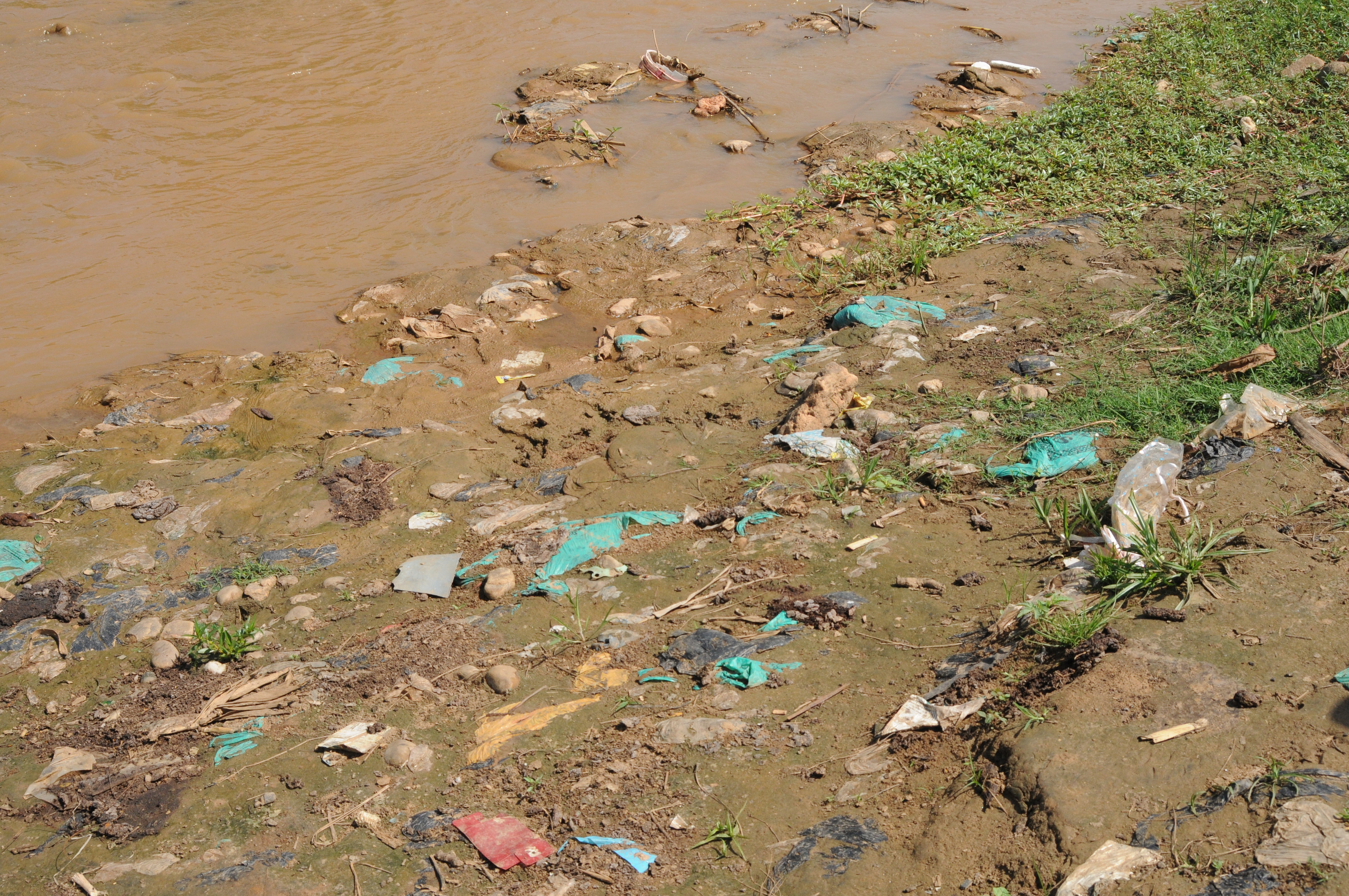
Evidence of open defecation along a riverbank in Bujumbura, Burundi

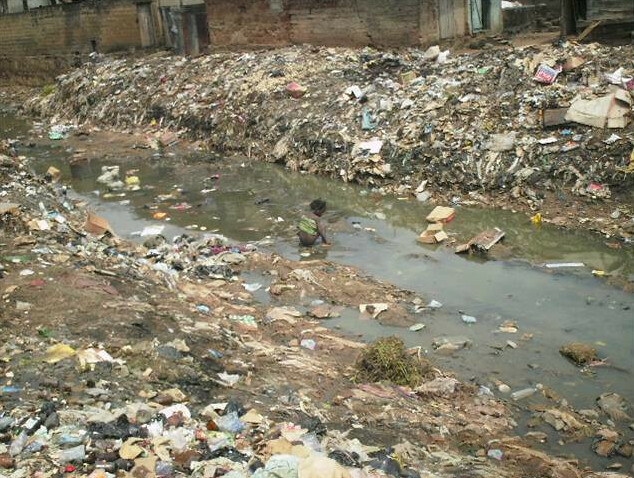
Child defecating in the open in a canal in the slum of Gege in the city of Ibadan, Nigeria

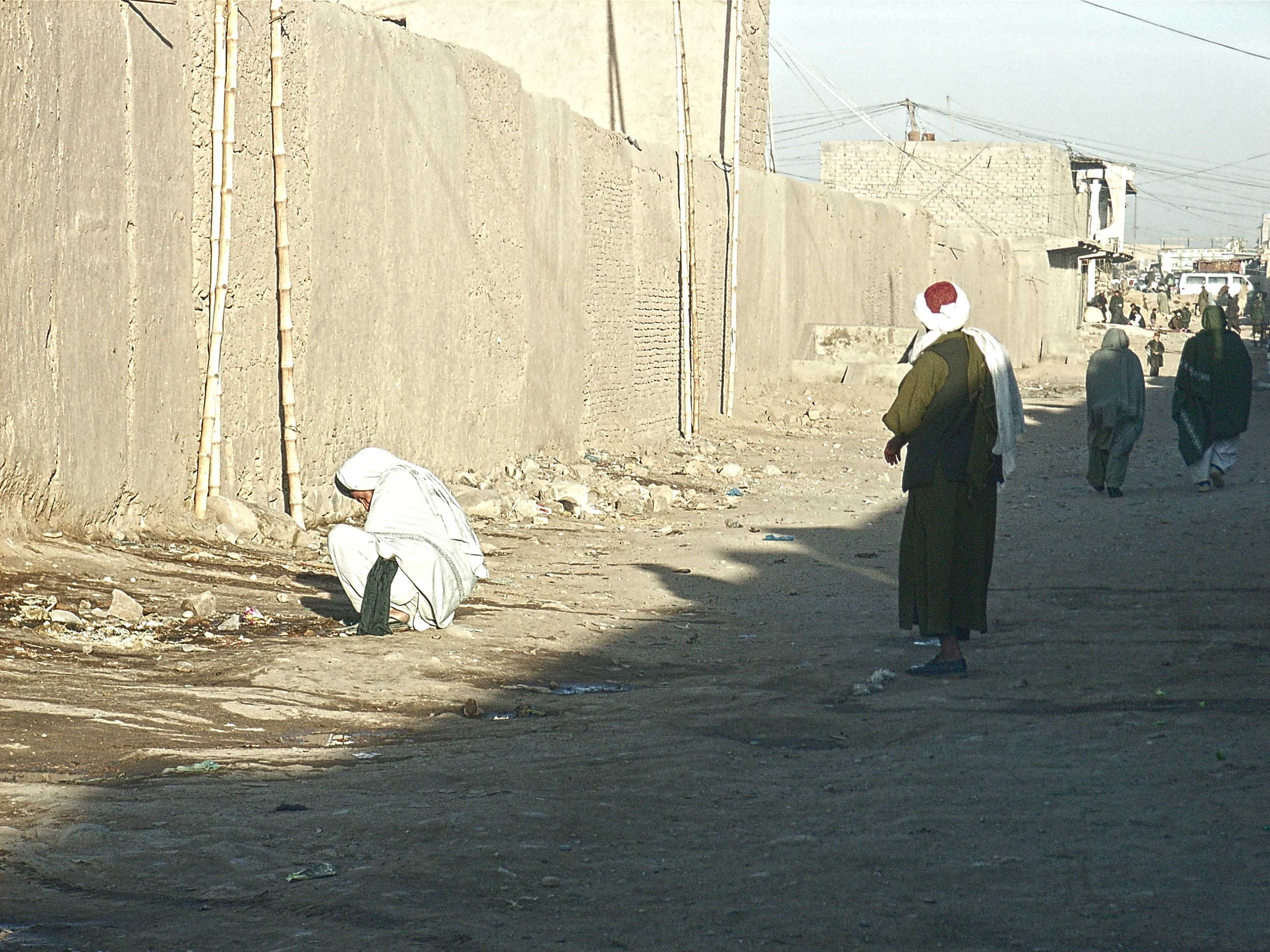
Open defecation, Tirin Kowt bazaar, Afghanistan

== Terminology ==
The term open defecation became widely used in the water, sanitation, and hygiene (WASH) sector from about 2008 onwards. This was due to the publications by the Joint Monitoring Programme for Water Supply and Sanitation (JMP) and the UN International Year of Sanitation. The JMP is a joint program by WHO and UNICEF that was earlier tasked to monitor the water and sanitation targets of the Millennium development goals (MDGs); it is now tasked to monitor Sustainable Development Goal Number 6.

For monitoring of the MDG Number 7, two categories were created: 1) improved sanitation and (2) unimproved sanitation. Open defecation falls into the category of unimproved sanitation. This means that people who practice open defecation do not have access to improved sanitation.

In 2013, World Toilet Day was celebrated as an official UN day for the first time. The term "open defecation" was used in high-level speeches, which helped to draw global attention to this issue (for example, in the "call to action" on sanitation issued by the Deputy Secretary-General of the United Nations in March 2013).

=== Open defecation free ===
Open defecation free (ODF) is a phrase first used in community-led total sanitation (CLTS) programs. ODF has now entered use in other contexts. The original meaning of ODF stated that all community members are using sanitation facilities (such as toilets) instead of going to the open for defecation. This definition was improved and more criteria were added in some countries that have adopted the CLTS approach in their programs to stop the practice of open defecation.

The Indian Ministry of Drinking Water and Sanitation in mid-2015 defined ODF as "the termination of fecal–oral transmission, defined by:

1. No visible feces found in the environment or village and
2. Every household as well as public/community institutions using safe technology option for disposal of feces".

Here, a "safe technology option" means a toilet that contains feces so that there is no contamination of surface soil, groundwater or surface water; flies or animals do not come in contact with the open feces; no one handles excreta; there is no smell and there are no visible feces around in the environment. This definition is part of the Swachh Bharat Abhiyan (Clean India Campaign).

== Reasons ==
The reasons for open defecation are varied. It can be a voluntary, semi-voluntary or involuntary choice. Most of the time, a lack of access to a toilet is the reason. However, in some places even people with toilets in their houses prefer to defecate in the open.

A few broad factors that result in the practice of open defecation are listed below.

=== No toilet ===
Open defecation frequently occurs when people lack toilets in their houses, or in the areas where they live. Lack of toilets in places away from people's houses, such as in schools or on farms, also leads people to defecate in the open. Another example is a lack of public toilets in cities, whether by a reluctance among businesses to allow patrons to use their toilets or limited hours (e.g. if there are no 24-hour businesses in town and someone needs to use the toilet after regular business hours), which can be a big problem for homeless people.

In some rural communities, toilets are used for other purposes, such as storing household items, animals, or farm products or use as kitchens. In such cases, people go outside to defecate.

=== Uncomfortable or unsafe toilet ===
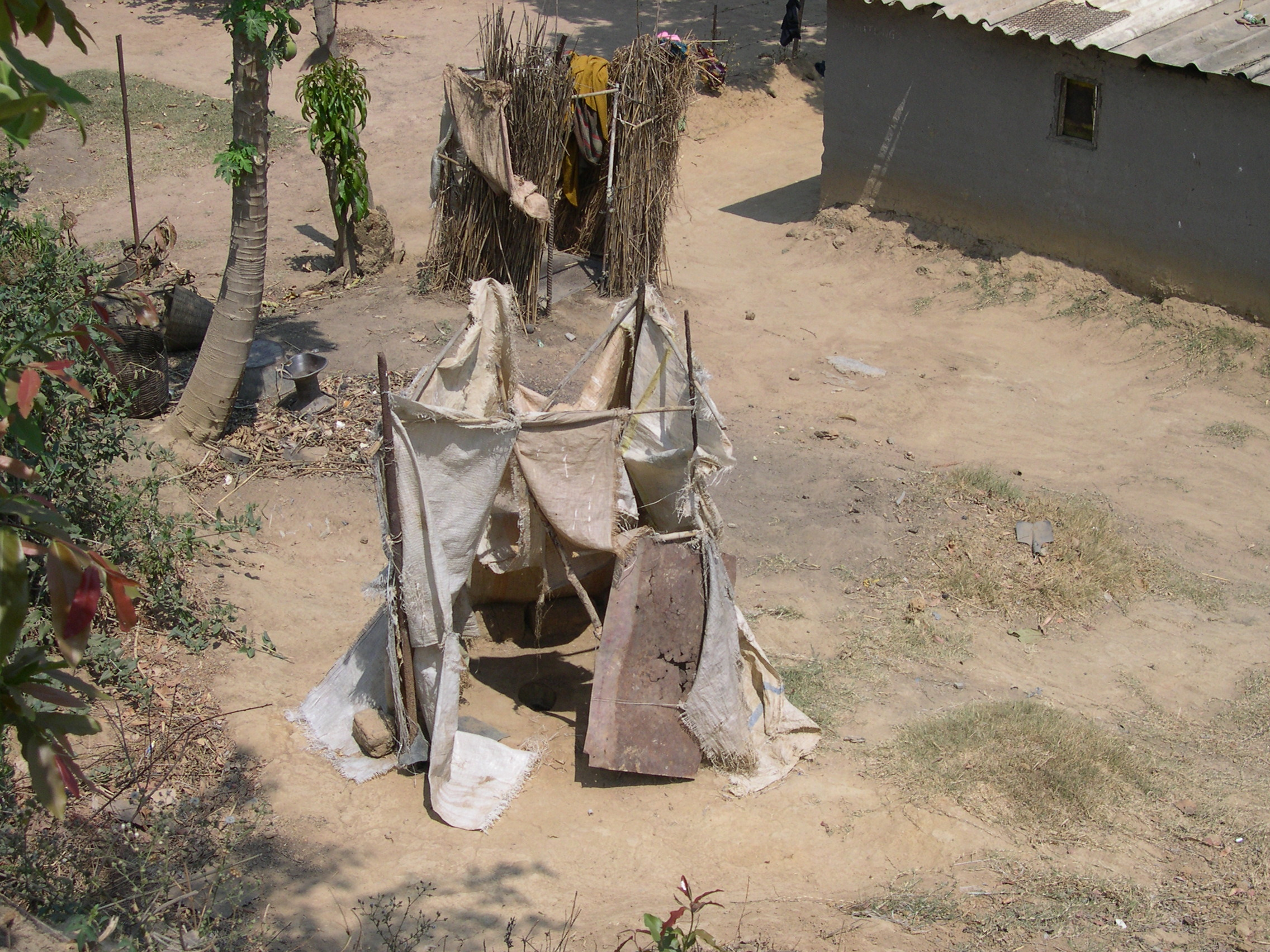
A pit latrine with failing superstructure in Zambia

Sometimes people have access to a toilet, but the toilet might be broken, or of poor quality – outdoor toilets (pit latrines in particular) typically are devoid of any type of cleaning and have strong unpleasant odors. Some toilets are not well lit at all times, especially in areas that lack electricity. Others lack doors or may not have water. Toilets with maggots or cockroaches are also disliked by people, so they go outside to defecate.

Some toilets are risky to access. There may be a risk to personal safety due to lack of lights at night, criminals around them, or the presence of animals such as snakes and dogs. Women and children who do not have toilets inside their houses are often found to be scared to access shared or public toilets, especially at night. Accessing toilets that are not located in the house might be a problem for disabled people, especially at night. In some parts of the world, Zambia for example, very young children are discouraged from using pit latrines due to the risk of falling through the open drop-hole. Some toilets do not have a real door, but have a cloth hung as a door. In some communities, toilets are located in places where women are shy to access them due to the presence of men.

If there is no water supply, people may need to get water from a distance before using the toilet. This is an additional task and needs extra time.

If too many people want to use a toilet at the same time, some people may go outside to defecate instead of waiting. In some cases, people might not be able to wait due to diarrhea or other gastric urgency. In the case of home pit latrines, some people fear that their toilet pits will get filled very fast if all family members use them every day, so they continue to go outside to delay the toilet pit filling up.

=== Unrelated to toilet infrastructure ===
Some communities have safe and accessible toilets, yet people prefer to defecate in the open. In some cases, these toilets are provided by the government or other organizations and people do not like them, do not value them, or do not know the benefits of using them. They continue to defecate in the open. Older people are often found to defecate in the open and are hesitant to change their behavior and go inside a closed toilet.

Some people prefer being in nature while defecating, as opposed to an enclosed space. This happens mostly in less populated or rural areas, where people walk outside early in the morning and go to defecate in the fields or bushes. In some cases there may be a cultural or habitual preference for open defecation. Some consider it a social activity, especially women who like to take some time to go out of their homes. While on their way to the fields for open defecation they can talk to other women and take care of their animals.

Open defecation is a part of people's life and daily habits in some regions. For instance, a 2011 survey in rural East Java, Indonesia, found that many men considered the practice 'normal', and having distinct benefits such as social interaction and physical comfort. In some cultures, there may be social taboos, such as a father-in-law may not use the same toilet as a daughter-in-law in the same household. Open defecation is a preferred practice in some parts of the world, with many respondents in a survey from 2015 stating that "open defecation was more pleasurable and desirable than latrine use". In some societies, open defecation is an intentional and widely used means of fertilization.

People with fecal incontinence can have abrupt 'emergencies' and not enough time to access a toilet, which can make open defecation their only option in such scenarios.

=== Public defecation for other reasons ===
In developed countries, open defecation can be due to homelessness. Open defecation in developed areas is also considered to be a part of recreational outdoor activities such as camping in remote areas. It is difficult to estimate how many people practice open defecation in these communities.

== Prevalence and trends ==
People practicing open defecation of population

=== Countries with high numbers ===
The practice of open defecation is strongly related to poverty and exclusion, particularly in the case of rural areas and informal urban settlements in developing countries. The Joint Monitoring Programme for Water Supply and Sanitation (JMP) of UNICEF and WHO has been collecting data regarding open defecation prevalence worldwide. The figures are segregated by rural and urban areas and by levels of poverty. This program is tasked to monitor progress towards the Millennium Development Goal (MDG) relating to drinking water and sanitation. As open defecation is one example of unimproved sanitation, it is being monitored by JMP for each country, and results are published on a regular basis. The figures on open defecation used to be lumped together with other figures on unimproved sanitation but are collected separately since 2010.

The number of people practicing open defecation fell from 20% in 2000 to 12% in 2015. In 2016, the estimate was for 892 million people with no sanitation facility whatsoever and therefore practicing open defecation (in gutters, behind bushes, in open water bodies, etc.). Most people (9 of 10) who practice open defecation live in rural areas, but the vast majority lives in two regions (Central Africa and South Asia). In 2016, 76% (678 million) of the 892 million people practicing open defecation in the world lived in just seven countries.

Countries with Over 1 Million People Who Defecate openly are listed in the table below, based on available data from different years.
Year	Country	Total population as per respective year	Percentage and Number of people who defecate in the open
2022	Afghanistan	40,578,842	9% or 3.6 million
2022	Angola	35,635,029	17% or 6.1 million
2022	Benin	13,759,501	49% or 6.4 million
2022	Bolivia	12,077,154	9% or 1 million
2022	Burkina Faso	22,509,038	34% or 7.6 million
2022	Cambodia	17,201,724	12% or 2 million
2022	Cameroon	27,632,771	4% or 1.1 million
2022	Central African Republic	5,098,039	25% or 1.3 million
2022	Chad	16,244,513	62.6% or 11 million
2022	Colombia	51,737,944	2% or 1.2 million
2022	Democratic Republic of the Congo	102,396,968	12% or 11.7 million
2016	Eritrea	3,124,698	67% or 2.2 million
2022	Ethiopia	125,384,287	17.6%–18% or 21.7 million
2022	Ghana	33,149,152	17% or 5.7 million
2022	Haiti	11,503,606	18% or 2 million
2022	India	1,425,423,212	11% or 157.4 million
2022	Indonesia	278,830,529	4.1% or 11.5 million
2022	Kenya	54,252,461	6% or 3.4 million
2022	Laos	7,559,007	16% or 1.2 million
2022	Liberia	5,373,294	35% or 1.8 million
2022	Ivory Coast	30,395,002	22% or 5.9 million
2022	Madagascar	30,437,261	34% or 9.9 million
2022	Mali	23,072,640	5% or 1 million
2022	Mauritania	4,875,637	27% or 1.2 million
2022	Mozambique	32,656,246	20% or 6.4 million
2022	Myanmar	53,756,787	7% or 3.6 million
2022	Nepal	29,715,436	7% or 2.1 million
2022	Niger	25,311,973	64.9% or 17 million
2022	Nigeria	223,150,896	18.4% or 40.3 million
2022	Pakistan	243,700,667	6.7%–7% or 15.9 million
2022	Papua New Guinea	10,203,169	16% or 1.6 million
2022	Philippines	113,964,338	3% or 3.4 million
2022	Senegal	17,651,103	8% or 1.3 million
2022	Sierra Leone	8,276,807	16% or 1.4 million
2022	Somalia	17,801,897	21% or 3.7 million
2022	South Sudan	11,021,177	59.7% or 6.5 million
2020	Sudan	46,789,231	17.3% or 7.6 million
2022	Tanzania	64,711,821	6% or 4.1 million
2022	Togo	9,089,738	39% or 3.4 million
2022	Uganda	47,312,719	4% or 1.8 million
2022	Yemen	38,222,876	8.5% or 2.8 million
2022	Zambia	20,152,938	6% or 1.2 million
2022	Zimbabwe	16,069,056	17% or 2.8 million

=== India ===
This chart depicts the decrease in open defecation from 2000 to 2024 in countries sharing a land border with India, alongside World Bank income classifications. According to the data, around 6.7% of India's population practiced open defecation in 2024.

A campaign to build toilets in urban and rural areas achieved a significant reduction in open defecation between 2014 and 2019. In September 2019, the Bill & Melinda Gates Foundation honored Indian leader Narendra Modi for his efforts in improving sanitation in the country. According to UNICEF, the five-year Swachh Bharat Mission (SBM) had reduced the number of people practicing open defecation by 500 million. There have also been reports of people not using the toilets despite having one, although according to the Indian newspaper The Economic Times, citing government sources, 96% of Indians used the toilets they had as per a World Bank support project. In October 2019, Modi declared India to be "open defecation free".

With the success of the Swachh Bharat Mission, Modi launched Phase 2 from 2020 to 2025. During Phase 2, the government is to focus on segregation of waste and further eliminating open defecation.

=== Pakistan ===
In 2017–18, 94% of Pakistanis had toilet facilities (99% in urban areas, 91% in rural areas), while 6% of the population did not (1% in urban areas, 9% in rural areas). In 2009, sanitation facilities were available to only about 42% of the population, 65% in urban areas and 30% in rural settlements. In 2017, WaterAid reported that 79 million people in Pakistan lacked access to a decent toilet. In 2018, 12% or 26 million people in Pakistan practiced open defecation, according to UNICEF. As of 2022, 7% or 15.92 million people in Pakistan practice open defecation, UNICEF reported.

=== United States ===
An increase in homelessness and the creation of tent cities nationwide have led to an increase in open defecation because of a lack of public toilets. Since the 1970s, many cities have closed public toilets due to concerns over vandalism and drug use.

In San Francisco, open defecation complaints for street feces increased fivefold from 2011 to 2018, with 28,084 cases reported. This was mainly due to the rising amount of homelessness in the city. San Francisco formed the Poop Patrol to deal with the problem. Similar problems were reported in Los Angeles and Miami.

The Mad Pooper was the name given to an unidentified woman who regularly defecated in public places while jogging during summer 2017 in the U.S. city of Colorado Springs.

== Impacts ==
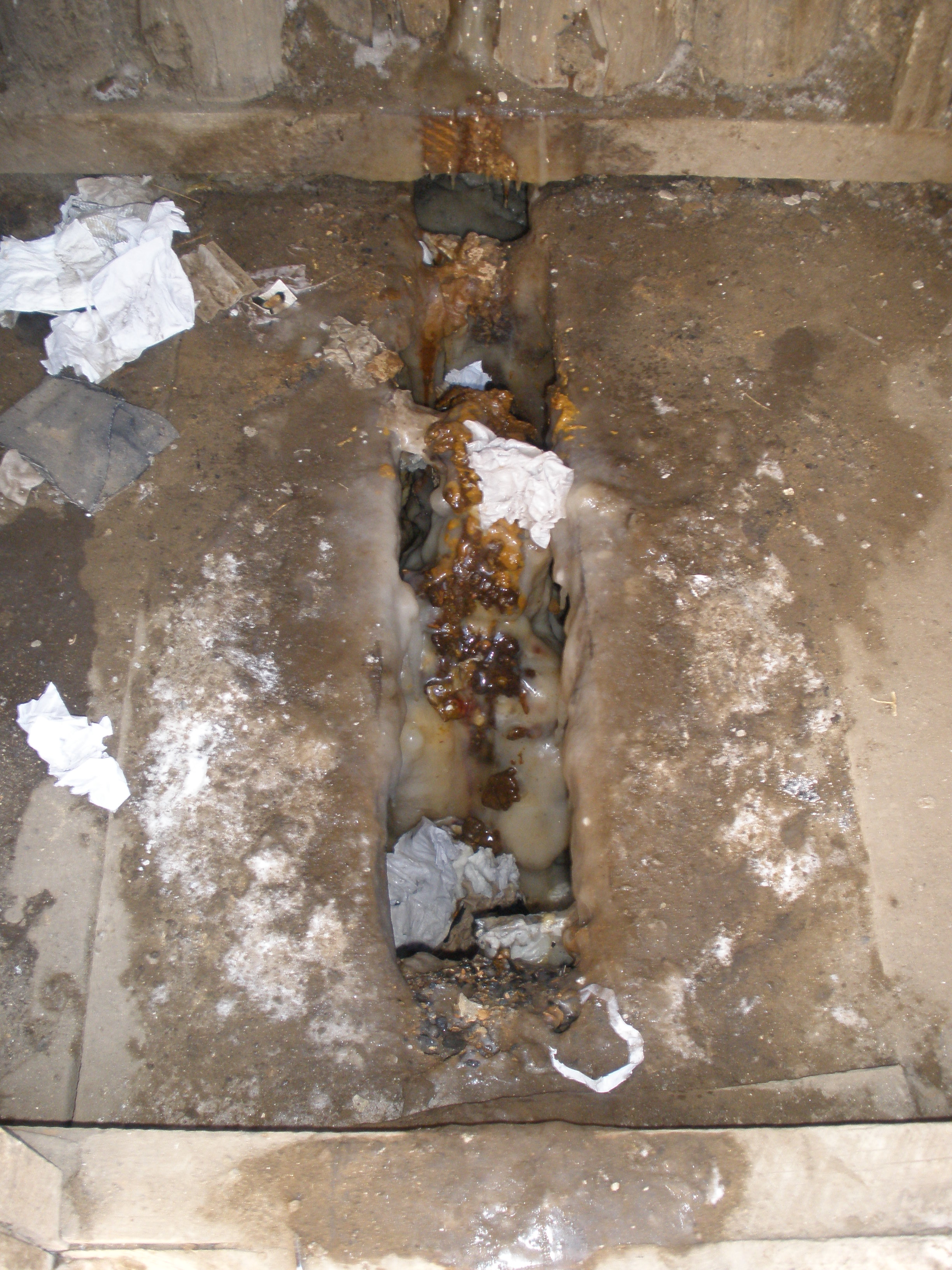
A dirty pit latrine in Mongolia leading people to choose open defecation instead

=== Public health ===
The negative public health impacts of open defecation are the same as those described when there is no access to sanitation at all. Open defecation—and lack of sanitation and hygiene in general—is an important cause of various diseases. The most common are diarrhea and intestinal worm infections, also including typhoid, cholera, hepatitis, polio, trachoma, and others.

Adverse health effects of open defecation occur because open defecation results in fecal contamination of the local environment. Open defecators are repeatedly exposed to many kinds of fecal bacteria like gram-positive Staphylococcus aureus and other fecal pathogens. This is particularly serious for young children whose immune systems and brains are not yet fully developed.

Certain diseases are grouped together under the name of waterborne diseases, which are diseases transmitted via fecal pathogens in water. Open defecation can lead to water pollution when rain flushes feces that are dispersed in the environment into surface water or unprotected wells.

Open defecation was found by the WHO in 2014 to be a leading cause of diarrheal death. In 2013, about 2,000 children under the age of five died every day from diarrhea.

Young children are particularly vulnerable to ingesting feces of other people that are lying around after open defecation, because young children crawl on the ground, walk barefoot, and put things in their mouths without washing their hands. Feces of farm animals are equally a cause of concern when children are playing in the yard.

Those countries where open defecation is most widely practiced have the highest numbers of deaths of children under the age of five, as well as high levels of malnourishment (leading to stunted growth in children), high levels of poverty, and large disparities between rich and poor.

Research from India has shown that detrimental health impacts (particularly for early life health) are even more significant from open defecation when the population density is high: "The same amount of open defecation is twice as bad in a place with a high population density average like India versus a low population density average like sub-Saharan Africa."

Open defecation badly harms health of children and their quality of life, including psychological issues.

=== Safety of women ===
There are strong gender impacts connected with a lack of adequate sanitation. In addition to the universal problems associated with open defecation, having to urinate in the open can also be problematic for females. The lack of safe, private toilets makes women and girls vulnerable to violence and is an impediment to girls' education. Women are at risk of sexual molestation and rape as they search for places to urinate or defecate that are secluded and private, often during hours of darkness.

Lack of privacy has an especially large effect on the safety and sense of dignity of women and girls in developing countries. Facing the shame of having to urinate or defecate in public, they often wait until nightfall to relieve themselves. They risk being attacked after dark, meaning painfully holding their bladder and bowels all day. Women in developing countries increasingly express fear of assault or rape when having to leave the house after dark. Reports of attacks or harassment near or in toilet facilities, as well as near or in areas where women urinate or defecate openly, are common.

== Prevention ==
Strategies that can enable communities, both rural and peri-urban, to become completely open defecation free and remain so include: sanitation marketing, behavior change communication, and 'enhanced' community-led total sanitation ('CLTS + '), supplemented by "nudging".

Several drivers are used to eradicate open defecation, one of which is behavior change. SaniFOAM (Focus on Opportunity, Ability, and Motivation) is a conceptual framework that was developed specifically to address issues of sanitation and hygiene. Using focus, opportunity, ability and motivation as categories of determinants, the SaniFOAM model identifies barriers to latrine adoption while simultaneously serving as a tool for designing, monitoring and evaluating sanitation interventions. The following are some of the key drivers used to fight against open defecation in addition to behavior change:

- Political will
- Sanitation solutions that offer a better value than open defecation
- Stronger public sector local service delivery systems
- Creation of the right incentive structures

=== Integrated initiatives ===
Efforts to reduce open defecation are more or less the same as those to achieve the MDG target on access to sanitation. A key aspect is awareness-raising (for example via the UN World Toilet Day at a global level), behavior change campaigns, and increasing political will and demand for sanitation. Community-Led Total Sanitation (CLTS) campaigns have placed a particular focus on ending open defecation by "triggering" the communities themselves into action.

=== Simple sanitation technology options ===
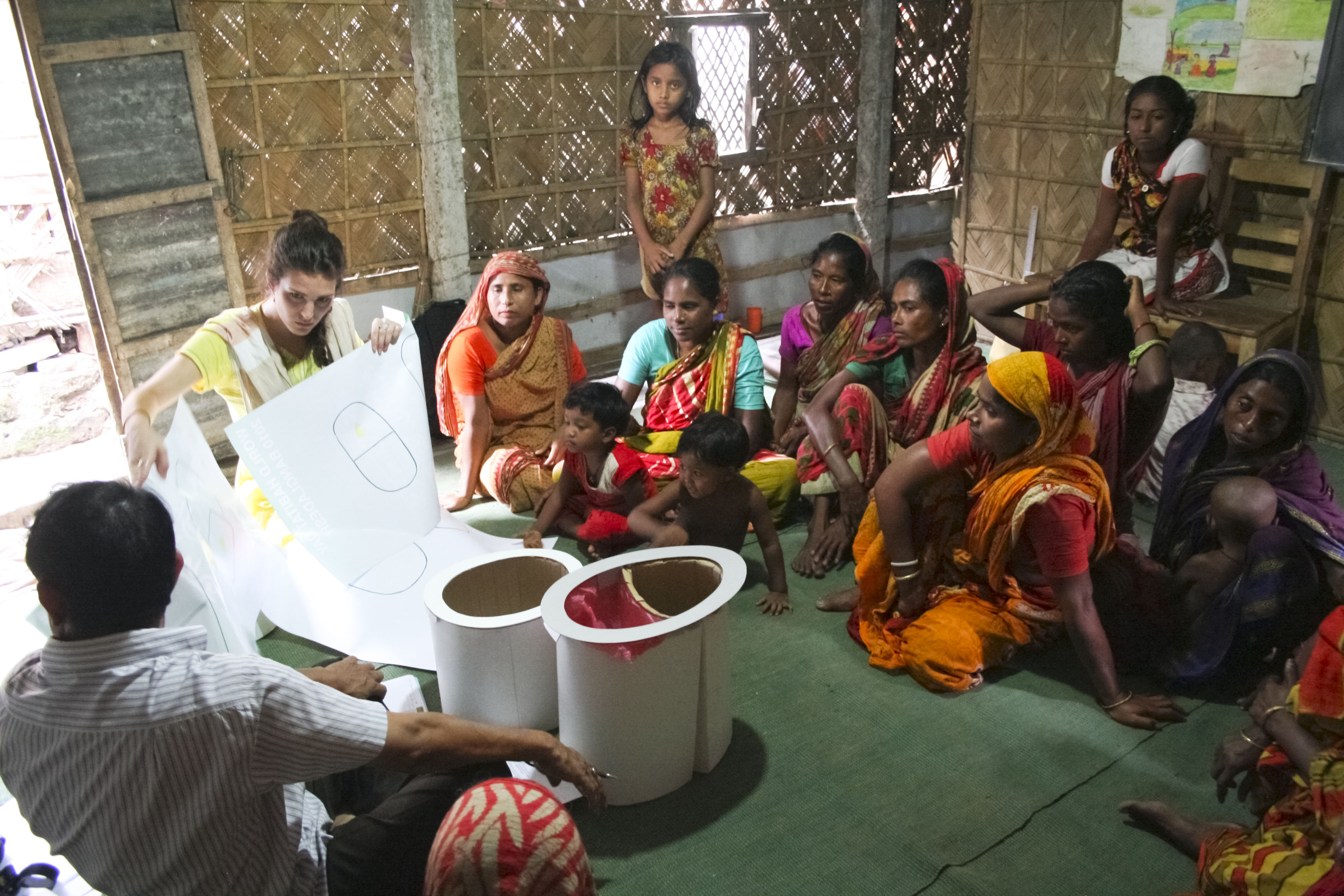
Residents of Mymensingh, Bangladesh, participate in a workshop to discover more about mobile sanitation options (MoSan) as an alternative to open defecation.

Simple sanitation technology options are available to reduce open defecation prevalence if the behavior is due to not having toilets in the household and shared toilets being too far or too dangerous to reach, e.g., at night.

==== Toilet bags ====
Some people use plastic bags (also called flying toilets) to collect and dispose of feces, particularly at night. A more specialized alternative is the "Peepoo" bag developed by the Swedish company, Peepoople. The "Peepoo" bag is a "personal, single-use, self-sanitizing, fully biodegradable toilet that prevents feces from contaminating the immediate area as well as the surrounding ecosystem". This bag is being used in humanitarian responses, schools, and urban slums in developing countries.

==== Bucket toilets and urine diversion ====
Bucket toilets are a simple portable toilet option. They can be upgraded in various ways, one of them being urine diversion, which can make them similar to urine-diverting dry toilets. Urine diversion can significantly reduce odors from dry toilets. Examples of using this type of toilet to reduce open defecation are the "MoSan" toilet (used in Kenya) or the urine-diverting dry toilet promoted by SOIL in Haiti.

== Society and culture ==
=== Media ===
The mainstream media in some affected countries, including India and Pakistan, have recently been publicizing the issue of open defecation.

=== Legal status ===
In certain jurisdictions, open or public defecation is a criminal offense that can be punished with a fine or even imprisonment.

=== In popular culture ===
David Sedaris's essay "Adventures at Poo Corner" dealt with people who openly defecate in commercial businesses.

=== Open defecation during outdoor activities ===
Some national parks prohibit open defecation in some areas. If defecating openly, the general advice is to defecate into a dug hole, and cover with soil.

== See also ==
- EToilet
- Free bleeding
- Public urination
- Sanitation worker
- Spitting
