= Ali Gholi Agha Mosque =

Shi'ite mosque in Isfahan, Iran

- مسجد علی‌قلی‌آقا
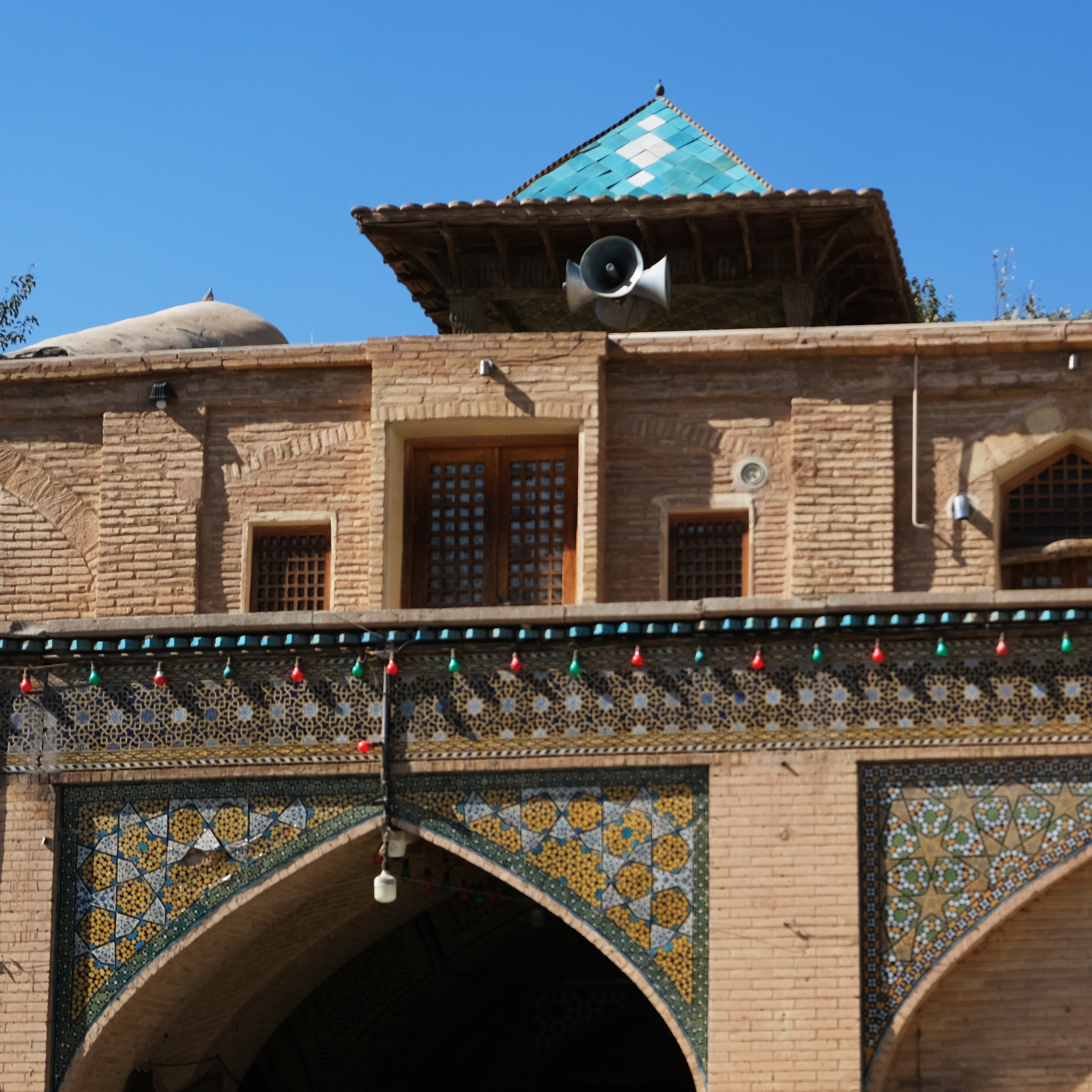

- Location of the mosque in Iran

Religion
- Affiliation: Shia Islam
- Ecclesiastical or organisational status: Mosque
- Status: Active

Location
- Location: Esfahan, Isfahan Province
- Country: Iran
- Coordinates: 32°40′04″N 51°40′04″E

Architecture
- Type: Mosque architecture
- Style: Safavid
- Completed: 1122 AH (1710/1711 CE)
- Materials: Brick; mortar; tiles

Iran National Heritage List
- Official name: Ali Gholi Agha Mosque
- Type: Mosque
- Designated: 1934
- Reference no.: 225
- Conservation organization: Cultural Heritage, Handicrafts and Tourism Organization of Iran

The Ali Gholi Agha Mosque (Persian: مسجد علی‌قلی‌آقا, romanized: Masjid-i Ali Quli Aqa) is a Shi'ite mosque in Esfahan, in the province of Isfahan, Iran. Completed in 1122 AH (1710/1711 CE), the mosque was built in the Safavid style by Ali Gholi Agha, who also built the Ali Gholi Agha hammam.

The mosque was added to the Iran National Heritage List on 13 December 1934, administered by the Cultural Heritage, Handicrafts and Tourism Organization of Iran.

== See also ==
- Shia Islam in Iran
- List of mosques in Iran
- List of historical structures in Isfahan
