= Self-supply of water and sanitation =

Incremental improvements to water and sanitation services, mainly financed by the user

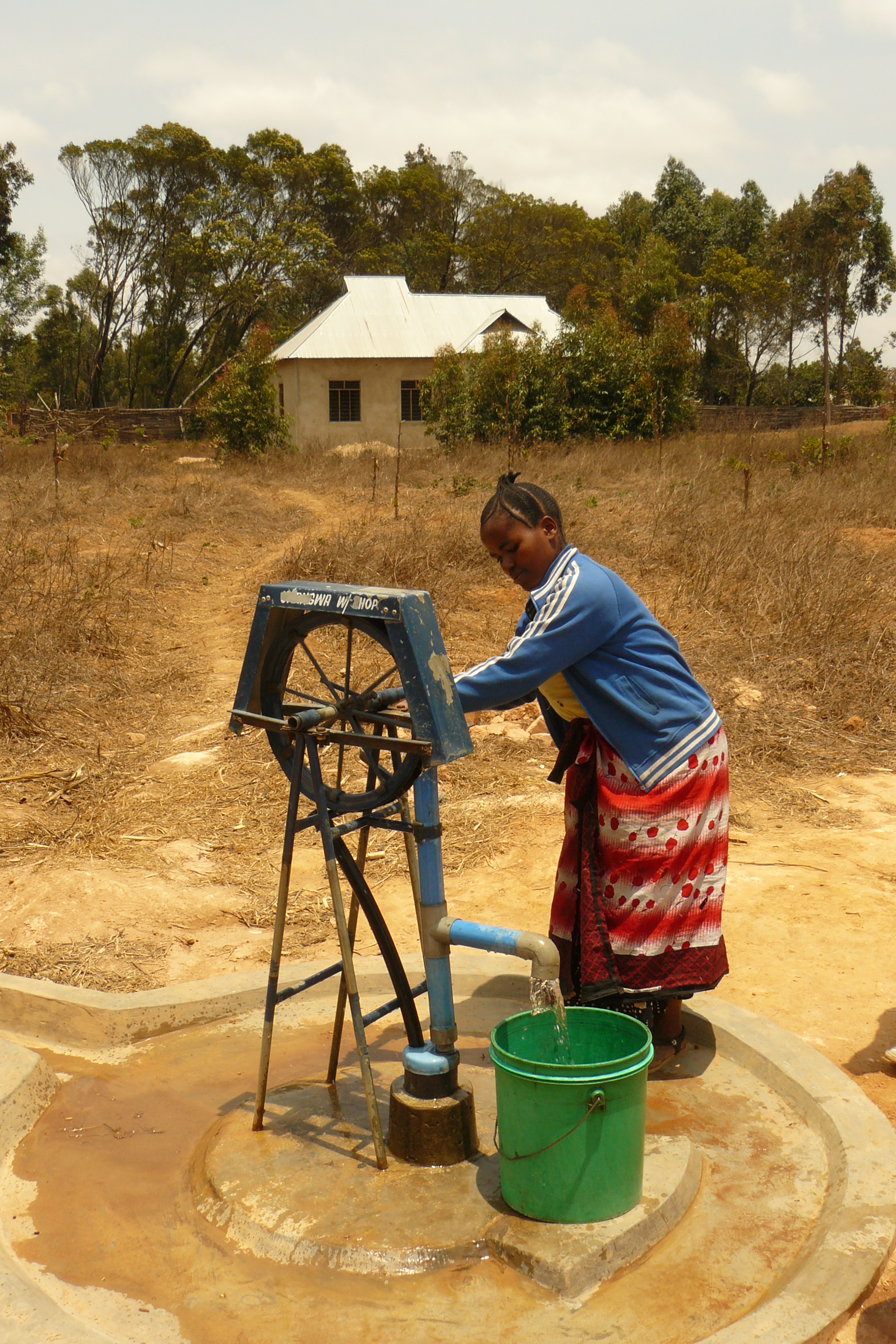
A person using a rope pump in rural Tanzania to obtain groundwater from a well

Self-supply refers to the ability of a buyer of goods and services to create their own supply rather than purchase from a supplier. The term has a particular history and application in relation to water and sanitation, where it refers to an approach of incremental improvements to water and sanitation services, which are mainly financed by the user. In this context, self-supply is also called household-led water supply or individual supply.

People around the world have been using this approach over centuries to incrementally upgrade their water and sanitation services. The approach does not refer to a specific technology or type of water source or sanitation service although it does have to be feasible to use and construct at a low cost and mostly using tools locally available. The approach is rather about an incremental improvement of these services. It is a market-based approach and commonly does not involve product subsidies.

"Self-supply" is different from "supported self-supply". The former term refers to situations where people improve their water and sanitation services on their own, while the latter term refers to a deliberately guided process, usually by a government agency or a non-governmental organization. Many examples of self-supply taking off in a short time come from situations where government-led service provision has broken down, e.g. in countries of the former Soviet Union. The approach can also be deliberately used by government agencies or external support agencies to complement other types of service provision, such as community-managed water supply.

Self-supply is an important strategy, adopted in combination with other approaches such as community-managed services, to achieve the United Nations' Sustainable Development Goals, particularly for Goal 6: "Ensure access to water and sanitation for all".

The term is commonly used in the water sector in the development cooperation context, but less commonly in the sanitation sector. Certain approaches such as community-led total sanitation or container-based sanitation systems have many similar aspects to self-supply. Some organizations use other terms referring to approaches which are led by individual households. For example, the World Health Organization uses the term "individual supply". In the context of developed countries, a related concept is called living "off the grid".

== Definition ==
The short definition of self-supply is: "People improving water and sanitation services by themselves". The basic idea of self-supply is that people are providing water for themselves through their own means without direct government support. Humans have been improving their own access to water and sanitation without government aid for millennia. As an approach to improving access it is a user-centered approach that involves incrementally improving current service levels, most of the time mainly financed by the end users. Generally this means that the improvements to water supply and sanitation are achieved either through labor by the end-users or by the end-users paying a technician or a company to complete the work. The incentives and benefits for the end users to improve their own water and sanitation services privately may include: convenience, proximity to home, larger volume of water, faster services than municipal water systems, cheaper than municipal water systems, lack of municipal water systems, privacy, security, and reliability.

There is no specific technology that is advocated with self-supply. Self-supply is rather an approach of how to improve access to water and sanitation services, commonly referred to as "moving up the water and sanitation ladders". At the bottom of the "water ladder" are unprotected sources of water. The users "climb the water ladder" by adding protection to their water source or additional technology for convenience. For example, a user with an unlined hand dug well with a rope and bucket as a lifting device would be at the bottom of the water ladder. A user with a lined hand dug well would be higher on the water ladder since the water source has a lower risk of contamination due to the lining. A user with a hand pump would have the benefit of being able to get a larger volume of water more quickly than with a bucket, and contamination of the source is reduced. Finally, a user with a motorized pump would have the convenience of not having to expend any manual energy on pumping water. Even sources on the lowest rungs of the ladder would provide service all day, every day, all year round.

In applying self-supply in sanitation, one approach used is that of sanitation marketing. Modularization is a part of the sanitation marketing approach. The sanitation product to be marketed is designed so that upgrades can be made gradually over time, towards an improved sanitation facility, as budget allows.

== Background ==
In 2015, 663 million people worldwide lacked access to improved water sources and 158 million people used surface water as their main source of drinking water (i.e. an "unimproved" water source). 8 out of 10 people without improved drinking water sources live in rural areas. Likewise, 1 in 8 people worldwide practise open defecation (946 million people). These numbers show that there is a continued need to keep improving these services for millions of people.

Self-supply is not formally part of the water strategy to increase access to improved water sources in most developing countries and is not commonly counted in inventories of access to improved water sources. This is partly related to the fact that self-supply does not refer to a specific technology or service level. However, even in countries where significant initiatives of self-supply have been observed, these usually are not taken into consideration in official numbers of service coverage. Ethiopia and Zimbabwe are exceptions to this rule.

=== Costs ===
Studies in Zambia and Zimbabwe showed that by using a strategy combining community-managed water supply and self-supply, the life-cycle costs to the government would be 50% lower, compared to a strategy only using community-managed water supply.

== Approaches for water supply ==
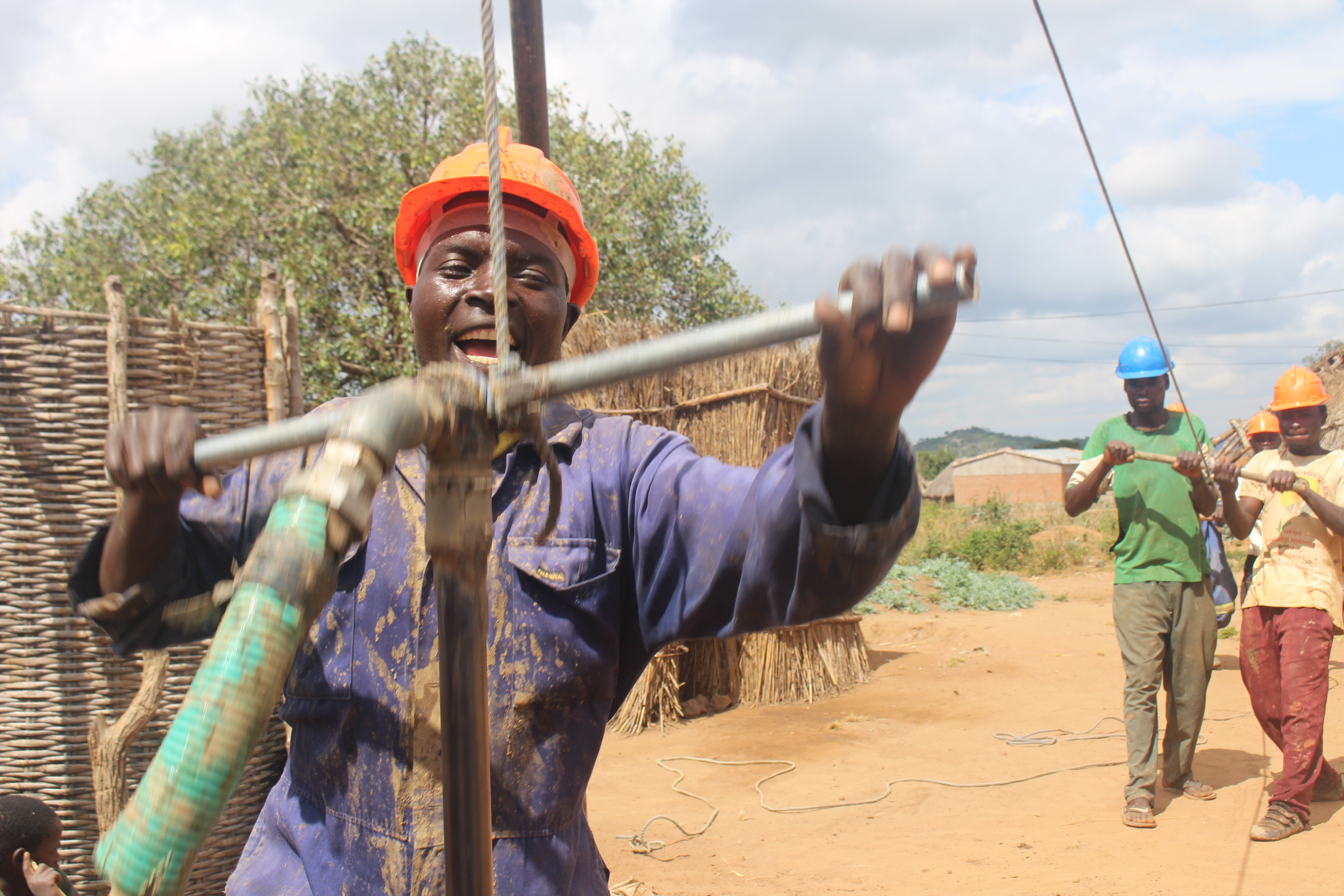
Manual drilling of a well in Tanzania

=== Manually drilled wells ===
A wide range of manual well drilling technology exist in developing countries. Manually driven tube wells are ubiquitous on the coasts of Madagascar. EMAS in Bolivia uses a hybrid percussion-jetting-rotation manual drilling method for the installation of tube wells. Hand-auger drilling is common in Niger where it has been used for the past 30 years. The Manual Drilling Compendium gives a good overview of the status of these technologies worldwide.

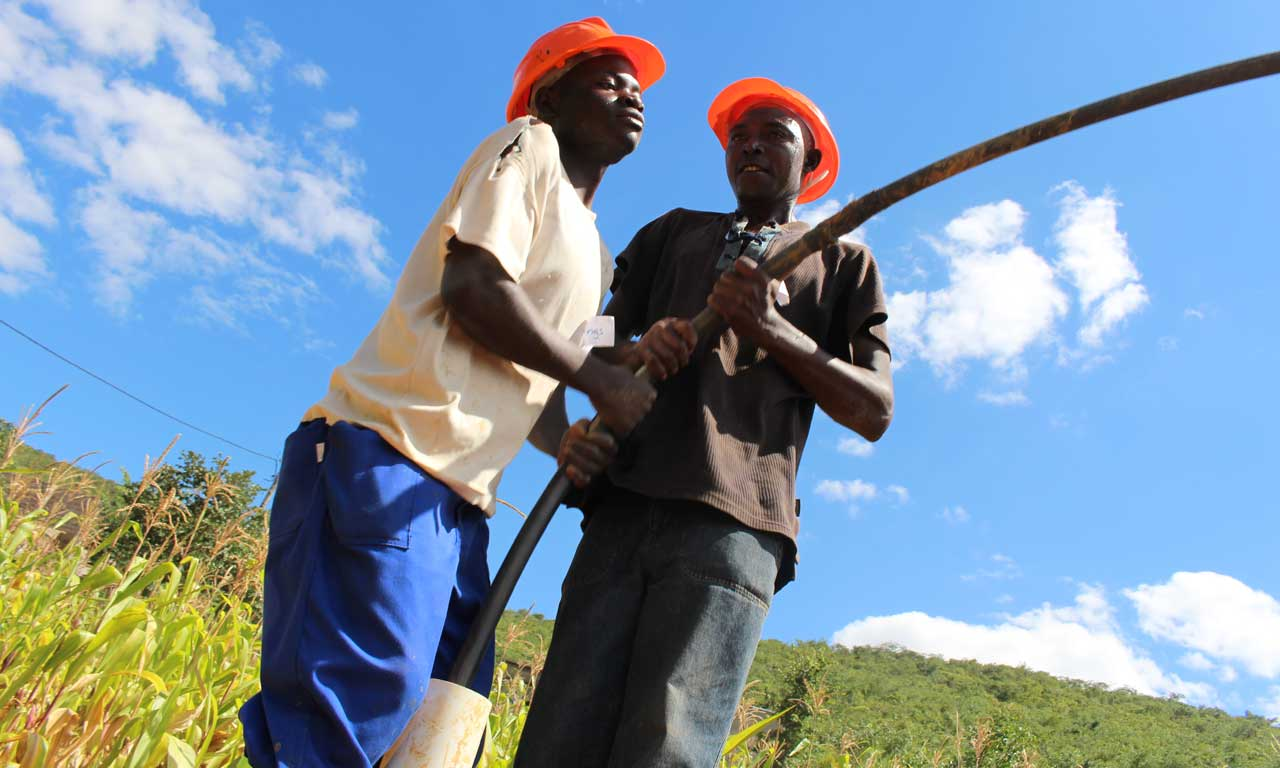
Manual drilling using the "Mzuzu" method

=== Private wells, tube wells, and upgraded family wells ===
United States

In the United States, 44 million people used self-supply and private water sources in 2010, and about 22% of the rural population uses private wells to access groundwater for their water supply.

Eastern Europe

About 20-60% of the population in Eastern Europe and the former Soviet Union relies on self-supply for water. For example, 35% of the population in Ukraine, 57% in Moldova, 38% in Romania, and 22% in Albania rely on self-supply for a water source.

Asia

Bangladesh is one of the cases where self-supply has reached mainstream, with millions of tubewells and hand pumps in use.

Africa

An "Upgraded Family Well" program has been implemented by the Government of Zimbabwe in rural areas to improve the quality of self-supply wells.

=== Rope pumps and pitcher pumps ===
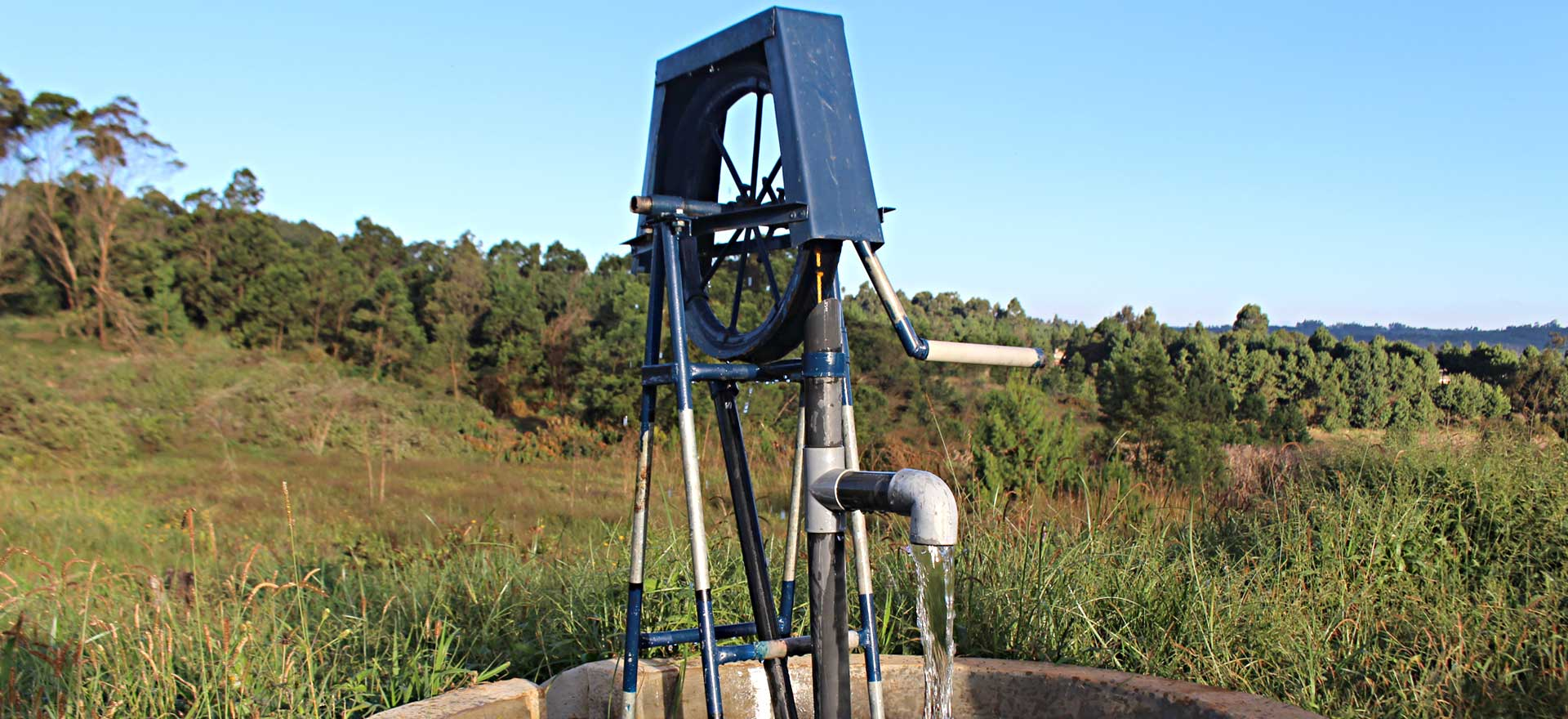
Example of a Rope Pump

A rope pump for self-supply was developed and introduced in Nicaragua in 1990. Since then, thousands of rope pumps have been installed on family wells. For example, as of 2004, about 30,000 rope pumps were installed serving at least 25 percent of rural population.

Pitcher pumps on driven wells are ubiquitous along the coasts of Madagascar. The sandy soils and shallow water tables make it a particularly appropriate technology to use for accessing water. Madagascar's main port of Tamatave, in particular, is estimated to have at a minimum of 9,000 pitcher pump wells servicing 170,000 people, making it one of the largest example of an unsubsidized pump market in sub-Saharan Africa.

Other solutions have focused on innovative pump systems, including hand-pumps, Water for People's "Play Pumps", and Pump Aid's "Elephant Pumps". All three designs are built to aid communities in drawing clean water from wells. The hand pump is the most basic and simple to repair, with replacement parts easily found. Using a more creative approach, Play Pumps combine child's play with clean water extraction through the use of playground equipment, called a roundabout. The idea behind this is as children play on the roundabout, water will simultaneously be pumped from a reservoir tank to either toilets, hand washing stations, or for drinking water. Some downsides to the PlayPump, though, are its inability to address situations of physical water scarcity and the danger of exploitation when children's play is equated with pumping water. Alternatively, Elephant Pumps are simple hand water pumps. After a well is prepared, a rope-pump mechanism is installed that is easy to maintain, uses locally sourced parts, and can be up and running in the time span of about a week. The Elephant Pump can provide 250 people with 40 litres of clean water per person per day.

=== Rainwater harvesting ===
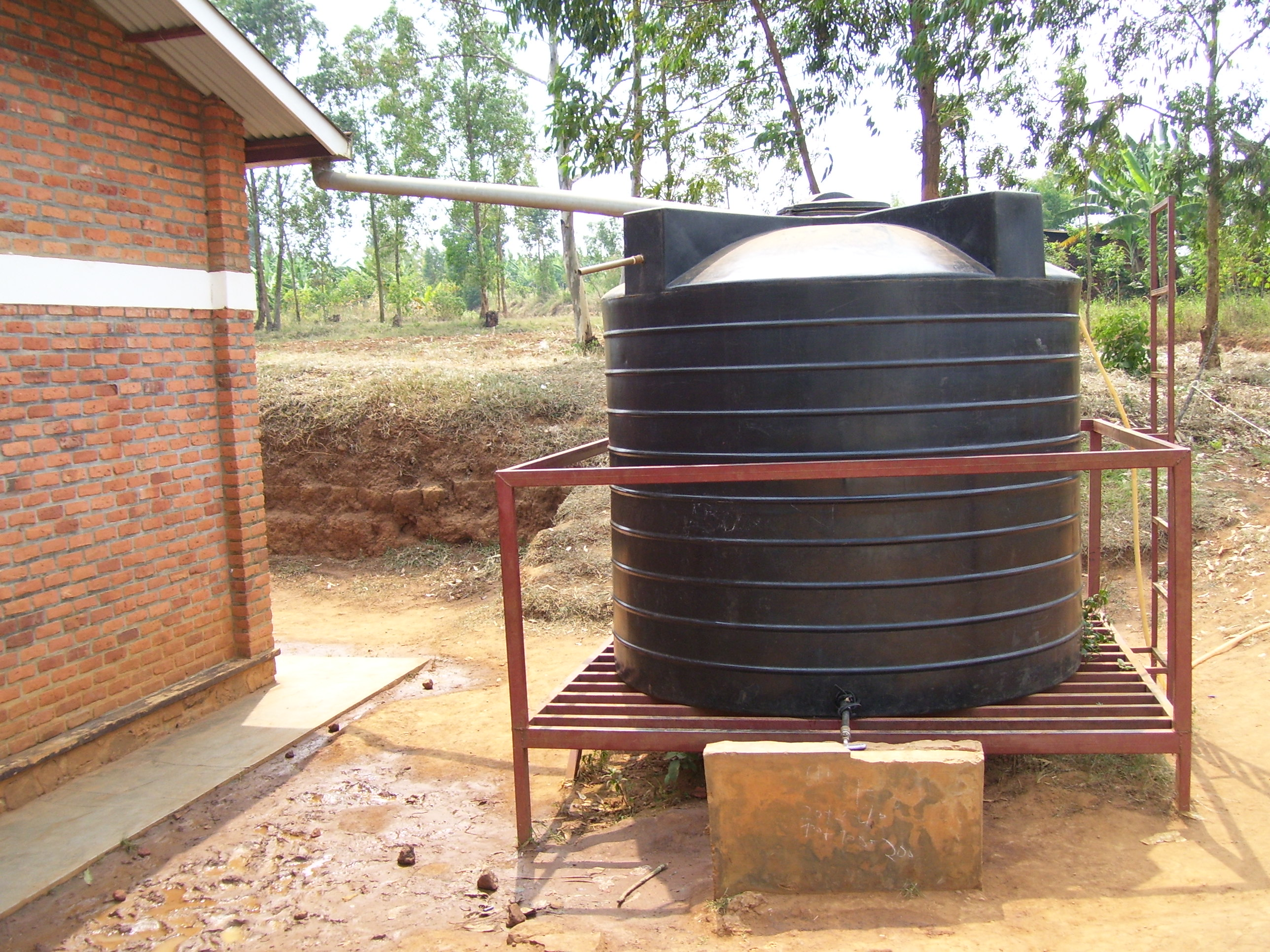
Rainwater harvesting tank from rooftop at a school near Kigali, Rwanda

Rainwater harvesting is one of the simplest and oldest methods of self-supply. This can be as simple as putting a bucket at the edge of a tin roof. It can also involve the construction of small reservoirs and gutters along the edge of a roof to collect a larger quantity of water.

Rain water harvesting has been extensively promoted in Thailand and is an example of how self-supply initiatives can reach large scale (even though in a first phase, the initiative was more of a direct implementation by the Thai government), in this case several million rural households.

=== Household water treatment ===
Household water treatment a means to improve quality of water before consumption. It can be implemented under a self-supply approach, but also under other approaches. The most ubiquitous method of household water treatment in the world is boiling. Other methods that have been advocated are point-of-use chlorination, SODIS, and various types of water filters.

Clean water technology can be found in the form of drinking straw filtration. Used as solution by Water Is Life, the straw is small, portable, and costs US$10 per unit. The filtration device is designed to eliminate waterborne diseases, and as a result, provide safe drinking water for one person for one year.

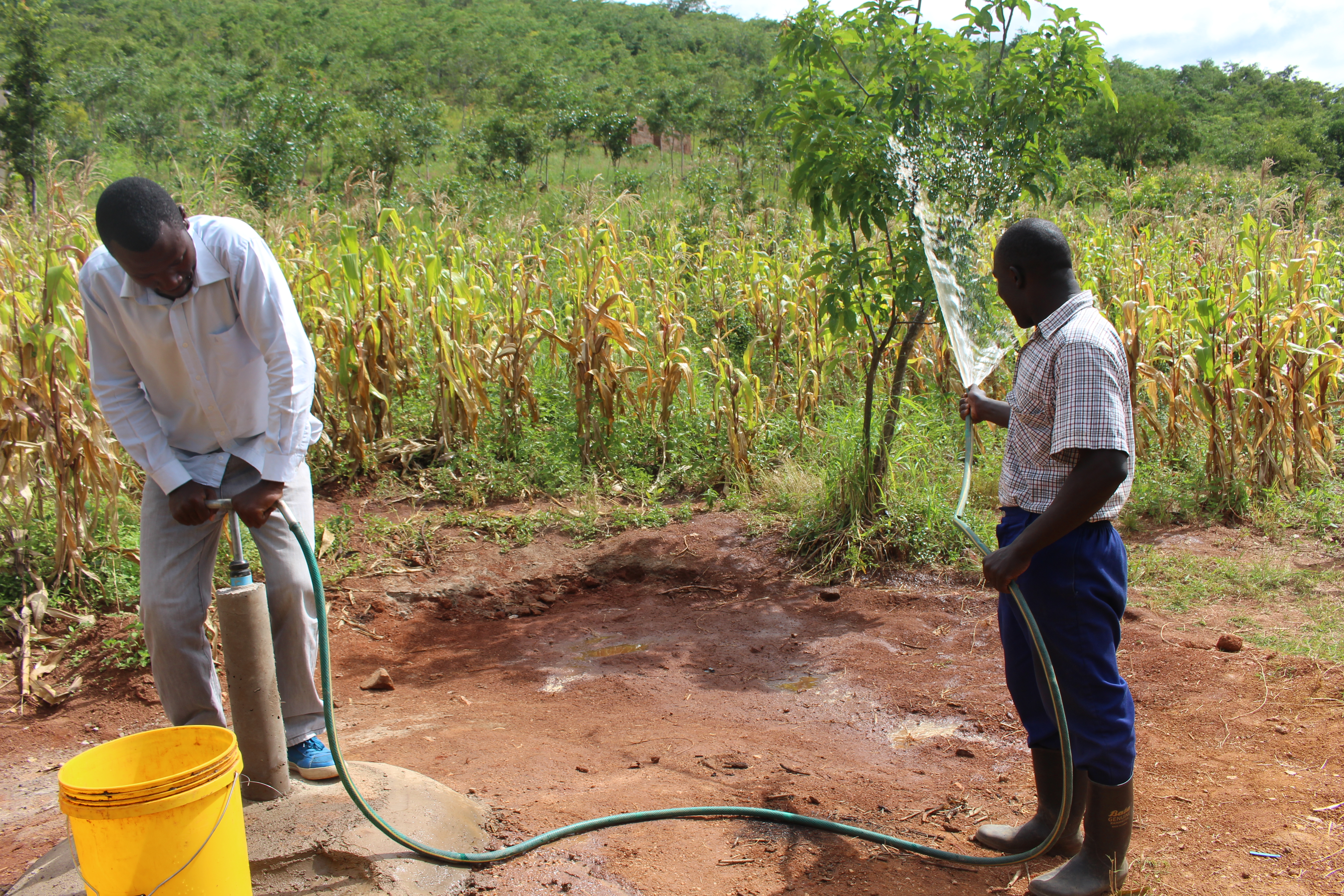
Emas pump

=== EMAS technologies in Bolivia ===
EMAS (Mobile Water & Sanitation School - Spanish acronym, Escuela Móvil de Agua y Saneamiento) has been promoting different technologies to improve water supply and sanitation in Bolivia since the 1980s. Technologies promoted by EMAS in Bolivia are hand-pumps for household water supply, rainwater harvesting, safe household water storage tanks made of ferrocement, pit latrines, and a hybrid percussion-jetting-rotation manual drilling method. In 2013 an independent assessment was conducted that examined all of the technologies promoted by EMAS in Bolivia. The study found that a majority of the households surveyed (53 of 86) purchased EMAS technology with no subsidies or loans. Also, a majority of the households surveyed had operational EMAS pumps (78 out of 79) with all of the pumps being installed 11 years or more previously (18 out of 79) still being operational

== Approaches for sanitation ==
In the field of sanitation, the term "self supply" is not commonly used. However, a similar concept is that of community-led total sanitation. This is a behavior change approach which results in people abandoning open defecation and typically building and using pit latrines instead.

Another approach which could be used for self supply in sanitation is that of container-based sanitation even though the collection and treatment steps are usually carried out by an external service provider, not by the households themselves.

== Challenges ==
=== Health risks ===
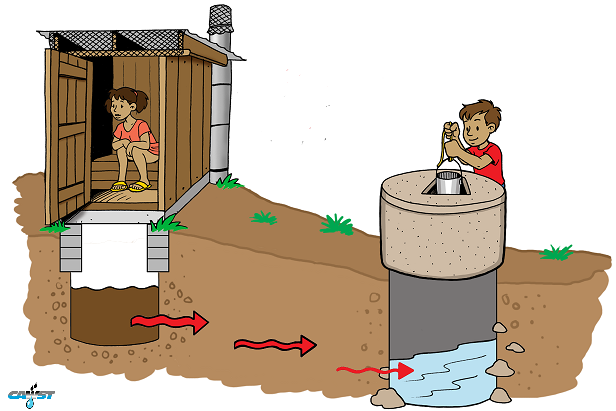
Waterborne diseases can be spread via a groundwater well which is contaminated with fecal pathogens from pit latrines

Because of limited capacities of governments in many countries for private supplies to be regularly tested, often combined with unclear responsibilities for water quality of private supplies, the health risks of these supplies tend to be higher than of larger networks. As a consequence, households who provide their own water supply and sanitation might end up with polluted drinking water. One example is the problem with arsenic polluted groundwater in Bangladesh.

=== Poverty ===
In contrary to a direct intervention approach, where either a government agency or a private actor (usually a non-profit organization) directly provides a defined target group with a specific service level, self-supply relies on establishing mechanisms to let people decide themselves on the level, the location and the timing of the service provided. This needs special attention to market development, to strengthening the capacities of the private sector (as a service provider) and government agencies (e.g., as quality monitoring agency). Thus, while not interacting directly with any households, self-supply does not imply that the poorest households and individuals are abandoned, but it optimizes the limited resources available at all levels. In cases where the government can not fulfil this role of a regulator and monitoring agencies, dynamic processes have led to overexploitation of groundwater resources (e.g., in the city of Lagos) and of increased public health problems due to the consumption of groundwater that is naturally contaminated with arsenic.

However, there are also examples where self-supply contributed to better access to water and sanitation services even by the poorest. For example, Thailand, where millions of rural people upgraded their water service level by buying additional vessels for storing rainwater, is one of the countries with most equal rates of access to drinking water. Additionally, in many cases the owners of a private well or other water source are not the only people who benefit from it. Neighbors, who may be poorer than the owners, also benefit from the water source since frequently they are allowed to use it as well.

=== Role of government ===
Advocating for self-supply improvements means supporting the target population in a different way than many WASH programs do. Instead of focusing on government providing specific services directly it implies strengthening capacities of the private sector and aims to improve their quality of service. Apart from capacity building, the role of government may also include quality assurance, monitoring, and regulation.

=== Human right to water and sanitation ===
The criticism is based on the assumption that the Human Right to Water and Sanitation imply that the government directly has to deliver water and sanitation services to everyone. However, as the United Nations' Special Rapporteur on the Human Rights to Water and Sanitation pointed out, the government can also opt for a strategy of strengthening capacities of the private sector under a supported self-supply approach, allowing its resources to be used efficiently and reaching people in sparsely populated rural areas.

== History ==
The term "self-supply" was coined by members of the Rural Water Supply Network (RWSN) during the RWSN Forum in Uganda in 2004. It subsequently became one of the key topics of this network, which continues to update information regarding self-supply under their thematic website. Around 2010 it became apparent that there is a need to distinguish between "self-supply" and "accelerated self-supply", which often also is mentioned as "supported self-supply".

Whereas in many non-industrialized countries self-supply is a naturally occurring process largely without government supervision, there are also exceptions to this rule. For example, self-supply has been formally endorsed by the national government of Ethiopia as a service delivery model for water in rural areas. Furthermore, the experience of Thailand (see example on Rainwater Harvesting) shows how a country can start with a government-driven approach and substantial use of subsidies to a self-supply approach once the private sector is strong enough, and that the resources and emphasis of the government agencies then can shift to monitoring water quality.

== See also ==
- Hygiene
- List of water supply and sanitation by country
- Off-the-grid
- Safe household water storage
