= Hygiene program =

Hygiene services for people experiencing homelessness

Hygiene programs provide basic hygiene facilities to people experiencing homelessness. Some are stand-alone hygiene centers while others are at locations that also provide additional kinds of services. They are a response to addressing homelessness, alongside things like basic homeless shelters that just provide a bed and toilet for the night, or soup kitchens which often do not have places for patrons to wash their hands.

They may have a toilet, wash basin, and a shower, and many have other amenities, such as a mirror to assist with shaving and applying cosmetics, a diaper-changing station, electric outlets for appliances such as irons, private dressing stalls, laundry facilities, or hygiene supplies such as soap, toothpaste, tampons, pads, or condoms.

Such facilities also offer people experiencing homelessness an alternative to using restrooms in libraries and other public buildings.

== Mobile shower programs ==
There are also dozens of mobile hygiene programs that provide services by using shower trailers that can be driven or towed to various locations.
