= Safe household water storage =

Safe household water storage is a critical component of a Household Water Treatment and Safe Storage (HWTS) system being promoted by the World Health Organization (WHO) worldwide in areas that do not have piped drinking water. In these areas, it is not uncommon for drinking water to be stored in a pot, jar, crock or other container in the home. Even if this drinking water was of acceptable microbiological quality initially, it can become contaminated by dirty hands and utensils, such as dirty diapers and cups. Drinking water containers with "narrow dispensers are key" to keeping water from being contaminated while being stored in the home.

All types of 'safe household water storage must be used with water from known clean sources or with water having received prior efficacious treatment.

== Examples of containers ==
- Solar Cookers International (SCI) has incorporated the Safe Household Water Storage container in their water pasteurization programs in Kenya. They are part of a safe water package that consists of a CooKit solar cooker, a black pot, a Water Pasteurization Indicator (WAPI), and a Safe Household Water Storage container. The containers are handmade out of clay by local artisans. Their design incorporates a small opening at the top to help prevent children from dipping cups and possibly dirty hands into the drinking water. There is a spigot at the bottom. "Unfortunately, the spigot is almost as expensive as the container itself." In total each costs about KSh.450/= or about US$6.00. The unglazed clay container helps to keep the water naturally somewhat cool in dry climates because a very small amount of the water is absorbed by the container and then evaporates.

== Background ==
The United Nations' Millennium Declaration adopted by its General Assembly in September 2000 set Millennium Development Goals (MDG) that have a purpose of significantly reducing the proportion of people in the world in extreme poverty. Resolution 19 specifically states with respect to drinking water, "To halve, by the year 2015...the proportion of the world's people who are unable to reach or to afford safe drinking water". In 2009 the United Nations published The Millennium Development Goals Report that states: "The world is well on its way to meeting the drinking water target, though some countries still face enormous challenges." One way that the World Health Organization (WHO) has supported the safe drinking water goal is with its Household Water Treatment and Safe Storage (HWTS) program which targets people who are not connected to community water systems. Their website states that improved HWTS techniques can dramatically improve drinking water quality and reduce diarrhoeal diseases for those who must rely on unsafe water supplies. It reminds us that there are 1.6 million diarrhoeal deaths per year related to unsafe water, sanitation, and hygiene and that these are mostly of children under 5 years old.

== See also ==
- Point-of-use water treatment which discusses a variety of water treatment methods which may be used by households to improve water quality.
- Self-supply of water and sanitation
- UN-Water is a mechanism of the United Nations with the purpose of supporting water-related efforts.
