= Ali Gholi Agha hammam =

Historic bathhouse in Isfahan, Iran

Ali Gholi Agha Hammam
- حمام علیقلی‌آقا

- Location within Iran

General information
- Status: Cultural
- Type: hammam
- Architectural style: Isfahani
- Location: Isfahan, Iran
- Coordinates: 32.6682°N 51.6674°E

Iran National Heritage List
- Official name: Ali Gholi Agha Hammam
- Type: Hammam
- Designated: 1935
- Reference no.: 226
- Conservation organization: Cultural Heritage, Handicrafts and Tourism Organization of Iran

The Ali Gholi Agha hammam is a historic hammam in the Bidabad district of Isfahan, Iran. The hammam was built in 1713 by Ali Gholi Agha, who was a courtier of the Safavid shahs Suleiman I and Soltan Hoseyn. Its architectural style is Isfahani and it was built in the late Safavid era.

The structure consists of one large hammam and a small hammam and also a Howz. Each of these hammams consists of a dressing room and a Garmkhaneh (hothouse), so that they could be used in that time separately by men and women. At present, the structure is a museum and can be visited by travellers.

== See also ==
- List of historical structures in Isfahan province
