= Wolk =

Wolk is a surname, and may refer to:

- Andy Wolk, American television and theatre director
- Arthur Alan Wolk (born 1943), American attorney and author
- Donna Wolk, American microbiologist
- Douglas Wolk (born 1970), American author and critic
- Emil Wolk (born 1944), Anglo-American stage director and stage and screen actor
- Ivy Wolk (born 2004), American actress and comedian
- James Wolk (born 1985), American actor
- Lois Wolk (born 1946), American politician
- Steven Wolk, chief technology officer
- Tom "T-Bone" Wolk, a bass guitarist
- William Wolk (1951–2022), an American painter

== See also ==
- Wolke (disambiguation)
- Wölk
