= Waterborne disease =

Disease caused by agents transmitted by water

Waterborne diseases
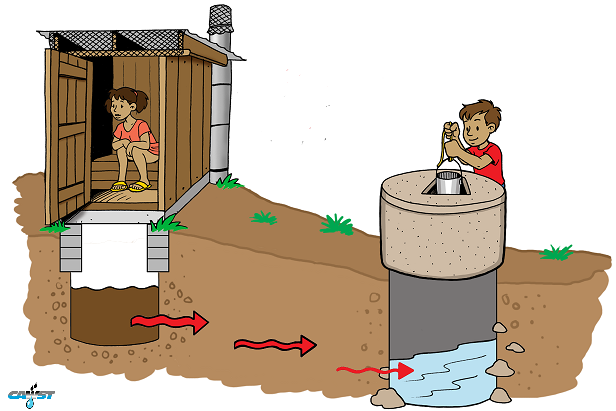
- Waterborne diseases can be spread via groundwater which is contaminated with fecal pathogens from pit latrines.
- Specialty: Infectious disease

Waterborne diseases are diseases caused by pathogenic micro-organisms, such as bacteria, viruses, protozoa, and parasitic worms, that are transmitted through contaminated water. Many of these micro-organisms are intestinal parasites, invading the tissues or circulatory system through walls of the digestive tract. Various other waterborne diseases are caused by viruses. Other important classes of waterborne diseases are caused by metazoan parasites. Typical examples are certain Nematoda, or "roundworms", which may result in diseases such as Dracunculiasis. Another class of waterborne metazoan pathogens is Schistosomatidae, a family of blood flukes. In addition to pathogens, water contamination may also be driven by chemical pollutants such as volatile organic compounds (VOCs). These include benzene, toluene, ethylbenzene, and xylenes, which can enter water lines through industrial dumping, pipeline leaks, jet fuel spills, or heat-damaged plastic pipes.

These diseases can spread through bathing, washing, drinking contaminated water, or eating food that has been exposed to contaminated water. While diarrhea and vomiting are the most commonly reported symptoms of waterborne illnesses, other symptoms may include nausea, stomach cramps, fever, and skin, ear, respiratory, or eye problems. Exposure to water contaminated with VOCs has been associated with headaches, nausea, tumor formation, and an increased risk of cancer, including leukemia. Waterborne diseases contribute significantly to mortality and disability worldwide, particularly in developing regions.

The most effective mechanism for preventing waterborne disease is reliable access to clean water, sanitation, and hygiene (WASH). This includes improving sanitation systems, chlorination, vaccination, and desalination. Infrastructure improvements, such as replacing damaged plastic pipes with metal ones in wildfire-prone areas, may also reduce the risk of contamination. Climate change increases the risk of waterborne diseases via the increased likelihood of droughts and floods, which can spread contaminants and disproportionately affect vulnerable populations. Surveillance can help monitor and prevent outbreaks. Historically, advances in sanitation, filtration, chlorination, and microbiology have helped scientists understand and control of waterborne diseases.

== Terminology ==
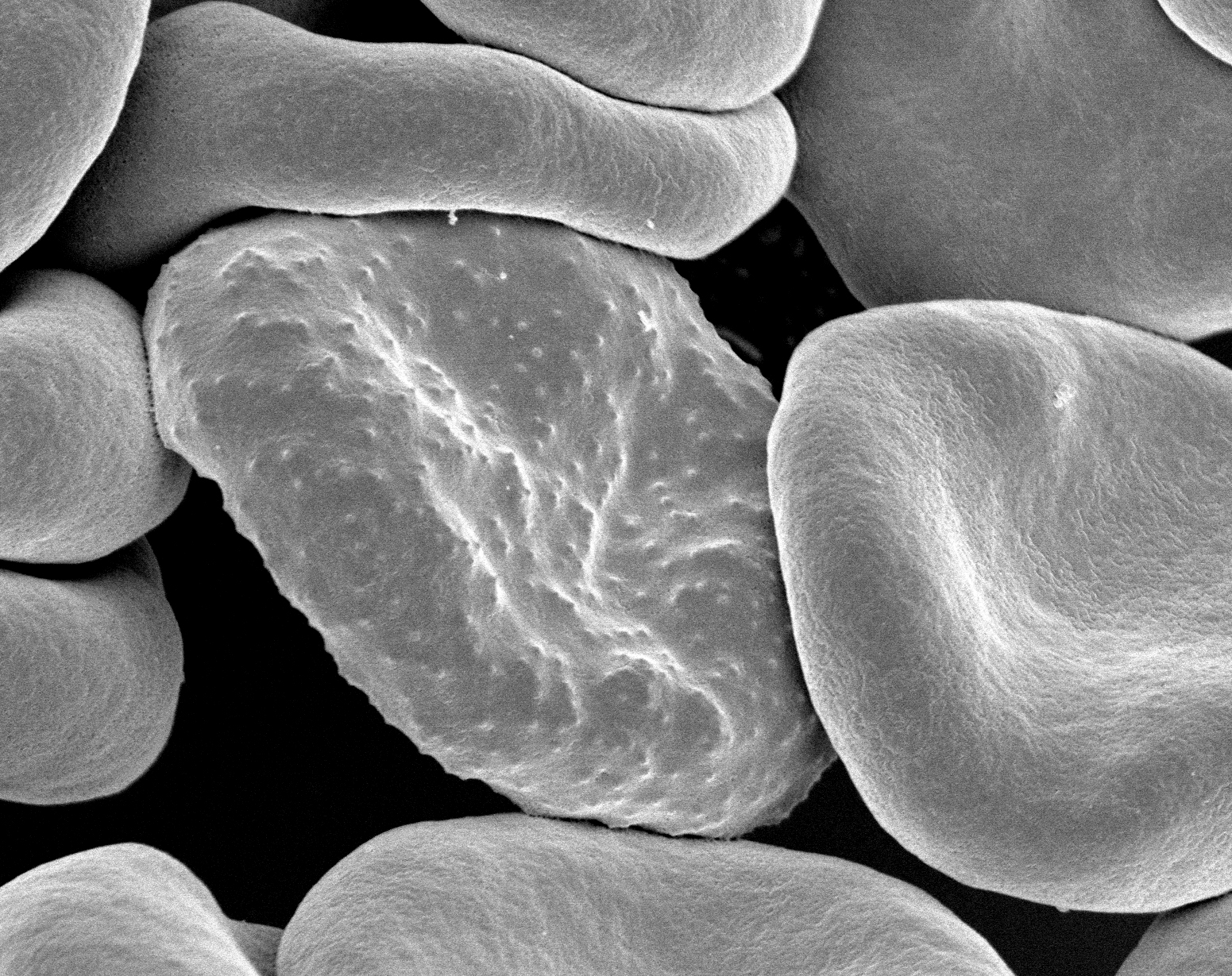
Red blood cells of an organism which has contracted malaria

The term "waterborne disease" is reserved largely for infections that are predominantly transmitted through contact with or consumption of microbially polluted water. Many infections may be transmitted by microbes or parasites that have entered the water accidentally, perhaps due to exceptional circumstances. However it may not be useful to categorize a disease as "waterborne" just because it may occasionally be transmitted by water. Diseases such as malaria are commonly mistaken as "waterborne" because mosquitos, acting as vectors, have aquatic stages in their life cycle. Controlling or treating still water can reduce mosquito populations, suggesting the idea that the disease is transmitted through water and not mosquito bites.

A related term is "water-related disease" which is defined as "any significant or widespread adverse effects on human health, such as death, disability, illness or disorders, caused directly or indirectly by the condition, or changes in the quantity or quality of any water". Water-related diseases are grouped according to their transmission mechanism: water borne, water hygiene, water based, water related. The main transmission mode for waterborne diseases is ingestion of contaminated water.

== Causes ==
Lack of clean water supply, sanitation and hygiene (WASH) are major causes of the spread of waterborne diseases. The fecal–oral route is a transmission pathway for waterborne diseases. Poverty also increases the risk of communities being affected by waterborne diseases. For example, the economic level of a community may affect its access to clean water. Less developed countries might be more at risk of waterborne disease outbreaks than more developed regions. Additionally, 1 in 4 people, or 2.1 billion people globally, currently do not have access to safe drinking water.

=== Socioeconomic factors ===
The lack of education in impoverished regions often results in waterborne disease. If local people are aware of an issue, they can take action to solve the problem domestically rather than relying on foreign counties for aid. Many countries in the Middle East, South East Asia, and Sub-Saharan Africa are prone to these issues because they lack advanced education. For example, Morocco has insufficient labor supply for the production of food and other work forces that could be well maximized. In response, the United States, Morocco and many other agencies worked together to initiate the H2O Maghreb Partnership. This educates the people of Morocco on clean water and sanitization through simulations of water treatment. Not only do the virtual reality technologies but recreate rare emergency circumstances for practice and also provide jobs for the citizens in under-developed countries to help the economy.

Political turmoil and war stimulate the transmission of waterborne disease in addition to lack of education. Countries in the Eastern Mediterranean Region deal with this issue especially. The World Bank has classified Yemen, along with several other countries in the Eastern Mediterranean Region, as "fragile and conflict-affected countries". Syria and Lebanon had not seen any outbreaks of cholera in about three decades, but it reappeared in 2022. War destroys the infrastructure needed for clean water and sanitization structures: a recipe for disease to spread. Two years ago the World Health Organization changed the status of cholera to a Grade 3 global public health emergency. Between the years 2016 and 2022 Yemen saw 2.5 million cases of cholera. These outbreaks are closely tied to the conflicts in the region. War also destroys the necessary medical facilities and hospitals to take care of patients who have contracted the waterborne diseases. In the Eastern Mediterranean Region, countries are no longer grappling with a pandemic, but rather an endemic.

Other war-torn regions such as Gaza must manage complex water systems which present more danger to the quality of water and chance of waterborne disease being present. Gaza gets the majority of its water from underground, but also some from Israel; they also have several desalination plants across the region. Workers are constantly working to fix water pipeline systems that have been destroyed by artillery in the war but are sometimes killed in the process.

As a comparison of a safe country's and a war-torn country's water consumption, Americans use about 300 liters per day while in Gaza a person would use about 80 liters per day. With every part of the water system in Gaza suffering harm in some shape or form by 2024, waterborne disease cases shortly thereafter exploded with 600,000 cases of acute diarrhea and even a 10 month old with polio.

Nature Communications published a 2022 study which measured the associations between racial and ethnic communities and concentrations of contaminants in drinking water from 2000 to 2011 in the United States. Counties with a greater proportion of Hispanic and Native American residents contained higher concentrations of arsenic and uranium in drinking water. However, non-Hispanic White residents had lower concentrations. The authors concluded that disparities in drinking water quality vary by region and demographic composition, representing the inequalities in exposure to regulated drinking water in the United States.

==== Africa ====
The waterborne disease burden in Africa is severe and, in several ways, not comparable with anywhere else in the world. Decades of underinvestment in water infrastructure, rapid population growth and the persistent gap between urban and rural service delivery have left millions of people without reliable access to safe water. As of 2022, just 31% of sub-Saharan Africa's population used safely managed drinking water, less than half the global average of 73%; and only 24% had access to safely managed sanitation. By 2020, 418 million people on the continent still lack basic drinking water service, while 779 million had no basic sanitation, among them 208 million who continued to practice open defecation.

The consequences show up most gravely in child mortality. Diarrheal disease kills an estimated 600,000 people a year in sub-Saharan Africa, most of them being children under five and elderly adults, making it the third-leading cause of death in that age group across the region. What makes this particularly troubling is that the figure is almost certainly an undercount. Around 56% of African countries have no systematic waterborne pathogen surveillance in place, so outbreaks go unrecorded and deaths unattributed. Africa is believed to lead the world in diarrheal disease mortality, yet the data needed to fully confirm or address that reality largely is insufficient.

=== Influence of climate change ===
Climate change influences the growth and survival of bacteria and other pathogens in food and water systems. It affects waterborne diseases by influencing water temperature, water quality, sanitation, and microbial ecology.

Climate change plays a major role in the socioeconomic impact of waterborne disease, especially in informal settlements. Over 60% of Africa's urban population lives in areas with limited water and sanitation infrastructure. Droughts have been linked to cholera outbreaks in Nairobi, while flooding can spread pathogens through contaminated water.

Warmer waters, increased flooding, precipitation and humidity promote the growth and spread of bacteria such as Vibrio cholerae, which causes cholera, and other pathogens responsible for gastroenteritis, wound infections and diarrheal diseases. Higher water temperatures can also increase the yield of bacteria from drinking water delivery systems and during periods of warmer temperatures water consumption rates are also typically higher. Together these increase the probability of pathogen ingestion and infection.

Heavy rainfall and flooding caused by climate change can also affect pathogen transmission via impacts on sanitation and/or drinking water treatment infrastructure, contaminating drinking water sources or food products. Floods can overwhelm water systems, causing backflow that lead to contamination of groundwater and other drinking water sources.

== Diseases by type of pathogen ==
=== Protozoa ===
Disease and transmission	Microbial agent	Sources of agent in water supply	General symptoms
Acanthamoeba keratitis (cleaning of contact lenses with contaminated water)	Acanthamoeba spp. (A. castellanii and A. polyphaga)	widely distributed free-living amoebae found in many types of aquatic environments, including surface water, tap water, swimming pools, and contact lens solutions	Eye pain, eye redness, blurred vision, sensitivity to light, sensation of something in the eye, and excessive tearing
Amoebiasis (hand-to-mouth)	Protozoan (Entamoeba histolytica) (Cyst-like appearance)	Sewage, non-treated drinking water, flies in water supply, saliva transfer(if the other person has the disease)	Abdominal discomfort, fatigue, weight loss, diarrhea, bloating, fever
Cryptosporidiosis (oral)	Protozoan (Cryptosporidium parvum)	Collects on water filters and membranes that cannot be disinfected, animal manure, seasonal runoff of water.	Flu-like symptoms, watery diarrhea, loss of appetite, substantial loss of weight, bloating, increased gas, nausea
Cyclosporiasis	Protozoan parasite (Cyclospora cayetanensis)	Sewage, non-treated drinking water	cramps, nausea, vomiting, muscle aches, fever, and fatigue
Giardiasis (fecal-oral) (hand-to-mouth)	Protozoan (Giardia lamblia) Most common intestinal parasite	Untreated water, poor disinfection, pipe breaks, leaks, groundwater contamination, campgrounds where humans and wildlife use same source of water. Beavers and muskrats create ponds that act as reservoirs for Giardia.	Diarrhea, abdominal discomfort, bloating, and flatulence
Microsporidiosis	Protozoan phylum (Microsporidia), but closely related to fungi	Encephalitozoon intestinalis has been detected in groundwater, the origin of drinking water	Diarrhea and wasting in immunocompromised individuals.
Naegleriasis (primary amebic meningoencephalitis [PAM]) (nasal)	Protozoan (Naegleria fowleri) (Cyst-like appearance)	Watersports, non-chlorinated water	Headache, vomiting, confusion, loss of balance, light sensitivity, hallucinations, fatigue, weight loss, fever, and coma

=== Bacteria ===
Disease and transmission	Microbial agent	Sources of agent in water supply	General symptoms
Botulism	Clostridium botulinum	Bacteria can enter an open wound from contaminated water sources. Can enter the gastrointestinal tract through consumption of contaminated drinking water or (more commonly) food	Dry mouth, blurred and/or double vision, difficulty swallowing, muscle weakness, difficulty breathing, slurred speech, vomiting and sometimes diarrhea. Death is usually caused by respiratory failure.
Campylobacteriosis	Most commonly caused by Campylobacter jejuni	Drinking water contaminated with feces	Produces dysentery-like symptoms along with a high fever. Usually lasts 2–10 days.
Cholera	Spread by the bacterium Vibrio cholerae	Drinking water contaminated with the bacterium	In severe forms it is known to be one of the most rapidly fatal illnesses known. Symptoms include very watery diarrhea, nausea, cramps, nosebleed, rapid pulse, vomiting, and hypovolemic shock (in severe cases), at which point death can occur in 12–18 hours.
E. coli Infection	Certain strains of Escherichia coli (commonly E. coli)	Water contaminated with the bacteria	Mostly diarrhea. Can cause death in immunocompromised individuals, the very young, and the elderly due to dehydration from prolonged illness.
M. marinum infection	Mycobacterium marinum	Naturally occurs in water, most cases from exposure in swimming pools or more frequently aquariums; rare infection since it mostly infects immunocompromised individuals	Symptoms include lesions typically located on the elbows, knees, and feet (from swimming pools) or lesions on the hands (aquariums). Lesions may be painless or painful.
Dysentery	Caused by a number of species in the genera Shigella and Salmonella with the most common being Shigella dysenteriae	Water contaminated with the bacterium	Frequent passage of feces with blood and/or mucus and in some cases vomiting of blood.
Legionellosis (two distinct forms: Legionnaires' disease and Pontiac fever)	Caused by bacteria belonging to genus Legionella (90% of cases caused by Legionella pneumophila)	Legionella is a very common organism that reproduces to high numbers in warm water; but only causes severe disease when aerosolized.	Pontiac fever produces milder symptoms resembling acute influenza without pneumonia. Legionnaires' disease has severe symptoms such as fever, chills, pneumonia (with cough that sometimes produces sputum), ataxia, anorexia, muscle aches, malaise and occasionally diarrhea and vomiting
Leptospirosis	Caused by bacterium of genus Leptospira	Water contaminated by the animal urine carrying the bacteria	Begins with flu-like symptoms then resolves. The second phase then occurs involving meningitis, liver damage (causes jaundice), and kidney failure
Otitis Externa (swimmer's ear)	Caused by a number of bacterial and fungal species.	Swimming in water contaminated by the responsible pathogens	Ear canal swells, causing pain and tenderness to the touch
Salmonellosis	Caused by many bacteria of genus Salmonella	Drinking water contaminated with the bacteria. More common as a food borne illness.	Symptoms include diarrhea, fever, vomiting, and abdominal cramps
Typhoid fever	Salmonella typhi	Ingestion of water contaminated with feces of an infected person	Characterized by sustained fever up to 40 °C (104 °F), profuse sweating; diarrhea, muscle aches, fatigue, and constipation may occur. Symptoms progress to delirium, and the spleen and liver enlarge if untreated. In this case, it can last up to four weeks and cause death. Some people with typhoid fever develop a rash called "rose spots", small red spots on the abdomen and chest.
Vibrio Illness	Vibrio vulnificus, Vibrio alginolyticus, and Vibrio parahaemolyticus	Can enter wounds from contaminated water. Also acquired by drinking contaminated water or eating undercooked oysters.	Symptoms include abdominal tenderness, agitation, bloody stools, chills, confusion, difficulty paying attention (attention deficit), delirium, fluctuating mood, hallucination, nosebleeds, severe fatigue, slow, sluggish, lethargic feeling, weakness.

=== Viruses ===
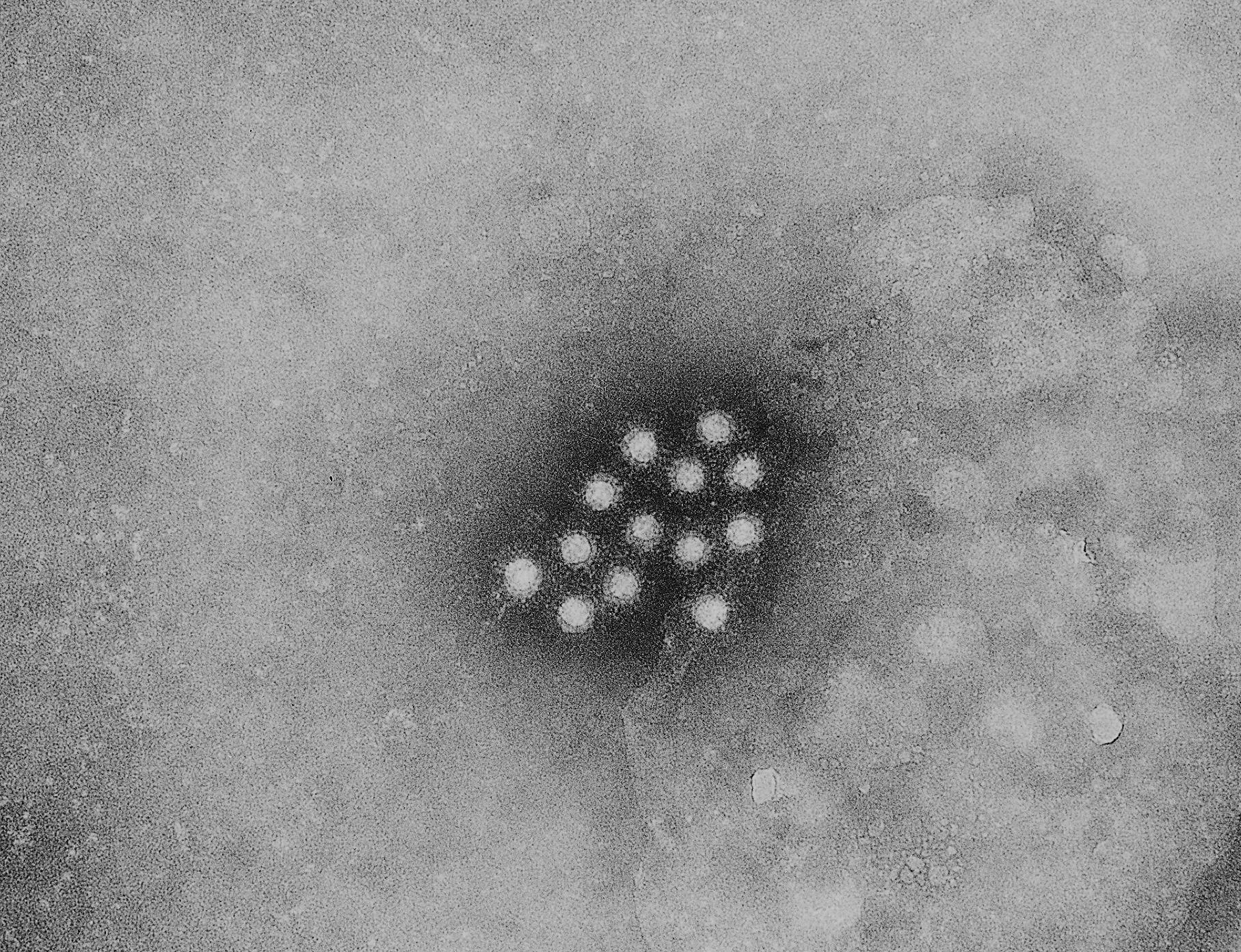
Hepatitis A virusHepatitis A is one of waterborne diseases and its symptoms are only acute. Symptoms include fatigue, fever, etc.

Disease and transmission	Viral agent	Sources of agent in water supply	General symptoms
Hepatitis A	Hepatitis A virus (HAV)	Can manifest itself in water (and food)	Symptoms are only acute (no chronic stage to the virus) and include Fatigue, fever, malaise, abdominal pain, nausea, diarrhea, weight loss, itching, jaundice, and depression.
Hepatitis E (fecal-oral)	Hepatitis E virus (HEV)	Enters water through the feces of infected individuals	Symptoms of acute hepatitis (liver disease), including fever, fatigue, loss of appetite, nausea, vomiting, abdominal pain, jaundice, dark urine, clay-colored stool, and joint pain
Acute gastrointestinal illness [AGI] (fecal-oral; spread by food, water, person-to-person, and fomites)	Norovirus	Enters water through the feces of infected individuals	Diarrhea, vomiting, nausea, stomach pain
Poliomyelitis (Polio)	Poliovirus	Enters water through the feces of infected individuals	90–95% of patients show no symptoms, 4–8% have minor symptoms (comparatively) with delirium, headache, fever, and occasional seizures, and spastic paralysis, 1% have symptoms of non-paralytic aseptic meningitis. The rest have serious symptoms resulting in paralysis or death
Polyomavirus infection	Two of Polyomavirus: JC virus and BK virus	Very widespread, can manifest itself in water, ~80% of the population has antibodies to Polyomavirus	BK virus produces a mild respiratory infection and can infect the kidneys of immunosuppressed transplant patients. JC virus infects the respiratory system, kidneys or can cause progressive multifocal leukoencephalopathy in the brain (which is fatal).

=== Algae ===
Disease and transmission	Microbial agent	Sources of agent in water supply	General symptoms
Desmodesmus infection	desmodesmus armatus	Naturally occurs in water. Can enter open wounds.	Similar to fungal infection.

=== Parasitic worms ===
Disease and transmission	Agent	Sources of agent in water supply	General symptoms
Dracunculiasis [Guinea worm disease] (ingestion of contaminated water.)	Dracunculus medinensis	Female worm emerges from host skin and releases larvae in water.	Slight fever, itchy rash, nausea, vomiting, diarrhea, dizziness, followed by formation of painful blister (typically on lower body parts)
Schistosomiasis [an infection with the parasitic worm Schistosoma](ingestion or swimming in contaminated water.)	Schistosoma	The worm enters the body through the skin and spreads throughout the body through the bloodstream.	Rash, itching, flu-like symptoms, stomach pain, muscle aches, loss of appetite, vomiting blood, and neurological symptoms.

=== Volatile Organic Compounds (VOC) ===
Disease and transmission	Compounds	Sources of agent in water supply	General symptoms
Leukemia	Any volatile compounds such as trichloroethylene and aromatic compounds such as benzene, toluene, ethylbenzene, and xylenes.	Water used as dumping grounds of VOCs, causing contamination; pipeline bursts; jet fuel leakage.	Headache, fever, nausea, formation of tumors.

== Prevention ==
Reliable access to clean, uncontaminated drinking water and proper sanitation are the main methods to prevent waterborne diseases. Vaccination is another method to prevent the body from getting water-born diseases The aim is to break the fecal–oral route of disease transmission.

Solar energy has been become a clean and efficient means by which water can now be distilled and desalinated. This method is environmentally safe because it does not produce mass amounts of carbon dioxide that could damage the planet. In fact, the carbon dioxide emissions are virtually zero from using solar energy to distill or desalinate water.

Desalination is the process by which salt is removed from water making it potable. Because water is a scarce resource, meaning that there is a finite amount of it for all of humanity to share, research into sustainability methods for increasing the amount of potable water is important. With an abundance of salt water on Earth, the solar desalination method is innovative and presents potential. It works by using solar panels that capture solar energy from the sun which it then uses to remove the salt from the water through a process called reverse osmosis. The solar energy is converted into electricity via the solar panels. This electricity is then used to push the water at high pressures through filters that block the salt from passing through but do allow the water to pass. This method of desalination is also beneficial to society because it can be used in remote locations. It does not require a connection to a large pipeline system traditionally used that also produce large amounts of carbon dioxide. Specifically, this method is most productive were there is ready access to salt water, an abundance of sunshine, and a lack of fresh drinkable water.

Other policies and precautions can be taken too in order to prevent the spread of disease through contaminated water. For example, appropriate amounts of chlorine can be added to the potable water pipes to remove viruses. Typical household precautions including the use of disinfection wipes and sanitization sprays also are important to use around areas where clean water consumption is very important such as in bathrooms and kitchens. Additionally, it is noted that plastic pipes can release benzene and other VOCs into drinking water when heat-damage occurs from wildfires. The installation of metal piping in high-risk areas may reduce future contamination risks.

== Epidemiology ==
According to the World Health Organization, waterborne diseases account for an estimated 3.6% of the total DALY (disability- adjusted life year) global burden of disease, and cause about 1.5 million human deaths annually. The World Health Organization estimates that 58% of that burden, or 842,000 deaths per year, is attributable to a lack of safe drinking water supply, sanitation and hygiene (summarized as WASH).

=== United States ===
The Waterborne Disease and Outbreak Surveillance System (WBDOSS) is the principal database used to identify the causative agents, deficiencies, water systems, and sources associated with waterborne disease and outbreaks in the United States. Since 1971, the Centers for Disease Control and Prevention (CDC), the Council of State and Territorial Epidemiologists (CSTE), and the US Environmental Protection Agency (EPA) have maintained this surveillance system for collecting and reporting data on "waterborne disease and outbreaks associated with recreational water, drinking water, environmental, and undetermined exposures to water." "Data from WBDOSS have supported EPA efforts to develop drinking water regulations and have provided guidance for CDC's recreational water activities."

WBDOSS relies on complete and accurate data from public health departments in individual states, territories, and other U.S. jurisdictions regarding waterborne disease and outbreak activity. In 2009, reporting to the WBDOSS transitioned from a paper form to the electronic National Outbreak Reporting System (NORS). Annual or biennial surveillance reports of the data collected by the WBDOSS have been published in CDC reports from 1971 to 1984; since 1985, surveillance data have been published in the Morbidity and Mortality Weekly Report (MMWR).

WBDOSS and the public health community work together to look into the causes of contaminated water leading to waterborne disease outbreaks and maintaining those outbreaks. They do so by having the public health community investigating the outbreaks and WBDOSS receiving the reports.

== Society and culture ==
=== Socioeconomic impact ===
Waterborne diseases can have a significant impact on the economy. People who are infected by a waterborne disease are usually confronted with related healthcare costs. This is especially the case in developing countries. On average, a family spends about 10% of the monthly households income per person infected.

Socioeconomic impact refers to the effects that waterborne disease has on society such as the quality of life, medical care, the economy, and education sustainable. Sustainable Development Goal 6, access to clean water and sanitization for all by the year 2030, is at the roots of many of the other sustainable development goals pertaining to society and the economy. Agricultural industries in particular are most severely effected and the increasing stress comes from the booming city populations taking away water from farming. The need for clean water and sanitation is vital because without clean water there is no sustainable food source. Clean water is necessary to produce healthy crops for people to consume. If the water used for crop irrigation is contaminated, the produce could bring a ravaging disease to the people who consume it.

About one third of all of the cities in the world rely on the necessary freshwater that the agriculture industry needs. There is this constant tension on the freshwater supply because as populations in urban areas boom they demand more and more water. This demand for freshwater is estimated to increase 80% in the next 25 years which adds to water stress because farming uses about 72% of the fresh water that the cities need. An example of industries doing their part to help reach Sustainable Development Goal 6 would is the Adopt-a-River Project in Nairobi, Kenya. The United Nations Environment Program worked with several other clubs on the project which consists of traps being established along the Athi River to capture large solid waste. Recycling stations will also be constructed and industries that dump their effluent into water sources will also join the effort. This is a step to remove extra waste from water reducing chances of contamination of water that would eventually be used for irrigation of crops.

== History ==
Waterborne diseases were once wrongly explained by the miasma theory, the theory that bad air causes the spread of diseases. However, people started to find a correlation between water quality and waterborne diseases, which led to different water purification methods, such as sand filtering and chlorinating their drinking water. Founders of microscopy, Antonie van Leeuwenhoek and Robert Hooke, used the newly invented microscope to observe for the first time small material particles that were suspended in the water, laying the groundwork for the future understanding of waterborne pathogens and waterborne diseases.

== See also ==
- Airborne disease
- Foodborne disease
- List of diseases caused by water pollution
- Neglected tropical diseases
- Public health
- Vector-borne diseases
- Water quality
- Zoonosis
