= Microsporidiosis =

Opportunistic intestinal infection

- Specialty: Infectious diseases

Microsporidiosis is an opportunistic intestinal infection that causes diarrhea and wasting in immunocompromised individuals (HIV, for example). It results from different species of microsporidia, a group of microbial (unicellular) fungi.

In HIV-infected individuals, microsporidiosis generally occurs when CD4+ T cell counts fall below 150.

Microsporidia have emerged with significant mortality risk in immunocompromised individuals. These are small, single-celled, obligately intracellular parasites linked to water sources as well as wild, and domestic animals. They were once considered protozoans or protists, but are now known to be fungi, or a sister group to fungi. The most common causes of microsporidiosis is Enterocytozoon bieneusi and Encephalitozoon intestinalis.

== Cause ==
At least 15 microsporidian species have been recognized as human pathogens, spread across nine genera:

- Anncaliia
  - A. algerae, A. connori, A. vesicularum
- Encephalitozoon
  - E. cuniculi, E. hellem, E. intestinalis
- Enterocytozoon
  - E. bieneusi
- Microsporidium
  - M. ceylonensis, M. africanum
- Nosema
  - N. ocularum
- Pleistophora sp.
- Trachipleistophora
  - T. hominis, T. anthropophthera
- Vittaforma
  - V. corneae.
- Tubulinosema
  - T. acridophagus

The primary causes are Enterocytozoon bieneusi and Encephalitozoon intestinalis.

== Life cycle ==
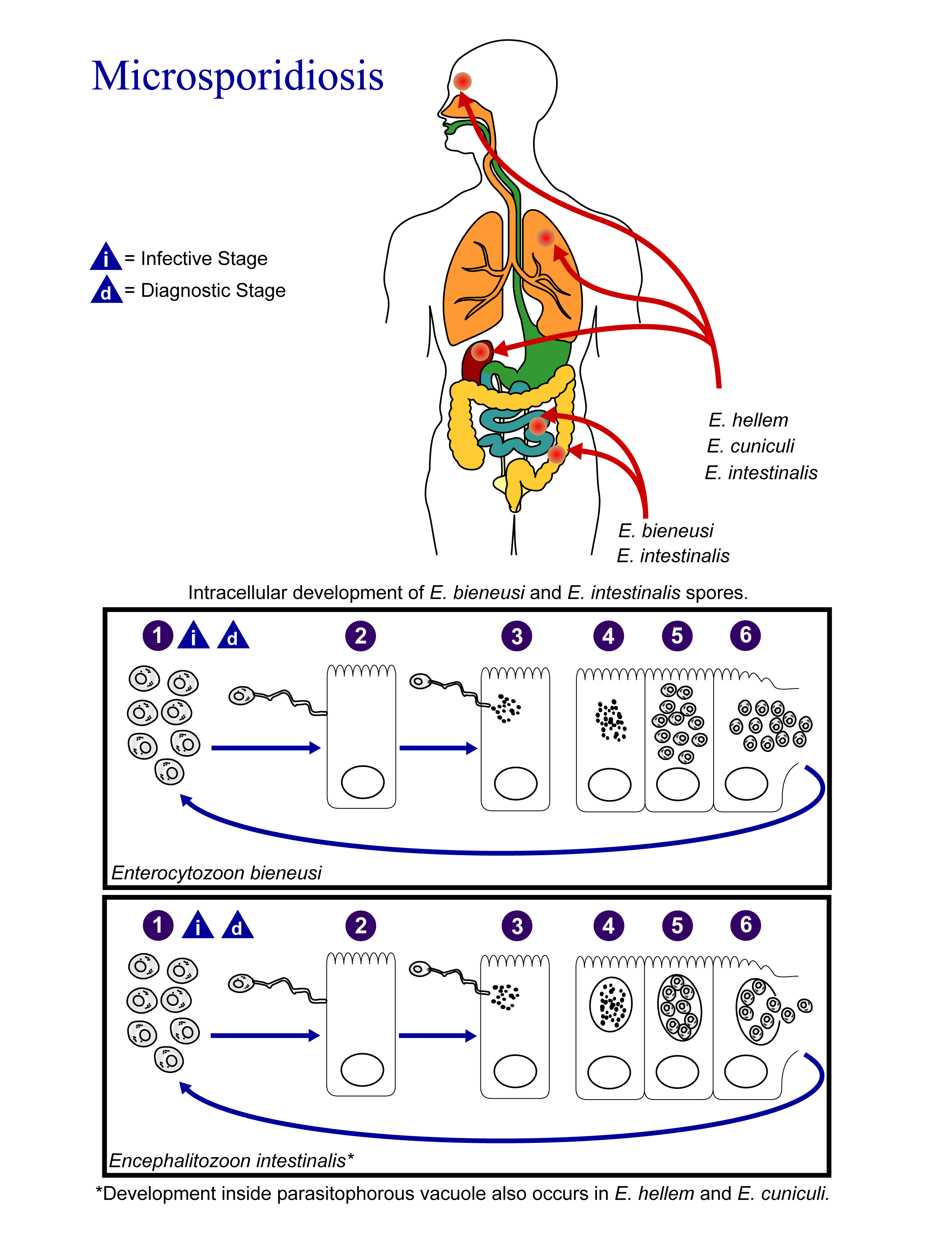
Life cycle of the various organisms that cause microsporidiosis.

(Coded to image at right).

1. The infective form of microsporidia is the resistant spore and it can survive for an extended period of time in the environment.
2. The spore extrudes its polar tubule and infects the host cell.
3. The spore injects the infective sporoplasm into the eukaryotic host cell through the polar tubule.
4. Inside the cell, the sporoplasm undergoes extensive multiplication either by merogony (binary fission) or schizogony (multiple fission).
5. This development can occur either in direct contact with the host cell cytoplasm (E. bieneusi) or inside a vacuole called a parasitophorous vacuole (E. intestinalis). Either free in the cytoplasm or inside a parasitophorous vacuole, microsporidia develop by sporogony to mature spores.
6. During sporogony, a thick wall is formed around the spore, which provides resistance to adverse environmental conditions. When the spores increase in number and completely fill the host cell cytoplasm, the cell membrane is disrupted and releases the spores to the surroundings.
7. These free mature spores can infect new cells thus continuing the cycle.

== Diagnosis ==
The best option for diagnosis is using PCR.

Diagnosis with Microsporidia can be done through gram-positive, acid-fast spores in stool and biopsy material with morphologic demonstration of the organism. Initial detection through light microscopic examination of tissue sections, stools, duodenal aspirates, nasal discharges, bronchoalveolar lavage fluids, and conjunctival smears. Definitive diagnosis can also be achieved through fluorescein-tagged antibody immunofluorescence or electron microscopy, and species identification can be done through PCR.

=== Classification ===
Although it is classified as a protozoal disease in ICD-10, their phylogenetic placement has been resolved to be within the Fungi, and some sources classify microsporidiosis as a mycosis, however, they are highly divergent and rapidly evolving.

== Treatment ==
Fumagillin has been used in the treatment. Another agent used is albendazole.

Because of its severe mortality risk in immunocompromised individuals, two main agents are used: Albendazole, which inhibits tubulin, and Fumagillin, which inhibits methionine aminopeptidase type two.
