= Encephalitozoonosis =

Parasitic disease

Encephalitozoonosis is a parasitic disease caused by the microsporidia Encephalitozoon cuniculi, which mainly affects rabbits in Europe. Other strains of the pathogen cause disease in Old World mice and canines. Encephalitozoonosis occurs mainly in immunocompromised animals and is a potential zoonosis. Although very rare, it can also occur in immunocompromised humans. Wright and Craighead first described the disease in 1922.

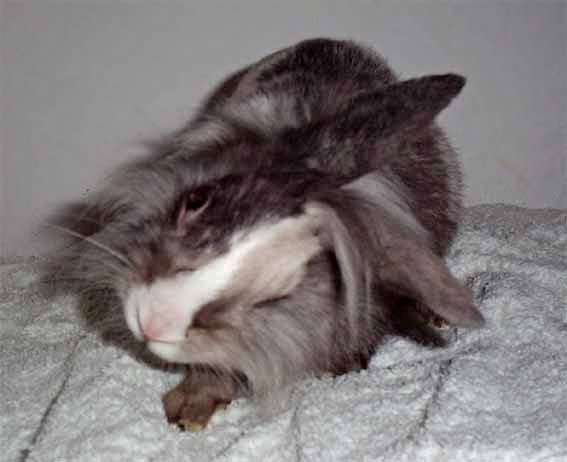
Encephalitozoonosis with torticollis

The pathogen primarily affects the kidneys and brain, causing neurological disorders. The most common symptom is a tilted head. Fenbendazole, an antiparasitic drug, can be used to combat the pathogen and prevent new infections. If clinical symptoms occur, treatment must be extended by administering antibiotics and supportive measures. The prospects of recovery are uncertain.

== Pathogen and occurrence ==
Encephalitozoon cuniculi is a microsporidian protozoan that is an obligate intracellular parasite. It is closely related to fungi, lacking some cell organelles such as mitochondria, and has a small genome of 2.9 million base pairs encoding just under 2000 proteins. The protozoan parasite infects various organs in mammals, including the kidney and brain cells. When outside of its host, the parasite survives as a 2 μm spore, which is the infectious dauer stage.

Three different strains of Encephalitozoon cuniculi are distinguished depending on the main host. Rabbits are susceptible to all three strains, but natural infections have only been described for the rabbit strain. The following strains occur:

- The rabbit strain (type I) is particularly important and occurs worldwide, especially in Europe. Previous studies have found antibodies in 7 to 52% of domestic rabbits. However, this seroprevalence only indicates that the animals have come into contact with the pathogen and are likely still carrying it. The disease only occurs if the immune system is temporarily impaired, such as after viral infections. In neurologically ill domestic rabbits, the seroprevalence can be as high as 85%. The pathogen reservoir is believed to be wild rabbits, which have a seroprevalence rate of between 4% and 25%; other rabbit species do not appear to carry the pathogen. Encephalitozoonosis is currently the most common infectious disease in domestic rabbits.
- Encephalitozoon cuniculi type II (mouse strain) is primarily pathogenic for Old World mice and has only been detected in Europe thus far. The seroprevalence in wild rats and mice ranges between 3 and 4%. Due to high hygiene standards, the pathogen is practically non-existent in laboratory facilities. Fatal infections with this type have also been observed in farm foxes in Scandinavia.
- Encephalitozoon cuniculi type III (canine strain) is mainly found in North America and South Africa. It predominantly affects dogs and is likely the only potentially pathogenic strain for them. Infections have also been observed in prosimians in zoos worldwide.

E. cuniculi is a disease that is found worldwide and was first observed in rabbits in 1922. Antibodies against E. cuniculi have been detected in many mammals. Reports of human disease are limited to immunocompromised and AIDS patients, with only the rabbit and dog strains being potentially dangerous. In eastern Slovakia, the seroprevalence was 5.7%, and in humans with immunodeficiencies, it was as high as 37.5%. In horses, the seroprevalence ranges from 14% to 60%.

== Route of infection and disease development ==
The pathogen is commonly transmitted through oral ingestion of spores, which are primarily excreted in urine. Intrauterine transmission from mother to fetus is also possible. The infection is typically asymptomatic. Once ingested, the pathogen is taken up by phagocytes in the intestine and distributed via the bloodstream.

The pathogen invasion triggers an immune response in the host, which is mediated by cytotoxic CD8(+) T cells.

An outbreak of the disease may occur years after infection only if the immune system is disturbed, for example, if the animals are exposed to noise and stress. The pathogen primarily colonizes the kidneys in rabbits, causing chronic kidney inflammation with proliferation or atrophy of the epithelium of the renal tubules. Chronic infection in the brain and meninges leads to purulent inflammation (meningoencephalitis) with proliferation (gliosis) of the astrocytes and lymphocyte infiltration around the blood vessels. Additionally, spores can colonize the lens of the eye and cause phacoclastic uveitis, but this localization appears to occur exclusively during transmission in the womb. Tamarins have also been shown to cause inflammation of the heart muscle, liver, lungs, skeletal muscle, and retina. Immunocompromised mice have been shown to develop non-purulent, lymphocytic meningoencephalitis, which is characterized by neuronal death and astrogliosis. Horses can develop necrotizing inflammation of the placenta, also known as placentitis.

== Symptoms ==
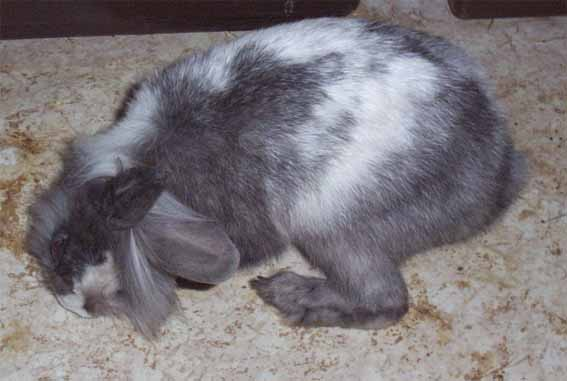
A rabbit infected with Encephalitozoonosis

The classic symptoms of Encephalitozoonosis in rabbits typically include neurological disorders such as torticollis, often accompanied by eye tremors (nystagmus), movement coordination disorders (ataxia), stiff gait, paralysis, and cramps. In advanced stages of the disease, animals with severe brain damage may uncontrollably turn around their own longitudinal axis and cause serious self-injury. However, the disease can also manifest itself as renal insufficiency or clouding of the lens, and inflammation of the middle membrane of the eye following rupture of the lens capsule (phacoclastic uveitis). In one study, 45% of affected rabbits showed neurological deficits, 31% had renal symptoms, and 14% had uveitis. Outdoor rabbits with neurological disorders are at risk of fly maggot infestation due to restricted movement and grooming limitations.

Encephalitozoonosis in dogs and foxes presents with symptoms of kidney failure and central nervous system dysfunction, similar to distemper. This disease has been observed in dogs in Africa and the United States, and in foxes in Scandinavia. In cats, the main cause of Encephalitozoonosis is eye infections, specifically phacoclastic uveitis, focal clouding of the lens, and anterior uveitis, with the mouse strain (type II) being the most likely trigger.

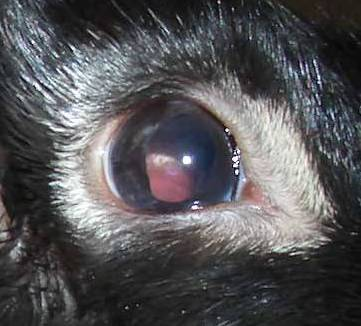
Encephalitozoonosis presenting as phacoclastic uveitis

Encephalitozoonosis is often only discovered at pathological dissection in other animals due to unspecific symptoms. However, in prosimians, stillbirths and sudden deaths of young animals can occur. The significance of serological detection of Encephalitozoon cuniculi in horses has not yet been clarified, as it is associated with both miscarriages and colic and neurological disorders. The section 'Danger to humans' describes the symptoms in immunosuppressed or HIV-infected individuals.

== Diagnosis ==
It is not possible to make a definitive diagnosis on a living animal.

The clinical diagnosis is always a suspected diagnosis. As many domestic rabbits carry the pathogen without becoming ill, a serological examination for antibodies (India-Ink immunoreaction, determination of titer by indirect immunofluorescence) against the pathogen can provide an indication of infection. However, it is important to exclude other diseases to confirm whether the existing symptoms are caused by this pathogen. An antibody titer can also be detected in over 40% of healthy rabbits. One study found average titers of 1:1324 in rabbits with a clinical suspicion of infection, which is around 1.7 times higher than in animals without such a suspicion. However, other studies have failed to establish a correlation between the level of titers and the disease. Furthermore, antibody levels can remain high for years after an infection. Rabbits infected in the womb typically lack antibodies due to self-tolerance. Direct detection of pathogen DNA through PCR in urine, feces, or cerebrospinal fluid is seldom successful. Moreover, pathogen DNA only appears in urine three to five weeks after infection and may also be present in some healthy animals. The diagnosis can usually only be definitively established through PCR on removed lens material in cases of phacoclastic uveitis.

Torticollis, the main symptom, may also occur in rabbits with inflammation of the inner ear (otitis interna), viral infections of the brain, listeriosis, toxoplasmosis, migrating larvae (larva migrans) of the raccoon roundworm, tumors (especially lymphomas) and abscesses of the brain, as well as head injuries. Additionally, cardiovascular diseases, poisoning, metabolic disorders, or spinal cord trauma can cause neurological deficits. Imaging techniques can be used to detect some of these diseases, which can indirectly rule out Encephalitozoonosis.

A reliable diagnosis can only be made after death through pathological examination to detect the pathogen. The pathogen can be detected through immunohistochemistry or PCR. Cultural cultivation is possible but very time-consuming.

== Danger to humans ==
Encephalitozoonosis is a potential zoonosis, but so far only cases in individuals with severely weakened immune systems, such as AIDS patients, people with immunosuppression after organ transplants, and idiopathic CD4+ T-lymphocytopenia, have been observed. Theoretically, individuals with weakened immune systems, such as very young children and the elderly, could also be susceptible, although there is currently no evidence to support this.

In most cases, infected animals have already excreted the pathogens over a long period of time. Although a large proportion of pet rabbits are seropositive, there is currently no evidence of human infection from rabbits or other animals. However, the route of infection in humans has not yet been clarified. There has been one case of human-to-human transmission of the dog strain during a bone marrow transplant in a Hodgkin's disease patient, who subsequently died of pneumonia.

In individuals with immunodeficiency, diarrheal diseases caused by infections with Encephalitozoon bieneusi and Encephalitozoon intestinalis are more common, while Encephalitozoon cuniculi infections are rare even in this population. Symptoms of the disease include fever, chest and abdominal pain, muscle aches, headache, cough, rhinitis, diarrhea, sinusitis, pneumonia, conjunctivitis, corneal inflammation, and kidney failure. Encephalitozoon hellem can cause keratoconjunctivitis and disseminated infection in humans. Only 17 cases of E. cuniculi infections in AIDS patients and 6 in people after organ transplantation have been reported since 1994. It is important to interpret older case descriptions with caution, as Encephalitozoon species cannot be distinguished by light microscopy. Molecular biological detection methods were only established in the 1990s.

== Treatment ==
Currently, there is no completely effective treatment for Encephalitozoonosis.

Eliminating the pathogen in rabbits is likely not possible, as many animals that improve clinically with treatment experience recurrent symptoms later on. Antiparasitic drugs such as Fenbendazole and Albendazole only reduce the pathogens and can limit new infections, but their effectiveness is limited in the case of a clinical outbreak of an Encephalitozoon cuniculi infection. Due to the immunocompromised state of rabbits during disease outbreaks, it is recommended to administer antibiotics such as Chloramphenicol, Gyrase inhibitors, Chloroquine phosphate, Oxytetracycline, or Sulphonamides. Glucocorticoids may also be used to reduce inflammation, but their use is controversial as they can suppress the body's T-cell response and cause severe side effects in rabbits. Additionally, animals should receive infusions, particularly when experiencing renal insufficiency. Regular monitoring of blood values is necessary. Some authors recommend administering a Vitamin B complex as a supportive measure. For rabbits displaying signs of paralysis, physiotherapy should be employed by moving the paralyzed limbs. In cases where rabbits are not eating on their own, force-feeding is necessary. It is important to keep sick animals away from noise and stress. Animals have a different hearing threshold than humans and can perceive sounds that are not recognizable to humans. In case of an eye disease, the only cure is the removal of the lens protein that has escaped from the ruptured lens capsule. Failure to do so will result in recurring episodes of severe uveitis.

Albendazole is used to treat Encephalitozoon cuniculi and other microsporidia in immunocompromised individuals with Encephalitozoonosis. Other therapeutic approaches include Polyamines, Chitin inhibitors like Nikkomycin and Fluoroquinolones, and Fumagillin for localized ocular inflammation.

Consistent hygiene measures can minimize the potential risk of animal-to-human transmission. In addition to daily removal of droppings and urine, it is necessary to clean the cage or enclosure with appropriate cleaning and disinfecting agents. Suitable disinfectants include boiling water, 2% Lysol, 1% formaldehyde, or 70% alcohol. After contact with animals, hands should be thoroughly washed to reduce the risk of transmitting Zoonotic diseases.

== Prospects of recovery ==
In some cases, rabbits can recover spontaneously without therapy. However, starting therapy as soon as possible generally leads to more favorable clinical recovery from head tilt and ataxia. If the neurological symptoms have been present for some time, complete healing (restitutio ad integrum) may take significantly longer. In particularly severe cases, it can take several months after the end of drug treatment for the head tilt to disappear. However, the disease can also cause permanent damage to the brain, resulting in a permanent head tilt. It is not advisable to administer Fenbendazole permanently as a precautionary measure, as the pathogen can develop resistance to the active ingredient and the substance can also have an immunosuppressive effect. A relapse is always possible. Severe infections can also be fatal or cause such severe permanent damage that euthanasia is indicated.

== Bibliography ==
- Abele-Horn, Marianne (2009). Antimikrobielle Therapie. Entscheidungshilfen zur Behandlung und Prophylaxe von Infektionskrankheiten [Antimicrobial Therapy. Decision-making Aids for the Treatment and Prophylaxis of Infectious Diseases] (in German). In collaboration with Werner Heinz, Hartwig Klinker, Johann Schurz and August Stich (2nd ed.). Marburg: Peter Wiehl. ISBN 978-3-927219-14-4.
- Akerstedt, J.; Nordstoga, K.; Mathis, A.; Smeds, E.; Deplazes, P. (2002). "Fox encephalitozoonosis: isolation of the agent from an outbreak in farmed blue foxes (Alopex lagopus) in Finland and some hitherto unreported pathologic lesions". Journal of Veterinary Medicine. B, Infectious Diseases and Veterinary Public Health. 49 (8): 400–405. doi:10.1046/j.1439-0450.2002.00588.x. ISSN 0931-1793. PMID 12449250.
- Baneux, P. J. R.; Pognan, F. (2003). "In utero transmission of Encephalitozoon cuniculi strain type I in rabbits". Laboratory Animals. 37 (2): 132–138. doi:10.1258/00236770360563778. ISSN 0023-6772. PMID 12689424.
- Benz, Petra; Maaß, Günter; Csokai, Jacqueline; Fuchs-Baumgartinger, Andrea; Schwendenwein, Ilse; Tichy, Alexander; Nell, Barbara (2011). "Detection of Encephalitozoon cuniculi in the feline cataractous lens". Veterinary Ophthalmology. 14 (s1): 37–47. doi:10.1111/j.1463-5224.2011.00873.x. ISSN 1463-5216. PMID 21923822.
- Botha, W. S.; van Dellen, A. F.; Stewart, C. G. (1979). "Canine encephalitozoonosis in South Africa". Journal of the South African Veterinary Association. 50 (2): 135–144. ISSN 1019-9128. PMID 551193.
- Cox, J. C.; Hamilton, R. C.; Attwood, H. D. (1979). "An investigation of the route and progression of Encephalitozoon cuniculi infection in adult rabbits". The Journal of Protozoology. 26 (2): 260–265. doi:10.1111/j.1550-7408.1979.tb02776.x. ISSN 0022-3921. PMID 490434.
- Cray, Carolyn; Arcia, Giselle; Schneider, Renata; Kelleher, Susan A.; Arheart, Kristopher L. (2009). "Evaluation of the usefulness of an ELISA and protein electrophoresis in the diagnosis of Encephalitozoon cuniculi infection in rabbits". American Journal of Veterinary Research. 70 (4): 478–482. doi:10.2460/ajvr.70.4.478. ISSN 0002-9645. PMID 19335103.
- Csokai, Jacqueline (2015). "Kopfschiefhaltung – Encephalitozoonose? Welche Diagnostikmöglichkeiten gibt es?". Veterinär spiegel (in German). 25 (2): 72–75. doi:10.1055/s-0034-1396194. ISSN 0940-8711.
- Didier, E. S.; Vossbrinck, C. R.; Baker, M. D.; Rogers, L. B.; Bertucci, D. C.; Shadduck, J. A. (1995). "Identification and characterization of three Encephalitozoon cuniculi strains". Parasitology. 111 (Pt 4): 411–421. doi:10.1017/s0031182000065914. ISSN 0031-1820. PMID 11023405.
- Didier, Elizabeth S.; Maddry, Joseph A.; Brindley, Paul J.; Stovall, Mary E.; Didier, Peter J. (2005). "Therapeutic strategies for human microsporidia infections". Expert Review of Anti-Infective Therapy. 3 (3): 419–434. doi:10.1586/14787210.3.3.419. ISSN 1744-8336. PMID 15954858.
- Ewringmann, Anja; Göbel, Thomas (1999). "Untersuchungen zur Klinik und Therapie der Encephalitozoonose beim Heimtierkaninchen" [Studies on the clinical picture and treatment of encephalitozoonosis in pet rabbits]. Kleintierpraxis (in German). 44 (5).
- Felchle, Lisa M.; Sigler, Ron L. (2002). "Phacoemulsification for the management of Encephalitozoon cuniculi-induced phacoclastic uveitis in a rabbit". Veterinary Ophthalmology. 5 (3): 211–215. doi:10.1046/j.1463-5224.2002.00240.x. ISSN 1463-5216. PMID 12236874.
- Göbel, Thomas (2006). "Encephalitozoonose: Häufigste Infektionskrankheit beim Kaninchen" [Encephalitozoonosis: the most common infectious disease in rabbits]. VETImpulse (in German). 15 (18).
- Giordano, C.; Weigt, A.; Vercelli, A.; Rondena, M.; Grilli, G.; Giudice, C. (2005). "Immunohistochemical identification of Encephalitozoon cuniculi in phacoclastic uveitis in four rabbits". Veterinary Ophthalmology. 8 (4): 271–275. doi:10.1111/j.1463-5224.2005.00394.x. ISSN 1463-5216. PMID 16008708.
- Goodwin, David; Gennari, Solange M.; Howe, Daniel K.; Dubey, J. P.; Zajac, Anne M.; Lindsay, David S. (2006). "Prevalence of antibodies to Encephalitozoon cuniculi in horses from Brazil". Veterinary Parasitology. 142 (3–4): 380–382. doi:10.1016/j.vetpar.2006.07.006. ISSN 0304-4017. PMID 16919878.
- Halánová, Monika; Cisláková, Lýdia; Valencákova, Alexandra; Bálent, Pavol; Adam, Jozef; Trávnicek, Milan (2003). "Serological screening of occurrence of antibodies to Encephalitozoon cuniculi in humans and animals in Eastern Slovakia". Annals of Agricultural and Environmental Medicine. 10 (1): 117–120. ISSN 1232-1966. PMID 12852743.
- Harcourt-Brown, F. M.; Holloway, H. K. R. (2003). "Encephalitozoon cuniculi in pet rabbits". The Veterinary Record. 152 (14): 427–431. doi:10.1136/vr.152.14.427. ISSN 0042-4900. PMID 12708591.
- Juan-Sallés, C.; Garner, M. M.; Didier, E. S.; Serrato, S.; Acevedo, L. D.; Ramos-Vara, J. A.; Nordhausen, R. W.; Bowers, L. C.; Parás, A. (2006). "Disseminated encephalitozoonosis in captive, juvenile, cotton-top (Saguinus oedipus) and neonatal emperor (Saguinus imperator) tamarins in North America". Veterinary Pathology. 43 (4): 438–446. doi:10.1354/vp.43-4-438. ISSN 0300-9858. PMID 16846985.
- Khan, Imtiaz A.; Moretto, Magali; Weiss, Louis M. (2001). "Immune response to Encephalitozoon cuniculi infection". Microbes and Infection / Institut Pasteur. 3 (5): 401–405. doi:10.1016/s1286-4579(01)01397-1. ISSN 1286-4579. PMC 3109655. PMID 11369277.
- Keeble, E. J.; Shaw, D. J. (2006). "Seroprevalence of antibodies to Encephalitozoon cuniculi in domestic rabbits in the United Kingdom". The Veterinary Record. 158 (16): 539–544. doi:10.1136/vr.158.16.539. ISSN 0042-4900. PMID 16632526.
- Künzel, Frank; Gruber, Andrea; Tichy, Alexander; Edelhofer, Renate; Nell, Barbara; Hassan, Jasmin; Leschnik, Michael; Thalhammer, Johann G.; Joachim, Anja (2008). "Clinical symptoms and diagnosis of encephalitozoonosis in pet rabbits". Veterinary Parasitology. 151 (2–4): 115–124. doi:10.1016/j.vetpar.2007.11.005. PMID 18164135.
- Künzel, Frank; Joachim, Anja (2010). "Encephalitozoonosis in rabbits". Parasitology Research. 106 (2): 299–309. doi:10.1007/s00436-009-1679-3. ISSN 0932-0113. PMID 19921257.
- Lallo, Maria Anete; Bondan, Eduardo Fernandes (2005). "Experimental meningoencephalomyelitis by Encephalitozoon cuniculi in cyclophosphamide-immunosuppressed mice". Arquivos de Neuro-Psiquiatria. 63 (2A): 246–251. doi:10.1590/s0004-282x2005000200010. ISSN 0004-282X. PMID 16100970.
- Levkutová, Mária; Hípiková, Vlasta; Faitelzon, Shay; Benath, Gad; Paulík, Stefan; Levkut, Mikulás (2004). "Prevalence of antibodies to Encephalitozoon cuniculi in horses in the Israel". Annals of Agricultural and Environmental Medicine. 11 (2): 265–267. ISSN 1232-1966. PMID 15627335.
- Mathis, Alexander; Weber, Rainer; Deplazes, Peter (2005). "Zoonotic potential of the microsporidia". Clinical Microbiology Reviews. 18 (3): 423–445. doi:10.1128/CMR.18.3.423-445.2005. ISSN 0893-8512. PMC 1195965. PMID 16020683.
- Mathis, A.; Michel, M.; Kuster, H.; Müller, C.; Weber, R.; Deplazes, P. (1997). "Two Encephalitozoon cuniculi strains of human origin are infectious to rabbits". Parasitology. 114 (Pt 1): 29–35. doi:10.1017/s0031182096008177. ISSN 0031-1820. PMID 9011071.
- Orenstein, J. M.; Russo, P.; Didier, E. S.; Bowers, C.; Bunin, N.; Teachey, D. T. (2005). "Fatal pulmonary microsporidiosis due to encephalitozoon cuniculi following allogeneic bone marrow transplantation for acute myelogenous leukemia". Ultrastructural Pathology. 29 (3–4): 269–276. doi:10.1080/01913120590951257. ISSN 0191-3123. PMID 16036880.
- Patterson-Kane, J. C.; Caplazi, P.; Rurangirwa, F.; Tramontin, R. R.; Wolfsdorf, K. (2003). "Encephalitozoon cuniculi placentitis and abortion in a quarterhorse mare". Journal of Veterinary Diagnostic Investigation. 15 (1): 57–59. doi:10.1177/104063870301500113. ISSN 1040-6387. PMID 12580298.
