= Water infection =

A water infection may refer to:

- Waterborne diseases
- Contaminated drinking water
- A urinary tract infection (UTI)
