= Johann Nikolaus Fürsen-Bachmann =

Schleswig-Holstein cavalry officer (1798–1894)

Johann Nikolaus von Fürsen-Bachmann
- Born: 31 July 1798; Tangsholm, Als, Duchy of Schleswig
- Died: 21 February 1894 (aged 95) Schleswig, Province of Schleswig-Holstein, Prussia, German Empire
- Allegiance: Danish monarchy Schleswig-Holstein
- Branch: Cavalry
- Rank: Colonel
- Commands: 1st Dragoon Regiment
- Conflicts: First Schleswig War
- Spouse: Juliane von Bachmann

Johann Nikolaus von Fürsen-Bachmann (31 July 1798 – 21 February 1894) was a Schleswig-Holstein cavalry officer. Trained in Copenhagen and initially serving in the Danish army, he later supported the Schleswig-Holstein provisional government during the First Schleswig War. From 1848 to 1851 he served as a lieutenant colonel and commander of the 1st Dragoon Regiment.

== Early life and Danish service ==
Fürsen-Bachmann was born at Tangsholm on the island of Als in the Duchy of Schleswig. He attended the cadet school in Copenhagen from 1812 to 1816 and was commissioned as a lieutenant in 1816. In 1823 he was ennobled by King Frederick VI of Denmark.

On 2 October 1824 he married Juliane von Bachmann, the daughter of Generalleutnant Hans von Bachmann. From 1831 to 1842 he served as a school officer in Schleswig.

== Schleswig-Holstein uprising ==
In late 1847, before the outbreak of the Schleswig-Holstein uprising, Fürsen-Bachmann was drawn into political-military discussions among leading Schleswig-Holstein figures. According to the biography of Wilhelm Beseler in Deutsche Biographie, the then Rittmeister Fürsen-Bachmann was consulted in a meeting involving Beseler and Count Reventlou, where the occupation of Rendsburg was considered a necessary condition for successful resistance.

The Schleswig-Holstein movement formed a provisional government on 24 March 1848, leading to the First Schleswig War. During the uprising Fürsen-Bachmann held the rank of lieutenant colonel and led the 1st Dragoon Regiment. His active service ended in 1851. After the defeat of the Schleswig-Holstein side, he lived in exile in Hamburg until 1864, when he returned to Schleswig.

== Later political activity and death ==
After returning to Schleswig in 1864, Fürsen-Bachmann was involved in Augustenburg political activity in North Schleswig. Historian Hans Schultz Hansen describes him as a trusted agent of the Augustenburg campaign; in March and April 1864 Hugo Jensen sent him to North Schleswig to establish a network of local contacts for the distribution of campaign material.

Fürsen-Bachmann died in Schleswig on 21 February 1894. His wife Juliane died there on 15 February 1898.

== Works and papers ==
Fürsen-Bachmann was one of the authors of Die vormärzlichen Schleswig-Holsteinischen Officiere am 24. März 1848, published in Schleswig in 1885. His memoirs were edited by Otto Fürsen and published posthumously in 1917 as Lebenserinnerungen des schleswig-holsteinischen Obersten Johann Nikolaus von Fürsen-Bachmann.

The Landesarchiv Schleswig-Holstein preserves a small collection of Fürsen-Bachmann papers, including letters from family members, officers and politicians dating from 1848 to 1891.
