= Wolke =

Wolke (German for "cloud") may refer to:

surname:

- Bruno Wolke, German cyclist
- Kay Rudi Wolke, member of Instant Clarity
- Manfred Wolke, German boxer
- Robert Wolke, professor of chemistry and author

given name:

- Wolke Hegenbarth, German actress

== See also ==
- Wolk (surname)
