= Donna Wolk =

American microbiologist

Donna Marie Wolk
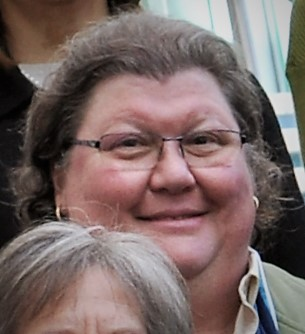
- Wolk in 2009
- Born: Pennsylvania
- Education: University of Arizona; Wilkes University; Pennsylvania State University
- Scientific career
- Fields: Microbiology
- Workplaces: Geisinger Medical Center; University of Arizona
- Thesis: Development and application of cell culture and molecular techniques for the diagnosis, identification, and viability testing of microsporidia (1999)

Donna M. Wolk is an American microbiologist who is Director of Clinical Microbiology at the Geisinger Health System. In 2017, she was honored by the American Society for Microbiology for her efforts to improve patient care using microbiology.

== Early life and education ==
Wolk grew up in a small town in rural Pennsylvania. She was the first in her family to attend college. She joined Pennsylvania State University as an undergraduate student, where she studied microbiology and clinical laboratory science. After graduating, Wolk trained as a medical technologist in Danville, Pennsylvania. She joined the Geisinger Medical Center, where she was eventually made Head of Clinical Microbiology.

== Research and career ==
Whilst Wolk enjoyed her career at the Geisinger Health System, she discovered that she was being paid considerably less than her male colleagues. She was told this wage disparity would only be rectified if she returned to college and completed a postgraduate degree, so she joined Wilkes University. Wolk returned to Geisinger, where she led the clinical microbiology laboratory for fourteen years.

Wolk returned to university in the mid-nineties to work toward a doctorate at the University of Arizona. She studied medical parasitology, demonstrating that chlorine could be used as an effective water treatment of Encephalitozoon syn. Septata intestinalis. She also demonstrated that spectrophotometric methods could be used for laboratory-based disinfection studies. After earning her doctorate, Wolk moved to the Mayo Clinic, where she completed a fellowship in clinical microbiology. During her fellowship, she developed a polymerase chain reaction (PCR) assay that could detect Encephalitozoon intestinalis in stool samples. Her rapid testing systems were translated out of the research lab, and used for the diagnostics of bacteria in emergency departments.

After completing her fellowship, Wolk returned to Arizona, where she was made Director of the Southern Arizona VA Health Care System. There she expanded the programs in clinical microbiology, and established the Infectious Diseases Research Core (IDRC), a Clinical Laboratory Improvement Amendments (CLIA) compliant research laboratory to test novel infectious diseases. In 2013, Wolk was offered the position of Director of Clinical Microbiology in the Geisinger Health System, where she was honored by the American Society for Microbiology for her efforts to improve patient care and medical outcomes using microbiology.

Wolk demonstrated that mass spectrometry could be used to differentiate biomarkers of anti-microbial resistance as well as in the diagnosis of bacteria and yeasts.

== Selected publications ==
- Andrew E Clark; Erin J Kaleta; Amit Arora; Donna M Wolk (1 July 2013). "Matrix-assisted laser desorption ionization-time of flight mass spectrometry: a fundamental shift in the routine practice of clinical microbiology". Clinical Microbiology Reviews. 26 (3): 547–603. doi:10.1128/cmr.00072-12. ISSN 0893-8512. PMC 3719498. PMID 23824373. Wikidata Q34653849.
- D M Wolk; M J Struelens; P Pancholi; et al. (14 January 2009). "Rapid detection of Staphylococcus aureus and methicillin-resistant S. aureus (MRSA) in wound specimens and blood cultures: multicenter preclinical evaluation of the Cepheid Xpert MRSA/SA skin and soft tissue and blood culture assays". Journal of Clinical Microbiology. 47 (3): 823–826. doi:10.1128/jcm.01884-08. ISSN 0095-1137. PMC 2650929. PMID 19144803. Wikidata Q41783624.
- Stephanie S Buehler; Bereneice Madison; Susan R Snyder; et al. (January 2016). "Effectiveness of Practices To Increase Timeliness of Providing Targeted Therapy for Inpatients with Bloodstream Infections: a Laboratory Medicine Best Practices Systematic Review and Meta-analysis". Clinical Microbiology Reviews. 29 (1): 59–103. doi:10.1128/cmr.00053-14. ISSN 0893-8512. PMC 4771213. PMID 26598385. Wikidata Q26776404.
