= Wölk =

Wölk or Woelk is a German surname. Notable people with the surname include:

- Ekkehard Wölk (born 1967), German pianist and composer
- Kevin Wölk (born 1985), German footballer
- Lothar Woelk (born 1954), German footballer
- Andrzej Wölk (born 1985), Polish footballer, policeman.
- Margot Wölk (1917–2014), Adolf Hitler's personal food taster
