= Julius Engel =

German judge and politician (1842–1926)

Julius Friedrich Theodor Engel
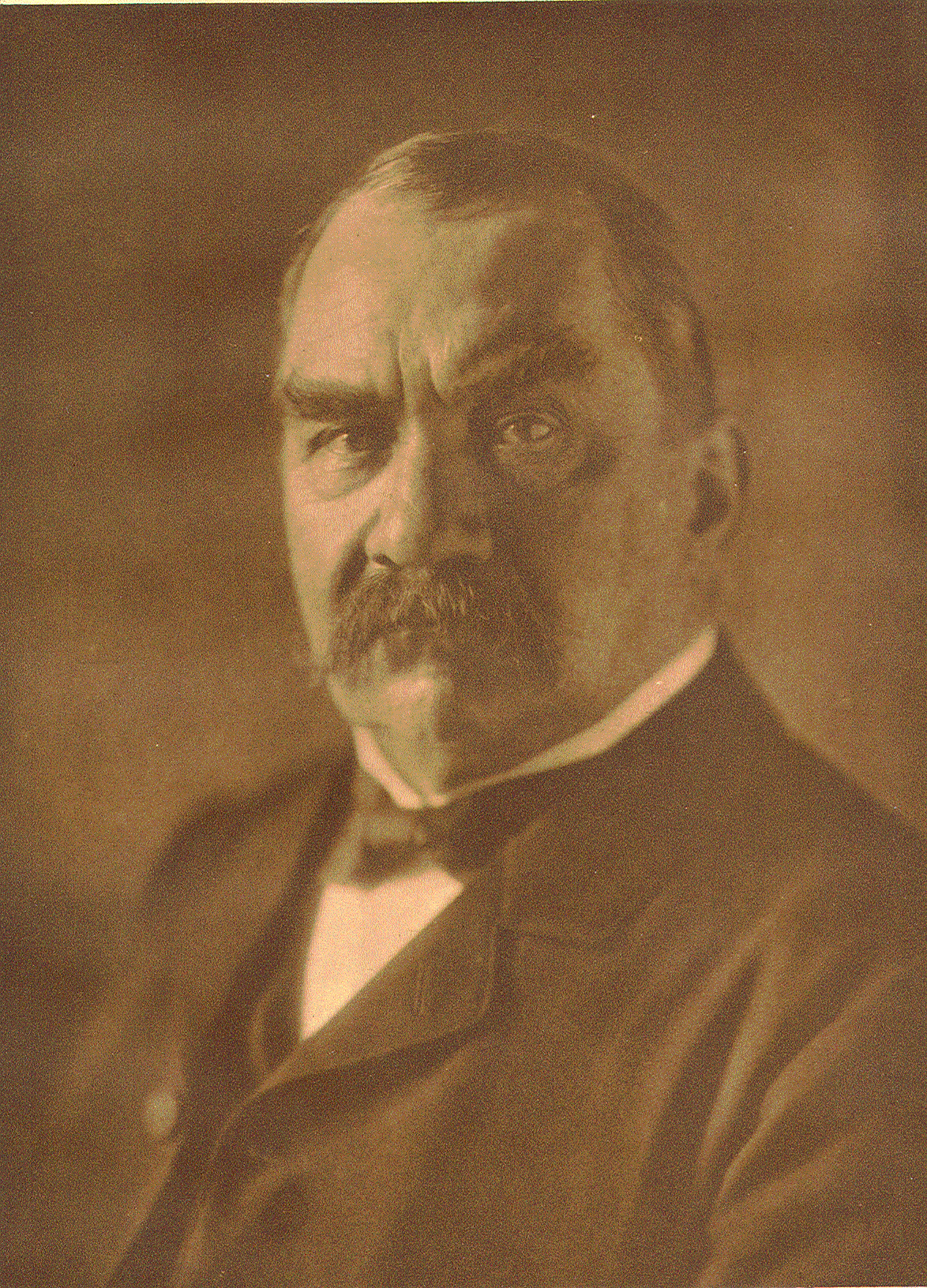

President of the Hamburg Parliament
- In office 1902–1913

Personal details
- Born: 27 August 1842; Schleswig, Germany
- Died: April 2, 1926 (aged 83); Hamburg, Germany
- Education: Law degree from Kiel University and Heidelberg University
- Occupation: Judge, politician

Julius Friedrich Theodor Engel (27 August 1842 in Schleswig – 2 April 1926 in Hamburg) was a German judge and politician. The lawyer was president of the Hamburg Parliament between 1902 and 1913.

Engel studied law in Kiel and Heidelberg until 1867 and became a Notar (roughly notary public) in Schleswig-Holstein a year later. He joined the public service of Hamburg in 1880 as a judge and was promoted to the office of president of the Landgericht Hamburg in 1901. He maintained this post until his retirement in 1917. On the political stage he was elected as a right-wing member of the Hamburgische Bürgerschaft in 1887 and served as president of this body between 1902 and 1913, when he stepped down as an MP.

Preceded by Siegmund Hinrichsen	President of the Hamburg Parliament; 1902–1913	Succeeded by Alexander Schön
