= Schleswig, Schleswig-Holstein =

Schleswig Slesvig (Danish)
- Town
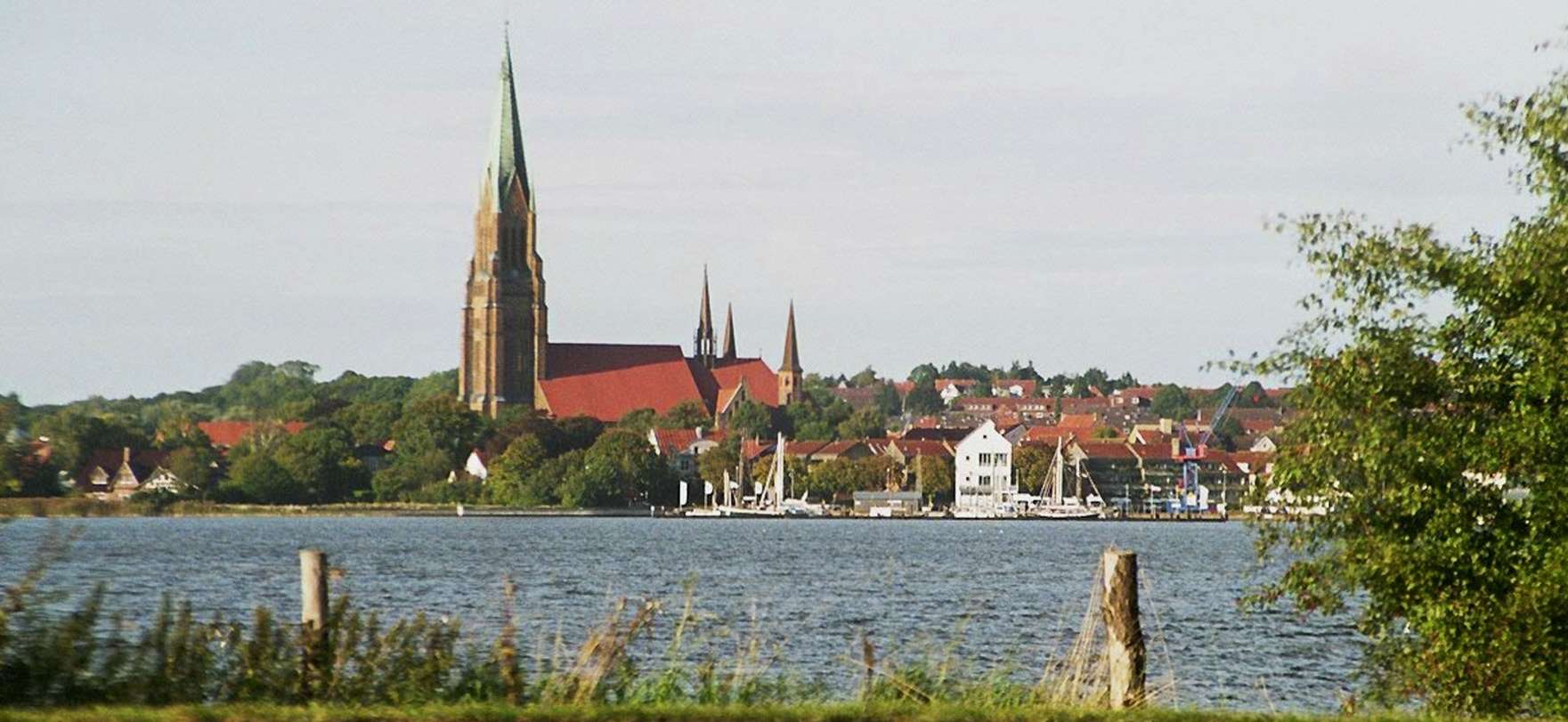
- St. Peter's Cathedral

- Flag Coat of arms

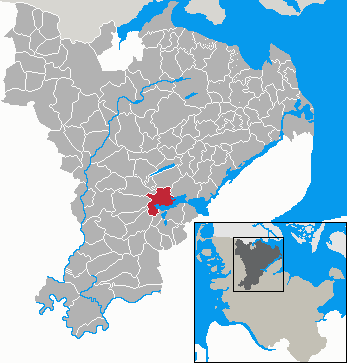
- Location of Schleswig within Schleswig-Flensburg district
- Interactive map of Schleswig
- Location within Germany Location within Schleswig-Holstein
- Coordinates: 54°31′07″N 9°33′55″E
- Country: Germany
- State: Schleswig-Holstein
- District: Schleswig-Flensburg

Government
  - Mayor: Stephan Dose (SPD)

Area
  - Total: 24.3 km^{2} (9.4 sq mi)
- Elevation: 1 m (3.3 ft)

Population (2025-12-31)
  - Total: 25,567
  - Density: 1,050/km^{2} (2,730/sq mi)
- Time zone: UTC+01:00 (CET)
  - Summer (DST): UTC+02:00 (CEST)
- Postal codes: 24837
- Dialling codes: 04621
- Vehicle registration: SL
- Website: www.schleswig.de

Schleswig (Note: UK: /ˈʃlɛsvɪɡ/, US: /-wɪɡ, -wɪk, -vɪk, ˈʃleɪsvɪk/; German: [ˈʃleːsvɪç]; Danish: Slesvig [ˈsle̝ːsvi]; South Jutlandic: Sljasvig; Low German: Sleswig) is a town in the northeastern part of Schleswig-Holstein, Germany. It is the capital of the Kreis (district) Schleswig-Flensburg. It has a population of about 27,000, the main industries being leather and food processing. It takes its name from the Schlei (Danish: Slien), an inlet of the Baltic Sea at the end of which it sits, and vik or vig which means "bay" in Old Norse and Danish. Schleswig or Slesvig therefore means "bay of the Schlei".

== History ==
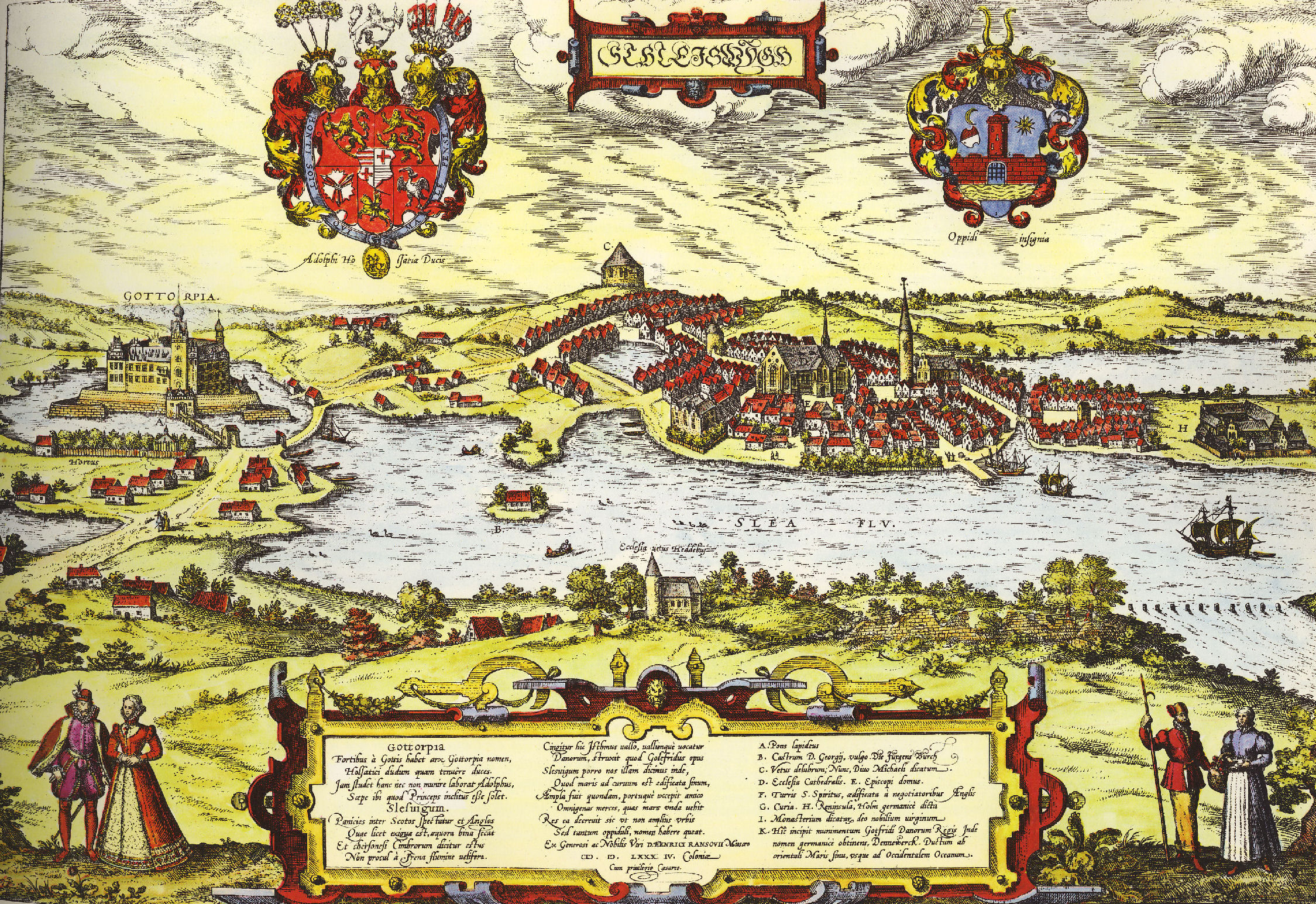
Schleswig in 1600

Today's small town has a great past, as it served as a major supraregional trading center, a bishop's seat, the residence of the dukes of Gottorf, and finally the capital of a Prussian province. Many historic buildings in Schleswig bear witness to the town's former importance.

The Viking settlement of Hedeby, located south of the modern town, was first mentioned in 804. It was a powerful settlement in the Baltic region, dominating the area for more than 200 years. In 1050, following several destructions, the population was moved to the opposite shore of the Schlei, becoming the city of Schleswig. In 1066 Hedeby was finally destroyed, and Schleswig remained a part of the Danish kingdom.

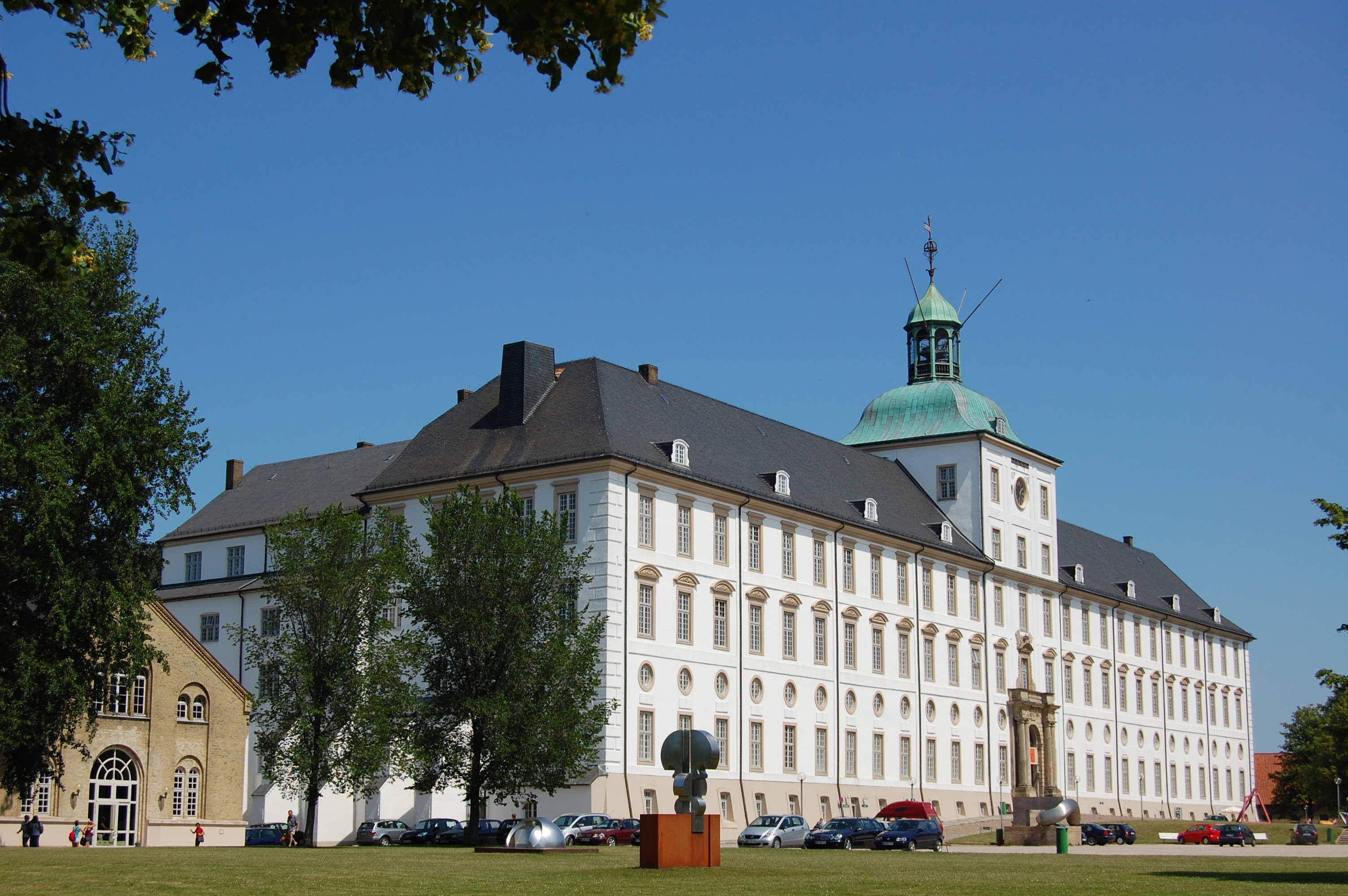
Gottorf castle

Schleswig became a bishopric in 947 and remained so until 1624. The first church building has disappeared, and the current Schleswig Cathedral was built starting in 1138. In 1544, Gottorf Castle became the residence of the local rulers. The dukes of Gottorf were vassals of the Danish kings and ruled over much of present-day Schleswig-Holstein. In 1721, when the Great Northern War ended, the dukes of Gottorf lost their power and most of their land, including Gottorf, became Danish crown land. After the Second Schleswig War (1864), Schleswig was annexed by the Kingdom of Prussia in 1867. Until 1917, Schleswig was the capital of the Prussian province of Schleswig-Holstein before it had to relinquish this function to Kiel. However, it remains the seat of the state's Higher Regional Court (Oberlandesgericht) to this day.

== Geography ==
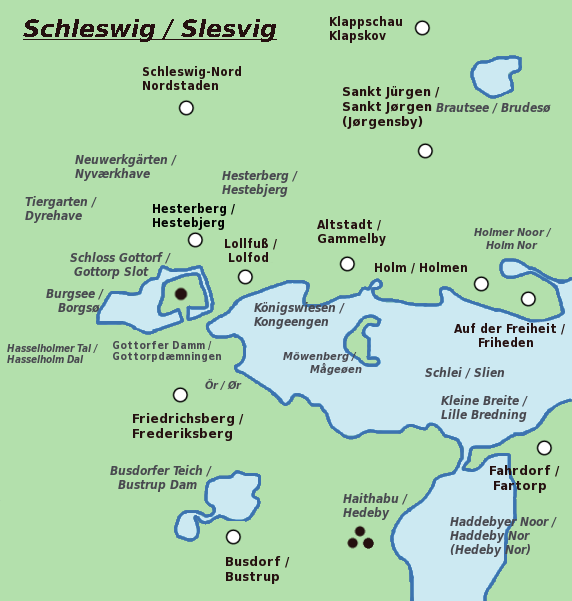
Map of Schleswig

Schleswig lies at the western end of the Schlei Förde, which separates the two peninsulas of Angeln and Schwansen, and is on the western edge of the Schleswig-Holstein Uplands on the transition to the Geest country. The urban area ranges from 0 to 20 m (66 ft) above sea level. Brautsee (lake) is in the town.

The nearest major cities are Flensburg, Husum and Kiel. Autobahn 7 runs immediately west of the city. Highways 76 and 77 end in Schleswig and B 201 runs to the north of the town. Schleswig station is a stop for InterCity and Intercity-Express trains and is on the Hamburg–Neumünster–Flensburg line.

=== Climate ===
The climate is oceanic (Köppen: Cfb), humid and mild with a slight continental influence. The annual mean temperature is 8 °C and precipitation averages 925 mm.

Climate data for Schleswig (1991–2020 normals)
Month	Jan	Feb	Mar	Apr	May	Jun	Jul	Aug	Sep	Oct	Nov	Dec	Year
Record high °C (°F)	11.7 (53.1)	14.3 (57.7)	20.2 (68.4)	25.7 (78.3)	27.6 (81.7)	30.5 (86.9)	31.1 (88.0)	32.0 (89.6)	29.3 (84.7)	23.9 (75.0)	17.8 (64.0)	13.7 (56.7)	32.0 (89.6)
Mean daily maximum °C (°F)	3.7 (38.7)	4.3 (39.7)	7.6 (45.7)	12.6 (54.7)	16.8 (62.2)	19.7 (67.5)	22.1 (71.8)	21.9 (71.4)	18.0 (64.4)	12.8 (55.0)	7.7 (45.9)	4.6 (40.3)	12.6 (54.7)
Daily mean °C (°F)	1.7 (35.1)	1.9 (35.4)	4.0 (39.2)	7.9 (46.2)	11.9 (53.4)	15.0 (59.0)	17.3 (63.1)	17.1 (62.8)	13.8 (56.8)	9.6 (49.3)	5.4 (41.7)	2.7 (36.9)	9.0 (48.2)
Mean daily minimum °C (°F)	−0.5 (31.1)	−0.5 (31.1)	1.0 (33.8)	3.8 (38.8)	7.2 (45.0)	10.5 (50.9)	12.9 (55.2)	13.0 (55.4)	10.3 (50.5)	6.7 (44.1)	3.1 (37.6)	0.6 (33.1)	5.6 (42.1)
Record low °C (°F)	−16.6 (2.1)	−18.0 (−0.4)	−13.7 (7.3)	−4.4 (24.1)	−1.1 (30.0)	2.2 (36.0)	5.6 (42.1)	6.0 (42.8)	2.3 (36.1)	−2.4 (27.7)	−11.5 (11.3)	−18.1 (−0.6)	−18.1 (−0.6)
Average precipitation mm (inches)	81.3 (3.20)	61.4 (2.42)	58.4 (2.30)	41.7 (1.64)	56.1 (2.21)	76.3 (3.00)	92.9 (3.66)	90.4 (3.56)	81.0 (3.19)	89.8 (3.54)	75.0 (2.95)	86.1 (3.39)	890.4 (35.06)
Average precipitation days (≥ 1.0 mm)	19.1	16.6	16.6	13.0	13.8	15.1	15.6	16.5	16.3	18.1	19.1	19.8	199.6
Average snowy days (≥ 1.0 cm)	7.4	7.5	4.1	0.2	0	0	0	0	0	0	0.8	4.5	24.5
Average relative humidity (%)	89.9	87.3	82.7	76.4	74.8	76.0	76.9	79.0	83.3	86.5	90.0	91.2	82.8
Mean monthly sunshine hours	43.7	62.8	119.7	186.0	234.7	220.9	226.6	207.8	148.5	101.7	54.4	37.2	1,646.4
Source: World Meteorological Organization

== Landmarks ==
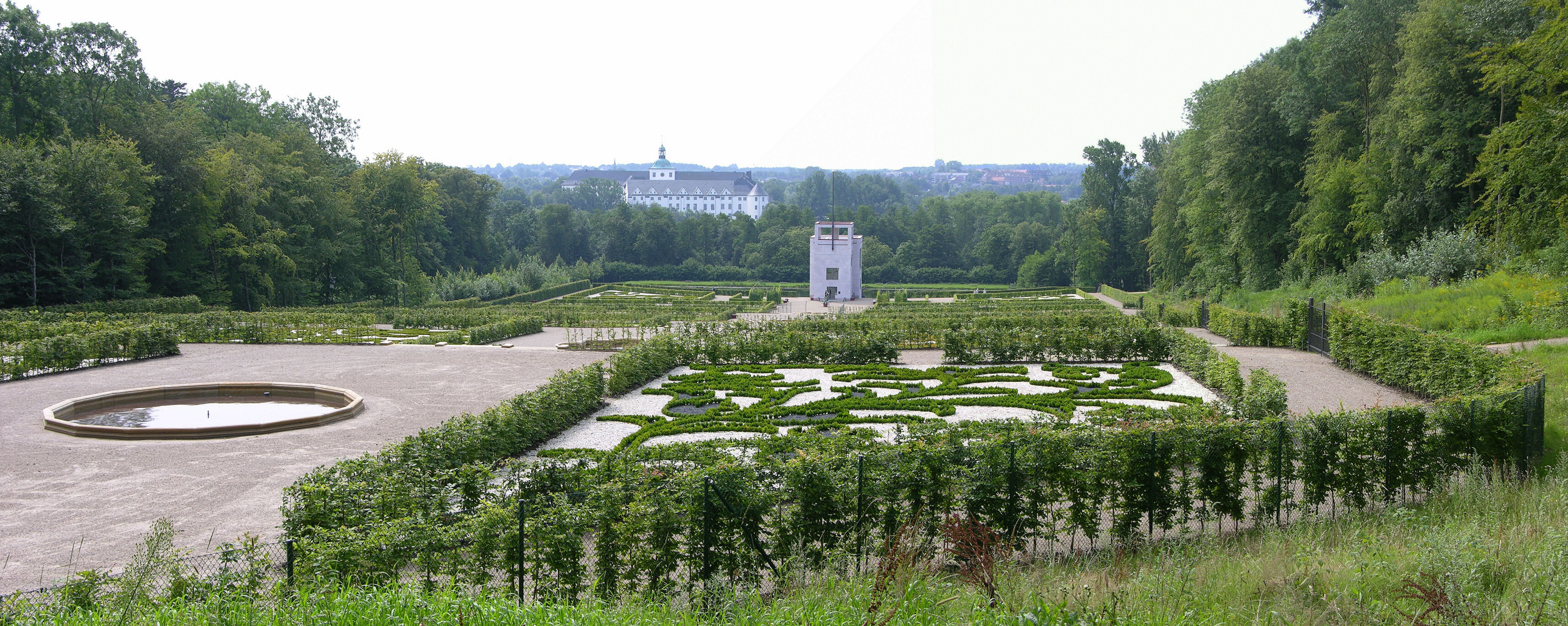
Neuwerk garden with the Globushaus and Gottorf Castle in the background

- Schleswig Cathedral (1134), with the tomb of King Frederick I of Denmark
- Gottorf Castle (built 1161), former residence of the dukes, with the baroque Neuwerk garden, containing a replica of the Globe of Gottorf
- Holm: old fishing village at the Schlei shore
- Hedeby, Viking settlement

== Twin towns – sister cities ==
Schleswig is twinned with:

- Hillingdon, England, United Kingdom
- Mantes-la-Jolie, France
- Vejle, Denmark
- Waren, Germany

== Notable people ==
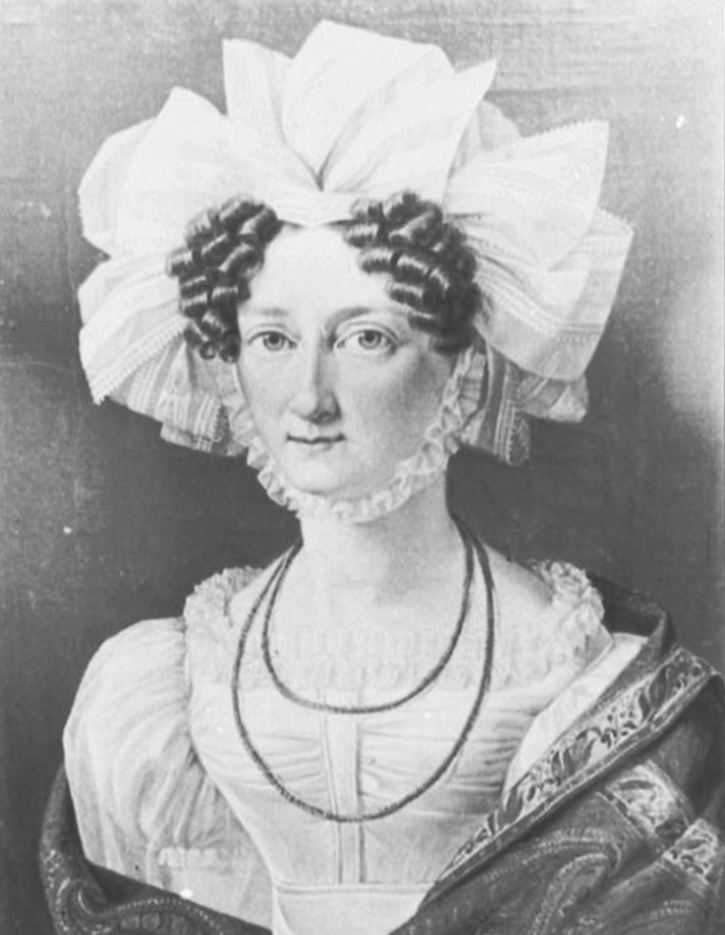
Princess Louise Caroline

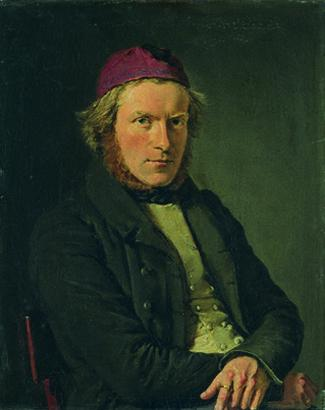
Herman Wilhelm Bissen

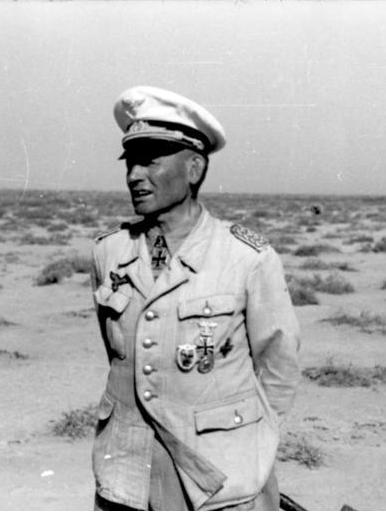
Hermann-Bernhard Ramcke

- Valdemar I of Denmark (1131–1182), King of Denmark from 1154 until his death in 1182.
- Christian III of Denmark (1503–1559), King of Denmark
- Adolf Frederick, King of Sweden (1710–1771), King of Sweden
- Frederick August I, Duke of Oldenburg (1711–1785), nobleman
- Asmus Jacob Carstens (1754–1798) a Danish-German painter, committed to German Neoclassicism.
- Princess Louise Caroline of Hesse-Kassel (1789–1867), matriarch of the House of Schleswig-Holstein-Sonderburg-Glücksburg
- Herman Wilhelm Bissen (1798–1868), Danish sculptor
- Friedrich Bernhard Westphal (1803–1844), German-Danish genre painter and illustrator
- Christian IX of Denmark (1818–1906), King of Denmark, 1863 - 1906.
- Karl Friedrich Wilhelm Jessen (1821–1889), botanist
- Frederick VIII, Duke of Schleswig-Holstein (1821–1889), patriarch of the House of Schleswig-Holstein-Sonderburg-Augustenburg
- Friedrich Krichauff (1824–1904), politician in colonial South Australia
- Victor Hensen (1835–1924), zoologist
- Ove H. Berg (1840–1922), American politician and businessman, emigrated to the US in 1881
- Julius Friedrich Theodor Engel (1842–1926), judge and politician
- Hans von Seeckt (1866–1936), military officer
- Ulrich von Brockdorff-Rantzau (1869–1928), politician and diplomat, first Foreign Minister of the Weimar Republic
- Christian Hansen (1885–1972), general
- Hermann-Bernhard Ramcke (1889–1968), General of paratroop forces
- Anton Franzen (1896–1968), lawyer, judge and politician
- Bernhard Rogge (1899–1982), naval officer
- Bernd Kröplin (1944–2019), engineer and academic
- Ralf Rothmann (born 1953), novelist
- Thomas Heberer (born 1965), musician and composer
- Ekkehard Wölk (born 1967), pianist, arranger and composer

=== Sport ===
- Jobst Hirscht (born 1948), athlete who competed mainly in the 100 metres
- Hole Rößler (born 1949), modern pentathlete
- Jan-Ingwer Callsen-Bracker (born 1984), footballer
