= National Outbreak Reporting System =

The National Outbreak Reporting System (NORS) is a web-based application managed by the Centers for Disease Control and Prevention (CDC) used primarily for reporting outbreaks of enteric diseases.

== History ==
NORS was launched in 2009 for use by staff working within public health departments in individual states, territories, and the Freely Associated States (composed of the Republic of the Marshall Islands, the Federated States of Micronesia and the Republic of Palau; formerly parts of the U.S.-administered Trust Territories of the Pacific Islands). Health departments are responsible for determining which staff members have access to NORS.

NORS replaced the electronic Foodborne Outbreak Reporting System (eFORS), which was the primary tool for reporting foodborne disease outbreaks to the U.S. Centers for Disease Control and Prevention (CDC) since 2001. NORS also replaced the paper-based reporting system used during 1971–2008 to report waterborne disease outbreaks to the Waterborne Disease and Outbreak Reporting System (WBDOSS). The transition to electronic waterborne disease outbreak reporting is, in large part, a response to the Council of State and Territorial Epidemiologists (CSTE) position statement titled "Improving Detection, Investigation, and Reporting of Waterborne Disease Outbreaks."

Separate sections in NORS for enteric person-to-person and animal-to-person disease outbreak reports are intended to enhance the information available to quantify, describe, and understand these types of outbreaks at a national level.

== Functionality ==
Only authorized users of state, local, and territorial public health agencies or other organizations are granted access to use NORS. When an outbreak occurs, these agencies begin an investigation by collecting and testing specimens. The health departments then report their findings through NORS, where the data is aggregated and analyzed by the CDC. Detailed information on how to use NORS is available on the CDC website. These training materials explain the process for creating reports, uploading laboratory and outbreak data, and addressing entry issues.

== See also ==
- Waterborne Disease and Outbreak Reporting System (WBDOSS)
