= Waterborne Disease and Outbreak Reporting System =

Disease surveillance system in the United States

The Waterborne Disease and Outbreak Surveillance System (WBDOSS) is a national surveillance system maintained by the U.S. Centers for Disease Control and Prevention (CDC). The WBDOSS receives data about waterborne disease outbreaks and single cases of waterborne diseases of public health importance (for example, Primary Amebic Meningoencephalitis (PAM)) in the United States and then disseminates information about these diseases, outbreaks, and their causes. WBDOSS was initiated in 1971 by CDC, the Council of State and Territorial Epidemiologists (CSTE), and the Environmental Protection Agency (EPA). Data are reported by public health departments in individual states, territories, and the Freely Associated States (composed of the Republic of the Marshall Islands, the Federated States of Micronesia and the Republic of Palau; formerly parts of the U.S.-administered Trust Territories of the Pacific Islands). Although initially designed to collect data about drinking water outbreaks in the United States, WBDOSS now includes outbreaks associated with recreational water, as well as outbreaks associated with water that is not intended for drinking (non-recreational) and water for which the intended use is unknown.

== Definition of a Waterborne Disease Outbreak ==
Waterborne disease outbreaks may be associated with recreational water, water intended for drinking, water not intended for drinking (non-recreational water, for example, from cooling towers or ornamental fountains) and water of unknown intent. In order for a waterborne disease outbreak to be included in WBDOSS there must be an epidemiologic link between two or more persons that includes a location of water exposure, a clearly defined time period for the water exposure, and one or more waterborne illnesses caused by pathogens such as bacteria, parasites and viruses, or by chemicals/toxins. Common routes of exposure to waterborne pathogens include swallowing contaminated water, inhaling water droplets or airborne chemicals from the water, and direct physical contact with contaminated water. Epidemiologic evidence must implicate water or volatile compounds from the water that have entered the air as the probable source of the illness. WBDOSS outbreaks are further evaluated and classified based on the strength of evidence in the outbreak report that implicates water as the source of the outbreak. Waterborne disease outbreaks that have both strong epidemiologic data and comprehensive water-quality testing data are assigned a higher class than outbreaks with weak epidemiologic data and little or no water-quality testing data.

== Data Sources for WBDOSS ==
Public health departments investigate waterborne disease outbreaks in states, territories, and Freely Associated States and are essential contributors to the WBDOSS. The primary reporting tool for WBDOSS prior to 2009 was the CDC 52.12 waterborne disease outbreak reporting form. Beginning in 2009, this form was replaced by the electronic National Outbreak Reporting System (NORS). Secondary data sources include case reports of water-associated cases of PAM caused by Naegleria fowleri infections, case reports for chemical/toxin poisoning and wound infections (reported sporadically), data about recreational water-associated Vibrio cases from the Cholera and Other Vibrio Surveillance System, and case reports for pool chemical-related health events not associated with recreational water (reported sporadically.

== Data Use ==
CDC has published WBDOSS surveillance summaries on an annual or biennial basis since 1971. Summary statistics and descriptions of waterborne disease outbreaks were published in CDC reports until 1984 and have been published in the Morbidity and Mortality Weekly Report (MMWR) since 1985. Public health researchers and policy makers use the data to understand and reduce waterborne disease and outbreaks. WBDOSS data are available to support EPA efforts to improve drinking water quality and to provide direction for CDC’s recreational water activities, such as the Healthy Swimming program.

== See also ==
- National Outbreak Reporting System (NORS)
