= Anncaliia algerae =

Scientific classification
- Kingdom: Fungi
- Phylum: Rozellomycota
- Class: Microsporidia
- Genus: Anncaliia
- Species: A. algerae

Binomial name
- Anncaliia algerae (Vávra & Undeen) C. Franzen, E.S. Nassonova, J. Schölmerich & I.V. Issi

Species of aquatic unicellular parasite

Anncaliia algerae is an aquatic unicellular parasite in the division microsporidium. A. algerae most commonly infects mosquitoes.

== Pathologies ==
A. algerae, former genera Nosema and Brachiola, is an emerging human pathogen. It has caused severe myositis in patients taking immunosuppressive medication for rheumatoid arthritis or solid-organ transplantation. It also has led to skin abscesses and an infection of the false vocal cord in patients receiving chemotherapy for hematologic malignancies and caused keratitis in a man with no significant medical history. Cases discussed in Emerging Infectious Diseases in February 2014 show that A. algerae myositis caused fever, weight loss, fatigue, generalized muscle weakness and pain, dysphagia, glossitis, peripheral edema, and diarrhea. The journal concludes that "A. algerae myositis is [an] uncommon infection and has a high case-fatality rate."
