= William Wolk =

American painter

William Wolk (January, 1951 - May, 2022) was an American realist painter working in West Virginia. From 1984 through 2008, he hosted his namesake one-man gallery at The Greenbrier, a 6,500 acre resort. His primary working studio was maintained in West Virginia till 2008. William Wolk Fine Art is now located in Sarasota, Florida.

== Life ==
William Wolk was born on January 12, 1951, in Miami Beach, Florida. As a child, he began drawing from a very early age, executing free hand portraits in charcoal at age eight and insisting on painting in oils at age nine. By age sixteen, Wolk made his professional debut by selling nine paintings in the fourth annual Coconut Grove arts Festival in Coconut Grove, Florida. Wolk studied in Europe and at the Academy of Fine Arts; Florence, Italy and at The Ringling College of Art and Design in Sarasota, Florida. Despite the training he received in drawing, he is essentially a self-taught painter. His classical inclinations sprung from his affinity for the work of artists as varied as Andrew Wyeth, Bouguereau, Rembrandt and a host of High Renaissance painters. While living in Florence, he copied from the masters at the Uffizi Gallery, and the many churches and public works throughout the city and in Rome. At age nineteen, after returning from Europe, Wolk had his first one-man-show at the Vassili Gallery in Coral Gables, Florida. Over the following twenty years, Wolk lived and exhibited in a number of U.S. cities; Atlanta, GA; Miami, FL; Santa Cruz, CA and New York, NY. It was in New York City in the early eighties that Wolk focused on The Dance as his subject. He received the distinction, Artist-in Residence at The Harkness House on East 75th Street, which hosted a one-man-exhibition of over forty of his dance works. Another one-man-show was held at the Lincoln Center Gallery in the Metropolitan Opera House. It was also at this time that three of Wolk's dance works were published and distributed worldwide by Bruce McGaw graphics.

Cautious about being “type-cast” as a dance painter, Wolk moved to rural West Virginia in 1983, adding watercolor to his repertoire. Expanding his subjects to include landscape, animals, still life and portraits, Wolk founded his one-man gallery, The William Wolk Gallery of Fine Art at The Greenbrier in 1984. In May 2008, Wolk ended his twenty-five-year-long relationship with The Greenbrier and relocated his collection of paintings to his mountaintop home. Within three months, a massive fire destroyed the home completely including all of the contents, which included a majority of the Wolk collection. Work that survived was either in the artist's studio, located across the driveway from the residence, or in galleries and museums around the country. William Wolk and his wife, Marie, lived in southeastern West Virginia until 2010 at which time they moved to Sarasota, Florida.

== Work ==
William Wolk was a Realist painter. His subject matter focuses on the figure, portraiture, still life, animals and landscape. His subject selection continually grows. As an example, paintings of the American flag appeared in his repertoire of still-life paintings in 2006 and are portrayed as a serious interior study of a visually complicated subject. On November 6, 2007, Wolk was honored in the Oval Office for his post 9/11 portrait of president G.W. Bush. The portrait was inducted into the presidential collection. On January 12, 2009, Wolk's portrait of the legendary golfer, Sam Snead was acquired for the permanent collection of the USGA Museum in Far Hills, New Jersey. A portrait of the artist at work, entitled Standing Behind Myself, is in the permanent collection of the Guilford College Art Gallery in Greensboro, North Carolina.

== The Tibet painting ==
In 2008, William & Marie Wolk founded a 501 (c) (3) foundation entitled Friends of Kharnang to support the projects of Yangtul Kharnang Rinpoche, a Tibetan Lama. The Wolk's met the Rinpoche in West Virginia and felt moved to help him accomplish the many projects, including the building of a hospital, a home for the aged, running water, classrooms for monks and students, etc. that he is undertaking for the benefit of the monastery and the nomadic population of the region. William Wolk created The Tibet Painting as a fundraiser. The painting features a portrait of the Dalai Lama and took a year and a half to complete.
