= Enterocytozoon bieneusi =

Scientific classification
- Kingdom: Fungi
- Division: Microsporidia
- Order: Chytridiopsida
- Family: Enterocytozoonidae
- Genus: Enterocytozoon
- Species: E. bieneusi

Binomial name
- Enterocytozoon bieneusi F. Desp., Le Charpentier, Galian, Bernard, Cochand-Priollet, Lavergne, Ravisse & Modigliani

Species of parasitic fungus

Enterocytozoon bieneusi is a species of the order Chytridiopsida (in the division Microsporidia) which infects the intestinal epithelial cells. It is an obligate intracellular parasite.

== Microbiology ==
Enterocytozoon bieneusi, commonly known as microsporidia, is a unicellular, obligate intracellular eukaryote. Their life cycle includes a proliferative merogonic stage, followed by a sporogonic stage resulting in small, environmentally resistant, infective spores, which is their transmission mode. The spores contain a long, coiled polar tube, which distinguishes them from all other organisms and has a crucial role in host cell invasion. E. bieneusi was first found in an AIDS patient in France in 1985 and was later found in swine in 1996 in fecal samples. It causes diarrhea—thus the pigs excrete more spores, causing the disease to spread. As this pathogen is very prevalent throughout the world, E. bieneusi is found in a wide variety of hosts including pigs, humans, and other mammals. E. bieneusi can be studied using TEM, light microscopy, PCR and immunofluorescence and can be cultured for short-term. It is not yet known whether the pathogen itself can be infected by other diseases. There seems to be widespread economic implications of infection by this pathogen for the swine industry. Several treatments, including fumagillin and albendazole have shown promise in treating infection (Mathis et al. 2005).

== Discovering the disease ==
The earliest reference to the order Microsporidia was in the mid-20th century. E. bieneusi was first found in an AIDS patient in France in 1985. The electron microscope studies revealed presence of developmental stages of parasite resembling microsporidia. The investigators then named it as E. bieneusi (Desportes et al. 1985). The presence of E. bieneusi in swine was first detected in fecal samples of pigs in Zurich, Switzerland in 1996 (Deplazes et al. 1996)

== Culturing ==
Short-term culturing of E. bieneusi was achieved by inoculating duodenal aspirate and biopsy specimens into E6 and HLF monolayers. The short-term cultures lasted up to 6 months. After several weeks of culture, gram-positive spore-like structures measuring 1 to 1.2 um long were observed. Mature spores and sporoblasts with double rows of polar tubule coils were seen (Visvesvara 2002). Long term culturing seems to be unsuccessful.

== Study and detection methods ==
Light microscopy of stained clinical smears, especially of fecal samples, is used to diagnose microsporidia infections.. Transmission electron microscopy is required to differentiate between species of microsporidia, but it is time-consuming and expensive. Immunofluorescence Assays using monoclonal and polyclonal antibodies are used, and PCR has recently been employed for E. bieneusi (CDC).

== Life cycle ==
1. The infective form of E. bieneusi is the resistant spore and it can survive for a long time in the environment.
2. The spore extends its polar tubule and infects the host cell.
3. The spore injects the infective sporoplasm into the eukaryotic host cell through the polar tubule.
4. Inside the cell, the sporoplasm undergoes extensive multiplication either by merogony (binary fission) or schizogony (multiple fission).
5. This development occurs in direct contact with the host cell cytoplasm. In the cytoplasm, microsporidia develop by sporogony to mature spores.
6. During sporogony, a thick wall is formed around the spore, which provides resistance to adverse environmental conditions. When the spores increase in number and completely fill the host cell cytoplasm, the cell membrane is disrupted and releases the spores to the surroundings. These free mature spores can infect new cells thus continuing the cycle (Desportes 1985).

== Transmission mode ==
Enerocytozoon bieneusi is transported through environment resistant spores.

Common environmental sources of E. bieneusi include ditch and other surface waters, and several species of microsporidia can be isolated from such sources indicating that the disease may be waterborne.

The different modes of transmission that may be possible include the fecal-oral or oral-oral route, inhalation of aerosols, or ingestion of food contaminated with fecal material (Mathis et al. 2005). Furthermore, there seem to be a close relationship between E. bieneusi strains from humans and pigs, suggesting the absence of transmission barrier between pigs and humans for this parasite (Rinder et al. 2000).

Animals, particularly pigs, may play a role of zoonotic reservoir in transmitting the disease to other organisms (Abreu-Acosta et al. 2005), (Lores et al. 2002). Both vertical and horizontal transmissions are possible.

== Hosts ==
Hosts include pigs, fish, birds, cattle, humans (including H. neanderthalensis), and other mammals, such as apes.

== Effects on hosts ==
Enterocytozoon bieneusi is a common parasite in pigs and it causes diarrhea, from self-limited to severe forms. This is documented by the lack of intestinal lesions in pigs experimentally infected with E. bieneusi (Mathis et al. 2005). The pigs that were infected with this disease excreted more spores.

== Treatment ==
Inhibitors of chitin synthase enzymes seem to be effective against this pathogen. Fumagillin and albendazole treatments seem promising in swine (Mathis et al. 2005).

== Prevalence ==
It is very common in pigs and seems to be a natural pathogen in animals such as pigs (Lores et al. 2002). In some communities of pigs, the prevalence rates of E. bieneusi reached 37% (Mathias et al. 2005). There are no recorded large epidemics yet. PCR analysis in Czech Republic revealed existence of E. bieneusi in 94% of the samples indicating the large presence of E. bieneusi in swine, and that they may be naturally occurring (Sak et al. 2008).

== Economic impact ==
Since this is a relatively new finding in pigs, its economic impact has not been studied yet. Pig farming in the US has an annual revenue of $18 billion and the US has about 75000 pig farms. Infection in even a few pigs can be devastating, as the disease is easily spread. Moreover, these pigs can serve as zoonotic reservoirs for E. bieneusi, making transmission to other animals and humans possible. Since the transmission from swine to other humans and animals is not studied yet, this may cause a major impact on the health of this country. Moreover, in other parts of the world, such as China, where the pig industry is a major economic component and where humans and pigs live in crowded conditions, the disease can be very easily spread and can have a potentially major impact on the economy.
