= Anncaliia =

Scientific classification
- Kingdom: Fungi
- Phylum: Rozellomycota
- Class: Microsporidia
- Genus: Anncaliia (Vávra & Undeen) C. Franzen, E.S. Nassonova, J. Schölmerich & I.V. Issi

Species
- Anncaliia algerae; Anncaliia connori; Anncaliia gambiae; Anncaliia meligethi; Anncaliia varivestis; Anncaliia vesicularum

Genus of fungi

Anncaliia is a genus of aquatic unicellular parasite in the division Microsporidia.
