= Encephalitozoon cuniculi =

Scientific classification
- Kingdom: Fungi
- Phylum: Microsporidia
- Suborder: Apansporoblastina
- Family: Unikaryonidae
- Genus: Encephalitozoon
- Species: E. cuniculi

Binomial name
- Encephalitozoon cuniculi C. Levaditi, Nicolau & R. Schoen, 1923

Microsporidial pathogen

Encephalitozoon cuniculi is a microsporidial parasite of mammals with world-wide distribution. An important cause of neurologic and renal disease in rabbits, E. cuniculi can also cause disease in immunocompromised people.

Its current accepted name is Nosema cuniculi.

== Classification and cell structure ==
E. cuniculi is a microsporidial, unicellular, obligate intracellular, eukaryotic, parasite. It belongs to the phylum Microsporidia. Microsporidia are parasitic fungi infecting many animal groups. Lacking mitochondria and peroxysomes, they were first considered a deeply branching protist lineage that diverged before the endosymbiotic event that led to mitochondria. The discovery of a gene for a mitochondrial-type chaperone combined with molecular phylogenetic data later implied that microsporidia are atypical fungi that lost mitochondria during evolution. The genome reflects this dependency, with significant gene loss across biosynthetic and metabolic pathways. In veterinary taxonomy, E. cuniculi has been placed within the genus Encephalitozoon due to its unique life cycle characteristics and infection patterns across multiple host species

== Genome ==
The genome consists of approximately 2.9-megabases (Mbs) in 11 chromosomes, with a total of 1,997 potential protein-coding genes. Genome compaction is reflected by reduced intergenic spacers and by the shortness of most putative proteins relative to their eukaryote orthologues. At the time of publication (2001), only 44% of the proteins had a function assigned to them. the latest reference proteome in Uniprot (2021) lists 2041 proteins with ~620 proteins annotated as "uncharacterized", about 200 without annotation (e.g. "UPF0329 protein ECU06_1620") and another ~150 or so that are annotated as having some "domain" (including domains of unknown function) and numerous proteins of "probable" and "putative" function plus dozens with "similarity" to characterized proteins. Hence, even 20 years after the genome sequence was published, about 50% of the E. cuniculi proteome remains uncharacterized or poorly understood.

The strong host dependence is illustrated by the lack of genes for some biosynthetic pathways and for the tricarboxylic acid cycle. Phylogenetic analysis lends substantial credit to the fungal affiliation of microsporidia. Because the E. cuniculi genome contains genes related to some mitochondrial functions (for example, Fe-S cluster assembly), it is possible that microsporidia have retained a mitochondrion-derived organelle.

== Life cycle and pathogenesis ==
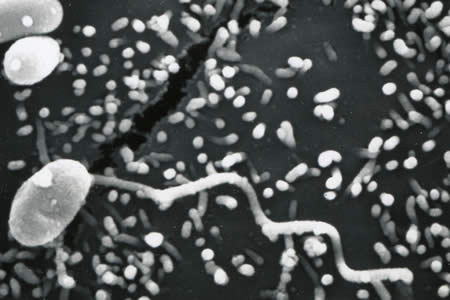
Microsporidian spore with an extruded polar tubule inserted into a eukaryotic cell.

The infective form of microsporidia (E. cuniculi) is a resistant spore which can survive for a long time in the environment. The spore extrudes its polar tubule and infects the host cell. The spore injects the infective sporoplasm into the eukaryotic host cell through a polar tube. Inside the cell, the sporoplasm undergoes extensive multiplication. This multiplication occurs either by merogony (binary fission) or schizogony (multiple fission). Host cell mitochondria often cluster around the developing parasite, suggesting a role in parasite development or nutrient acquisition. Microsporidia develop by sporogony to mature spores in the cytoplasm or inside parasitophorous vacuole. During sporogony, a thick wall is formed around the spore. The thick wall formed provides resistance to adverse environmental conditions. Once the spores increase in number and completely fill the cytoplasm of the host's cell, the cell membrane is disrupted and releases the spores to the surroundings. These free mature spores can infect new cells thus continuing the cycle. Vertical transmission has also been reported in rabbits, with spores transmitted transplacentally or during birth.

=== DNA repair ===
E. cuniculi has undergone an evolutionary process of genome reduction that has affected all major DNA repair pathways. DNA double-strand breaks are one of the most detrimental forms of DNA damage, as they can cause genome fragmentation if not repaired. More than half of the proteins that ordinarily participate in the two double strand break repair pathways, homologous recombinational repair and non-homologous end joining, are absent in E. cuniculi compared to other related species. The remaining proteins are all involved in additional cellular functions (such as meiosis).

== Epidemiology ==
First identified in rabbits, E. cuniculi infections have been reported worldwide in over 20 mammalian species, including humans. Prevalence in pet rabbits is high, with 23–75% having antibodies to the disease. Studies of healthy dogs have found a 0–38% prevalence. Cats appear to be relatively resistant to the organism, although experimental infections in kittens with feline leukemia virus have been described. Recent guidelines from European researchers confirm that cats can serve as hosts under certain conditions, such as immunosuppression. E. cuniculi also infects rodents, and the organism has been detected in the feces of 13% of pet birds. A small percentage of healthy people have antibodies to the organism, indicating previous exposure. Seroprevalence rates are higher in immunocompromised people, and in those who live in or have visited tropical countries. Most infections do not result in clinical disease.

E. cuniculi spores are usually shed in urine, but can also be found in the feces and respiratory secretions of infected animals. Spores can be detected in urine 38 to 63 days after infection, with intermittent shedding thereafter. Ingestion of spores is the main route of transmission, although inhalation of spores can also occur. Transplacental and intrauterine infections have been documented in rabbits.

Farm-based studies have identified contaminated water sources as a potential environmental reservoir, emphasizing the importance of water sanitation in preventing herd outbreaks.

== Infections in rabbits ==
=== Clinical presentation ===
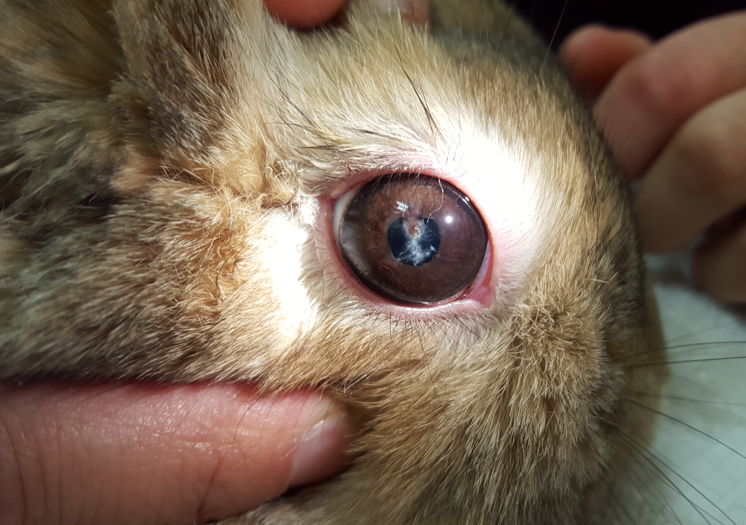
Rabbit with uveitis caused by Encephalitozoon cuniculi

Up to 80% of rabbits in the United States and Europe are serologically positive for E. cuniculi, which indicates that they have been exposed to the organism. Most of these animals will remain asymptomatic and never show signs of disease. Only a small minority of infected rabbits develop the disease encephalitozoonosis. The most common clinical signs associated with this disease involve the central nervous system, eyes, and kidneys.

Most rabbits with neurologic signs show vestibular dysfunction only. Symptoms often appear suddenly, and include head tilt, ataxia, nystagmus, and circling. In addition to neurological signs such as head tilt and ataxia, infected rabbits frequently present with renal dysfunction, including polyuria and polydipsia. A 2024 study in Thailand found that seropositive rabbits also showed significant hematologic abnormalities, such as anemia. Most of these animals are still aware of their surroundings and are eating despite their loss of balance. More severely affected rabbits, such as those which can no longer stand, have a worse prognosis.

E. cuniculi infections in the eye cause cataract formation, white intraocular masses, and uveitis. Symptoms usually occur in young rabbits, and only one eye is generally affected. Rabbits with ocular lesions related to encephalitozoonosis are usually otherwise healthy, and tolerate vision loss well.

E. cuniculi has a predilection for the kidneys and can cause chronic or acute kidney failure. Symptoms of renal impairment include increased water consumption, increased urine output, loss of appetite, weight loss, lethargy, and dehydration. Milder cases do not cause symptoms, and signs of infection may be an incidental finding on necropsy.

=== Diagnosis ===
It is currently difficult to definitively diagnose E. cuniculi infections in live rabbits. A presumptive diagnosis is often made based on consistent clinical signs and high antibody levels. Serology tests that look for IgG antibodies are commonly run, and can be used to rule out the disease if negative. However, a positive IgG titer cannot differentiate an active infection from a previous infection or an asymptomatic carrier state. Tests for IgM antibodies are also available, but again positive results cannot distinguish between active and latent infections.

Polymerase chain reaction (PCR) has long been established as the standard technique for detection of microsporidia in humans, and attempts to apply this to rabbits are ongoing. Studies have found that PCR of liquified lens material is a reliable means of diagnosing E. cuniculi uveitis in rabbits, but PCR testing of rabbit urine and cerebrospinal fluid is not reliable.

=== Treatment ===
A few studies have shown that albendazole, a benzimidazole drug, can prevent and treat naturally acquired and experimentally induced E. cuniculi infections. However, the elimination of spores from the central nervous system does not always result in resolution of clinical signs. Adverse reactions to benzimidazole drugs, including injury to the small intestine and bone marrow, have been reported in rabbits. Practitioners should strictly adhere to recommended dosages and treatment intervals, and consider monitoring complete blood counts during treatment. Fenbendazole is more commonly used due to its favorable safety profile, with typical treatment regimens lasting 28 days. NSAIDs or corticosteroids may be added to reduce inflammation and manage pain, especially in neurologically affected animals.

=== Holistic treatment and care ===
Holistic approaches are occasionally employed alongside conventional treatment to support overall well-being in rabbits with E. cuniculi. These may include stress reduction, dietary optimization, hydration therapy, and use of antioxidant supplements. While there is limited peer-reviewed evidence for their standalone efficacy, such supportive care can help improve quality of life and recovery potential in some cases. The Royal Veterinary College recommends that owners ensure good husbandry, a quiet environment, and proper nutrition during recovery from E. cuniculi infection.

Owner-care and rehabilitation tips include maintaining a consistent daily routine to minimize stress, offering easily accessible food and water bowls, and using low-entry litter boxes for neurologically compromised rabbits. Gentle physical therapy may help improve coordination in rabbits recovering from severe vestibular symptoms. Long-term monitoring of kidney function is advised in cases where renal involvement has occurred.

In more severe cases, rabbits may require temporary critical care, including syringe feeding, subcutaneous fluids, and assisted mobility. Veterinary sources such as Quesenberry's "Ferrets, Rabbits, and Rodents: Clinical Medicine and Surgery" emphasize the need for individualized care plans and monitoring for relapse or progression.

== Infections in humans ==
E. cuniculi is an important opportunistic pathogen in people, particularly those immunocompromised by HIV/AIDS, organ transplantation, or CD4+ T-lymphocyte deficiency. As this organism is more common in animals than people it is likely a zoonotic disease. Three different strains of E. cuniculi have been identified, and are classified as I (rabbit), II (mouse), and III (dog). Human-to-human transmission is possible via transplantation of solid organs from an infected donor. The parasite's zoonotic potential has prompted calls for routine screening in animal-assisted interventions, particularly when patients are immunocompromised.

== Emerging pathogen status ==
Recent veterinary publications have identified Encephalitozoon cuniculi as an emerging pathogen of increasing importance to clinical and public health. E. cuniculi has been reported in rabbits for a long time, but the increase in cases reported in both pet and commercial rabbits suggests that the burden of disease is increasing. Individuals believe multiple factors may be contributing to this trend including an increase in diagnostic awareness, the growing number of rabbit owners, and immunosuppression in both animal and human hosts. Moreover, the possibility of E. cuniculi transmission from wild rabbits to domestic animals, including rare transmission to humans, dogs and cats, suggest that a more significant zoonotic role may be established than currently thought. Given this, the recent call by public health researchers, veterinarians and veterinary specialists for extended screening in specific contexts, particularly with immunocompromised patients or during animal-assisted therapy, seem to differ from previous calls for surveillance of this potential zoonotic agent.
