= Ekkehard Wölk =

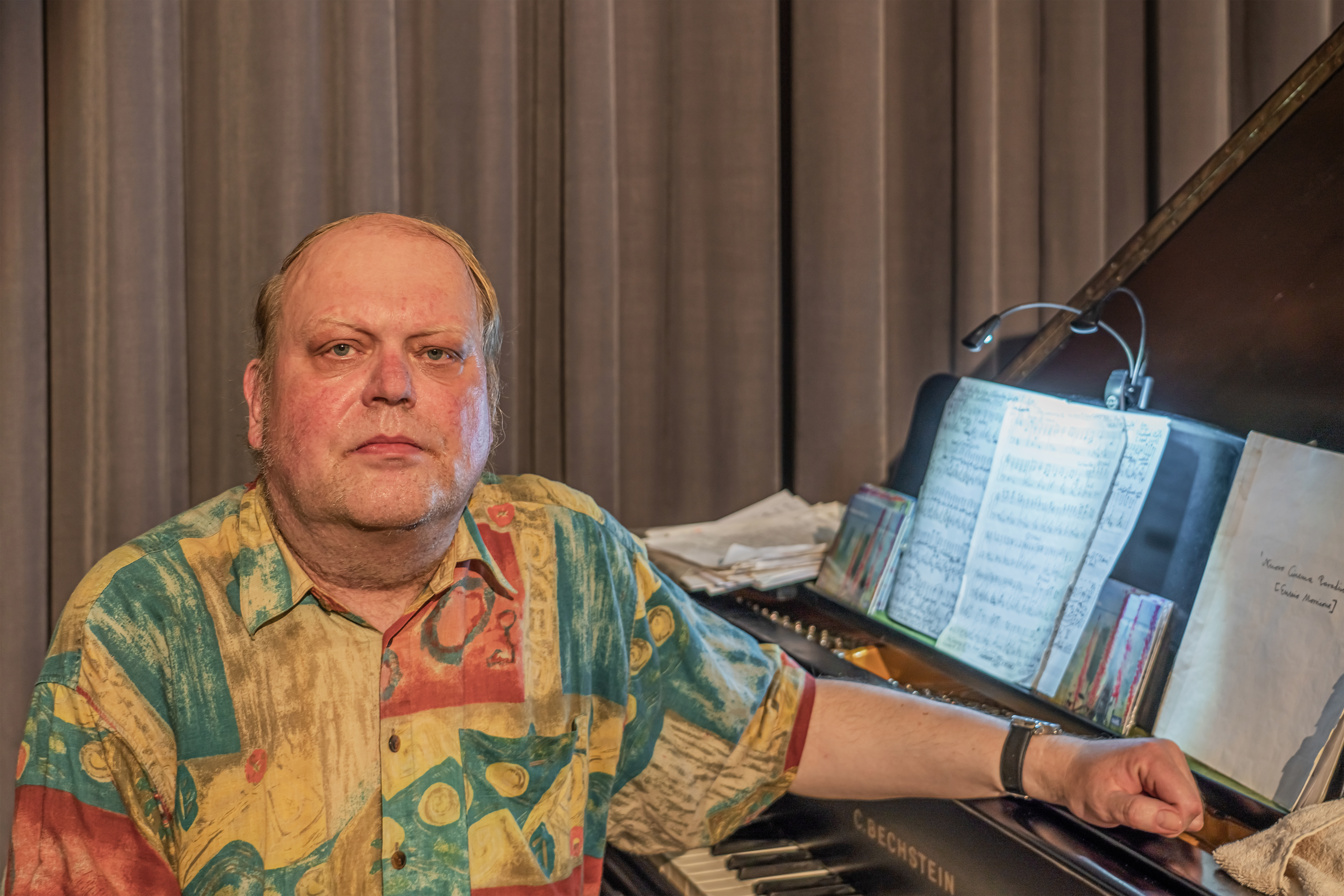
- Ekkehard Wölk in 2023

Background information
- Born: 14 June 1967 (age 59)
- Origin: Schleswig, Germany
- Genres: Jazz, Classic
- Occupations: Pianist; Composer; Arranger
- Instrument: Piano

Ekkehard Wölk is a German pianist, arranger, and composer, working in both classical and jazz idioms.

== Early life ==
He was born in Schleswig, Federal Republic of Germany in 1967. Wölk started piano training at the age of seven. His classical music teachers and professors were Kevin McKenna (Dublin, Ireland), Hartmut Leistritz (conservatory of Lubeck), Eliza Hansen (conservatory of Hamburg), and Gunther Daubler (conservatory of Wurzburg). His jazz improvisation teachers were Walter Norris, Dieter Glawischnig, Richie Beirach, Philip Catherine, John Taylor, Fred Hersch, and Barry Harris.

After graduating from high school in 1987 he studied historical and systematic musicology at the University of Hamburg and later in the mid-1990s at the Humboldt University in Berlin.

From 1988 to 1994 he studied classical piano at the conservatories in Hamburg and Lubeck. 1994 he graduated as a concert pianist and music pedagogue.

In 1995 Wölk moved to Berlin and continued working as a pianist, composer, arranger, bandleader and accompanist mostly in classical and jazz musical genres.

== Silent films ==
A couple of his works for German films have been released on DVD by New York-based company Kino. Secrets of a Soul by G. W. Pabst from 1926 with Werner Krauss was released in 2008 and The Finances of the Grand Duke by Murnau.

With the silent movie music trio Blanc Et Noir he also performed at the Palais Royal Des Beaux Arts in Brussels, accompanying silent short comedies.

In the summer of 2019 Wölk presented his new original quartet composition for the classic German film Madame Dubarry (Ernst Lubitsch, 1919) during the open-air summer festival of UFA Filmnächte in Berlin.

== Recordings ==
He has seven albums released as a bandleader, composer and arranger in Germany and Italy:

- Songs, Chorals and Dances (2005, Nabel Records)
- Reflections on Mozart (2006, Nabel Records)
- Desire for Spring (2007, Splasch Records)
- Homage To Nino Rota (2008, Splasch Records)
- The Berlin Album (2011, Jazzwerkstatt Records): Presents several of Wölk's compositions from his Berlin suite, as well as new arrangements of tunes by Mendelssohn, Weill, Eisler and Holländer.
- Another Kind of Faith (2017, Nabel Records): features Wölk's jazz arrangements of Protestant chorals by Luther, Walter, Schütz and J. S. Bach.
- Pictures in Sounds (2019, Nabel Records): Wölk's latest album (released on CD and LP) with his own ensemble encompasses a collection of his original compositions from the last two decades.

== Compositions ==
Among his most notable works as a composer, there are several large-scale suites for chamber music ensemble in the last ten years, combined with powerful segments of instrumental improvisation. The first of these compositions happened to be the epic six-movement suite Across The Border which was written in the summer of 2000. This piece is an elaborate attempt to catch an imaginary atmosphere and the basic emotional experience of perpetual motion in travelling through a vast, wild and unexplored continent, musically alternating between tightly arranged ensemble parts and vigorously executed jazz-influenced improvisations.

The collection of compositions under the title "Pictures in Sounds" (1999–2019) include numbers inspired by non-musical motifs from literature and visual arts, mostly written for piano trio, saxophone and cello.

In the winter of 2004, Ekkehard Wölk was invited for a composer's residency in Ahrenshoop. During that time he worked on the four-part Berlin suite called "People on Sunday" (Babylon Revisited) for septet including violin, alto sax, trombone and clarinet besides the regular piano trio in which he musically depicts the course of life on a Sunday in contemporary Berlin from sunrise to sunset. The suite is structurally inspired by the silent movie by Robert Siodmak and Billy Wilder, Menschen Am Sonntag (1929).

In June 2004 Wölk was invited for another composer's residency in Toronto, Ontario. While taking part in the Gibraltar Point Artists' Residency, he composed a vast 18-part song cycle called "Book of images" based upon early poems by Rainer Maria Rilke (1875–1926) from his publication The Book of Images.

Some extracts from these suites have been frequently performed by the Ekkehard Wölk Trio in the past years and have also been recorded live by Deutschlandradio Kultur, Radio Berlin- Brandenburg and Bayerischer Rundfunk München.

== Festival appearances ==
His notable festival appearances include the Bachfest Leipzig, the Mozartfest Würzburg where he delivered piano solo renditions of famous classical Mozart songs and arias, the International Jazz Festival in New Delhi, Russia (at the Glinka Hall Philharmonic and the Mariinsky Theatres) in St. Petersburg, and also in various European countries including Norway, Estonia, Czech Republic, Belgium and Italy.
