= Encephalitozoon intestinalis =

Scientific classification
- Kingdom: Fungi
- Phylum: Microsporidia
- Family: Unikaryonidae
- Genus: Encephalitozoon
- Species: E. intestinalis

Binomial name
- Encephalitozoon intestinalis (A.Cali, D.P.Kotler & J.M.Orenstein) anon.

Species of parasitic fungus

Encephalitozoon intestinalis is a parasite. It can cause microsporidiosis.

It is notable as having one of the smallest genome among known eukaryotic organisms, containing only 2.25 million base pairs. Its genome was completely sequenced in 2010.

Encephalitozoon intestinalis originally named Septata intestinalis, was reclassified based on morphologic, antigenic and molecular similarities with other species of the genus Encephalitozoon. Recently, Some domestic and wild animals have been found to be naturally infected with E. intestinalis and some other microsporidian species.

Encephalitozoon intestinalis is transmitted in contaminated water. It causes gastro-intestinal tract infection which subsequently leads to diarrhea and circulates to the ocular, genitourinary and respiratory tracts. Research has proven that E. intestinalis infection can increase host cell nuclear mutation rate.

== Disease ==
Microsporidia are obligate intracellular opportunistic fungi that cause significant pathology in immunocompromised (simply put: having an impaired immune system) hosts. Like other obligate intracellular pathogens, microsporidia exert significant stress on infected host cells. Microsporidia infection alters host cell cycle regulation and can lead to development of multinucleated host cells.

== Genome ==
Compared to E. cuniculi which encodes about 2000 massive genes at 2.9 Mbp, E. intestinalis had a reduced gene complement and genome size (2.3 Mbp) because of a high degree of host dependency. E. intestinalis lack large gene blocks of sequence in its subtelomeric regions unlike E. cuniculi. However, E. intestinalis and E. cuniculi share a conserved gene content, order and density over most of their genomes which have similar GC content. They also contain the same complement of transfer RNAs and ribosomal RNAs.

== Detection ==
The assay is adaptable to the clinical laboratory and represents the first real‐time PCR assay designed to detect Encephalitozoon species. Melting temperature analysis of the amplicons allows for the differentiation of three Encephalitozoon species (E. intestinalis, E. cuniculi, and E.hellem).

== Prevention and treatment ==
Frequent washing of hands and limited exposure to animals is highly recommended especially for people with immune system deficiency. Treatment of Microsporidia can vary depending on the species involved. Intravenous fluid administration, electrolyte repletion, dietary and nutritional regimens can be helpful to patients with diarrhea while antiretroviral therapy can help improve immune system function.
