= Abhishek Nath =

Indian social entrepreneur working in sanitation, founder of LooCafe

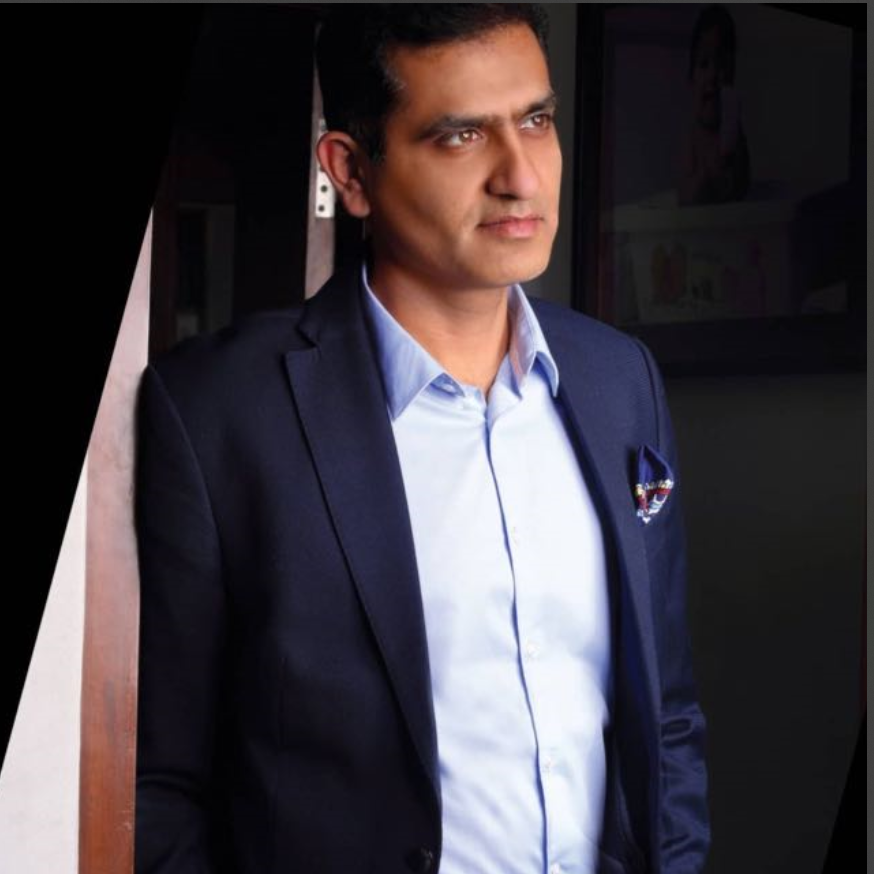
- Nath in 2019
- Born: 12 October 1978 (age 47); Hyderabad, India
- Education: Hotel Management
- Occupations: CEO, LooCafe & Ixora Group
- Known for: Founding LooCafe and working in WASH in India

Abhishek Nath is an Indian businessman, social entrepreneur. He is the founder of LooCafe, an India-based organization focused on WASH (Water, Sanitation, and Hygiene), environmental sanitation, and waste management.

The parent company of LooCafe, Ixora Corporate Services, which Nath also founded, operates in urban sanitation and facility management for public spaces.

Nath serves as the chair of the All India Management Association's Young Leaders Council. He has collaborated with the Swachh Bharat Mission and leads a private company involved in Swachh Survekshan initiatives.

== Movement for sanitation and hygiene ==
After leaving his roles at Johnson Controls and Taj Hotels, Abhishek Nath began working in urban sanitation. He founded Ixora Corporate Services (ICS), a facility management company, and became involved in the Swachh Bharat Mission for urban sanitation work with heritage sites, such as the Charminar.

He first noticed the failing structures of brick and mortar Public toilets and their pay to use system, which did not work out due to operations costs and high philanthropic investment needs.

Then established LooCafe where he created a structure of a public toilet that was prefabricated, free for toilet use, attached to a Point of sale (café) built inside a shipping container. The model also supports social change, as it helps urbanization of street hawkers into established businesses and creates employment directly through its structure.

After founding LooCafe in 2018 in Hyderabad, he has worked on expanding their operations into sanitation technology, waste management, and building circular economy models.

In 2025, Nath launched ReFlow Toilets, a sanitation infrastructure initiative focused on district-level deployments that promotes Bio-Circular Resource Technology (B-CRT).

Currently, the company counts 400 such structures across India. With operations set up in Hyderabad, Srinagar, Bengaluru, Chandigarh, Mumbai, Chennai, Patna, Pune, Indore, Mohali.

== Recognition ==
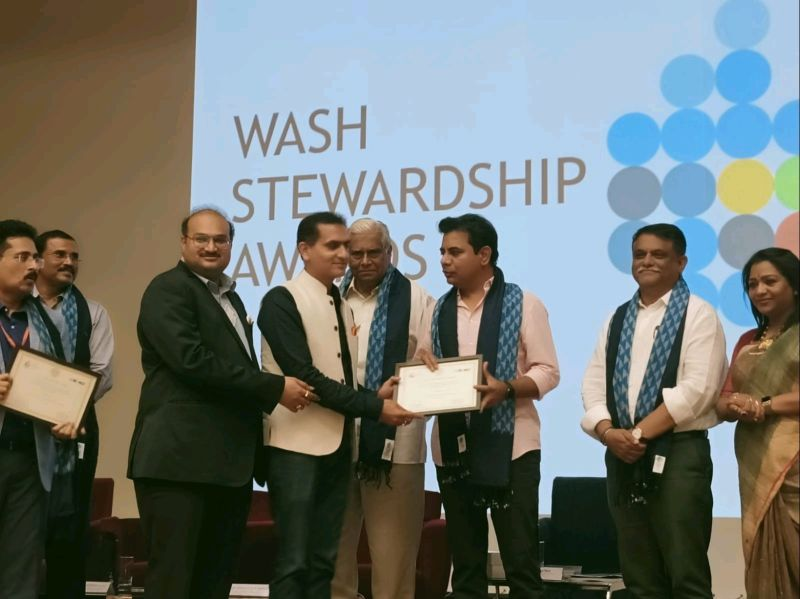
Abhishek Nath receiving the WASH Stewardship Award by K. T. Rama Rao former Minister of MA&UD, IT&EC

In 2016, he won Cleaning leader of the Year award by Clean and Green India. In 2019, he won Confederation of Indian Industry awards. In 2020, his work was featured by the United Nations Development Programme (UNDP) as a best practice In the 2022 edition of InkWASH, he was awarded with the WASH Stewardship Award, In the 2023 edition, he was a featured speaker. His work was also a featured Innovation in the WASH book of Innovations. His work has been claimed to have brought about reforms in the Public toilet and sanitation space using sustainability and technology. Currently, LooCafe's are India's most widespread public toilet models.

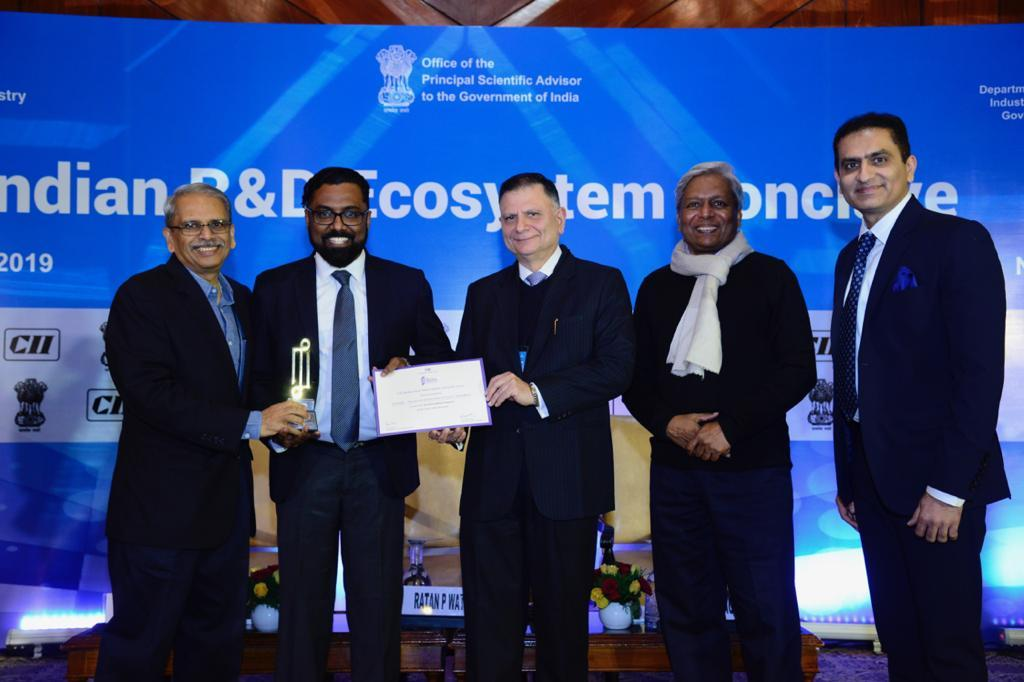
LooCafé — Ixora corporate services has been selected as the most Innovative company in services category Nationally — CII

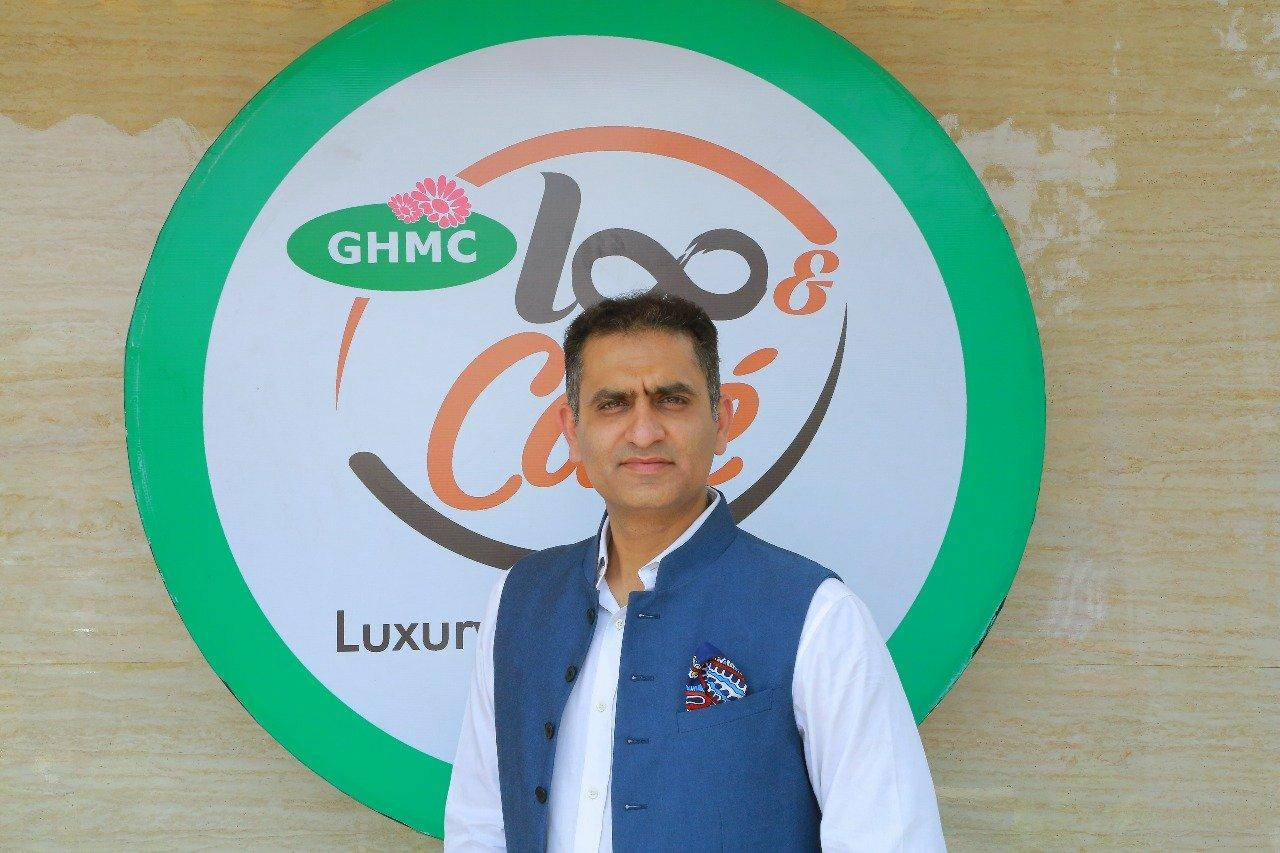
Abhishek Nath, founder of LooCafe, standing in front of the LooCafe logo
