= List of cleanest railway stations in India =

Swachh Rail, Swachh Bharat
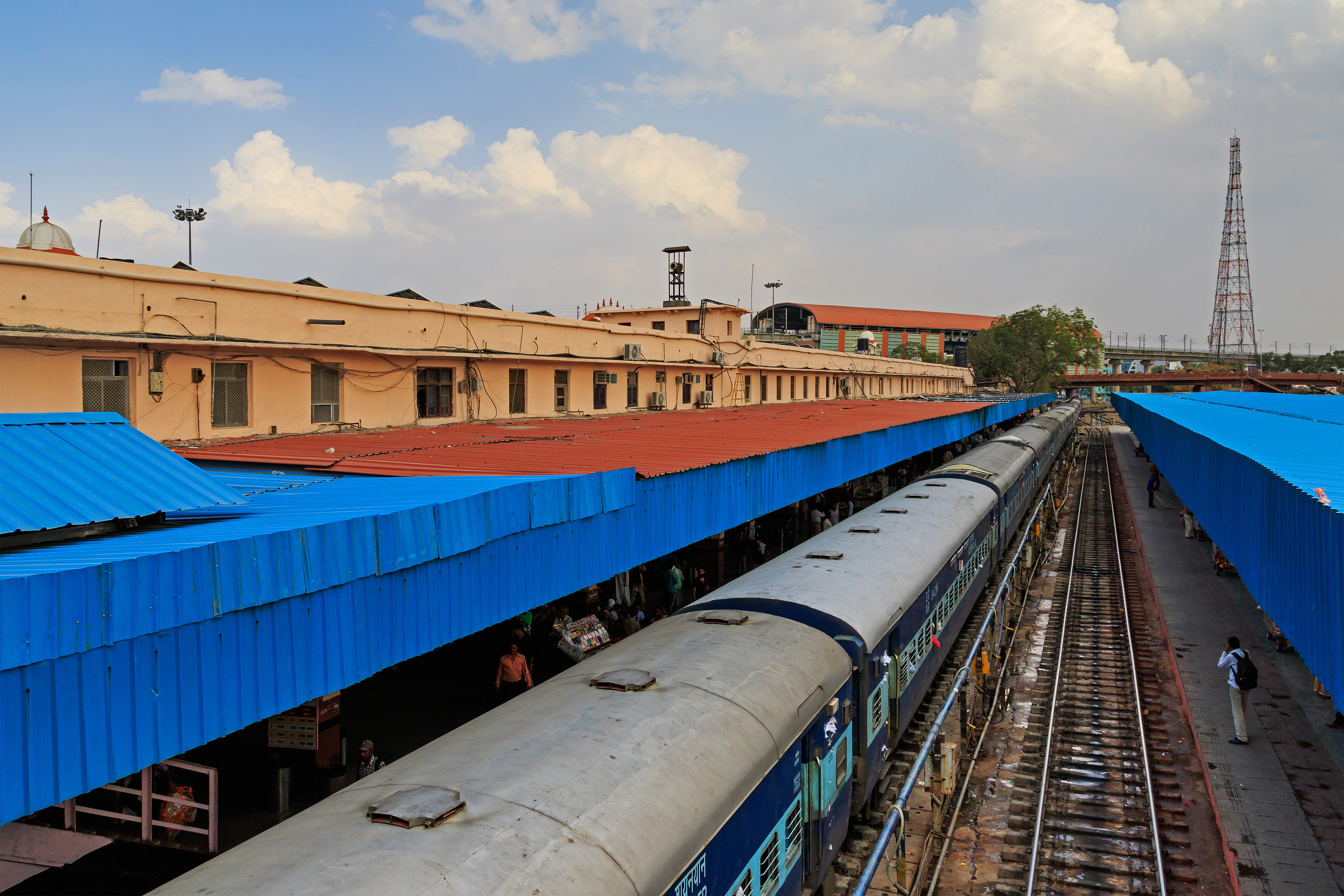
- Jaipur Railway Station

Top Cleanest Railway Station
- NSG Category: Jaipur
- SG Category: Andheri

Indian Railways
- Board: Ministry of Railways
- Programme: Swachh Rail, Swachh Bharat
- Country: India

The Ministry of Railways launched "Swachh Rail, Swachh Bharat" campaign in 2015 to improve cleanliness standards of trains, stations and experience for Indian passengers. The campaign was introduced in 2015-2016 Railway Budget. The survey is conducted across 720 major railway stations including NSG Category and SG Category stations for cleanliness ranking.

The survey is commissioned by the Environment & Housekeeping Management Directorate - Railway Board, Ministry of Railways. The survey is conducted by Indian Railway Catering and Tourism Corporation.

== Swachh Rail Swachh Bharat Report 2016 ==
The following are the top 10 cleanest railway stations in India:

State	Station	Rank
Punjab	Beas	1
Gujarat	Gandhidham	2
Goa	Vasco-Da-Gama	3
Gujarat	Jamnagar	4
Tamilnadu	Kumbakonam	5
Gujarat	Surat	6
Maharashtra	Nasik Road	7
Gujarat	Rajkot	8
Tamilnadu	Salem	9
Gujarat	Ankleshwar	10

== Swachh Rail Swachh Bharat Report 2017 ==
=== A1-Category Wise ===
The following are the top 10 cleanest A1-Category railway stations in India:

State	Station	Rank
Andhra Pradesh	Visakhapatnam	1
Telangana	Secunderabad	2
Jammu and Kashmir	Jammu Tawi	3
Andhra Pradesh	Vijayawada	4
Delhi	Anand Vihar Terminal	5
Uttar Pradesh	Lucknow	6
Gujarat	Ahmedabad	7
Rajasthan	Jaipur	8
Maharashtra	Pune	9
Karnataka	Bangalore City	10

=== A-Category Wise ===
The following are the top 10 cleanest A-Category railway stations in India:

State	Station	Rank
Punjab	Beas	1
Telangana	Khammam	2
Madhya Pradesh	Indore	3
West Bengal	Durgapur	4
Telangana	Mancherial	5
Maharashtra	Badnera	6
Assam	Rangiya	7
Telangana	Warangal	8
Madhya Pradesh	Damoh	9
Gujarat	Bhuj	10

== Swachh Rail Swachh Bharat Report 2018 ==
=== A1-Category Wise ===
The following are the top 10 cleanest A1-Category railway stations in India:

State	Station	Rank
Rajasthan	Jodhpur	1
Rajasthan	Jaipur	2
Andhra Pradesh	Tirupati	3
Andhra Pradesh	Vijayawada	4
Delhi	Anand Vihar Terminal	5
Telangana	Secunderabad	6
Maharashtra	Bandra	7
Telangana	Hyderabad	8
Odisha	Bhubaneswar	9
Andhra Pradesh	Visakhapatnam	10

=== A-Category Wise ===
The following are the top 10 cleanest A-Category railway stations in India:

State	Station	Rank
Rajasthan	Marwar	1
Rajasthan	Phulera	2
Telangana	Warangal	3
Rajasthan	Udaipur	4
Rajasthan	Jaisalmer	5
Telangana	Nizamabad	6
Rajasthan	Barmer	7
Telangana	Mancherial	8
Karnataka	Mysore	9
Rajasthan	Bhilwara	10

== Swachh Rail Swachh Bharat Report 2019 ==
=== NSG-Category Wise ===
The following are the top 10 cleanest NSG-Category railway stations in India:

State	Station	Rank
Rajasthan	Jaipur	1
Rajasthan	Jodhpur	2
Rajasthan	Durgapura	3
Jammu and Kashmir	Jammu Tawi	4
Rajasthan	Gandhinagar Jaipur	5
Rajasthan	Suratgarh	6
Andhra Pradesh	Vijayawada	7
Rajasthan	Udaipur	8
Rajasthan	Ajmer	9
Kerala	Kannur	10

=== SG-Category Wise ===
The following are the top 10 cleanest SG-Category railway stations in India:

State	Station	Rank
Maharashtra	Andheri	1
Maharashtra	Virar	2
Maharashtra	Naigaon	3
Maharashtra	Kandivali	4
West Bengal	Santragachi	5
Maharashtra	Currey Road	6
Maharashtra	Dombivali	7
Maharashtra	King's Circle	8
Maharashtra	Borivali	9
Maharashtra	Santacruz	10

== See also ==
- Swachh Bharat Mission
- List of cleanest cities in India
