= Swachh Bharat Mission =

Indian campaign to eliminate open defecation

Swachh Bharat Abhiyan

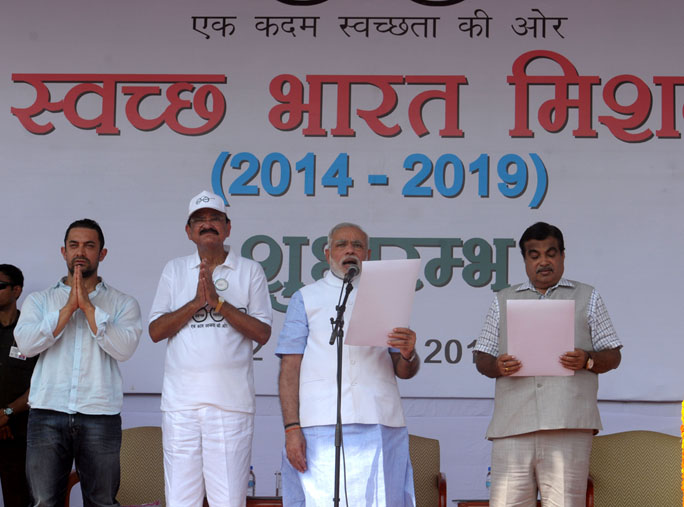
- Narendra Modi speaking at the launch of the Swachh Bharat Mission
- Slogan: One step towards cleanliness
- Country: India
- Key people: Parameswaran Iyer, Narendra Modi (Prime Minister)
- Launched: 2 October 2014; 12 years ago
- Status: Phase 1 completed, Phase 2 launched
- Website: swachhbharatmission.ddws.gov.in

Swachh Bharat Mission (SBM), Swachh Bharat Abhiyan or Clean India Mission is a country-wide campaign initiated by the Government of India on 2 October 2014 to eliminate open defecation and improve solid waste management and to create Open Defecation Free (ODF) villages. The mission also emphasizes scientific solid waste management, including segregation, collection, processing, and disposal of municipal waste. The program also aims to increase awareness of menstrual health management. It is a restructured version of the Nirmal Bharat Abhiyan which was launched by the Government of India in 1999, as Total Sanitation Campaign.

A formal sanitation programme was first launched in India in 1954, followed by the Central Rural Sanitation Programme in 1986, the Total Sanitation Campaign (TSC) in 1999 and the Nirmal Bharat Abhiyan in 2012. These earlier programs laid the foundation for integrated sanitation and waste management approaches, which were further expanded under the Swachh Bharat Mission. Phase 1 of the Swachh Bharat Mission (SBM) lasted until 2 October 2019, and Phase 2 is being implemented between 2020–21 and 2024–25 to reinforce the achievements of Phase 1.

Initiated by the Government of India, the mission aimed to achieve an "open-defecation free" (ODF) India by 2 October 2019, the 150th anniversary of the birth of Mahatma Gandhi through construction of toilets. According to government data, approximately 90 million toilets were constructed during this period. The objectives of the first phase of the mission also included eradication of manual scavenging, generating awareness and bringing about a behaviour change regarding sanitation practices, and augmentation of capacity at the local level.

The second phase of the mission aims to sustain the open defecation-free status and improve the management of solid and liquid waste, while also working to improve the lives of sanitation workers. The mission is aimed at progressing towards target 6.2 of the Sustainable Development Goals Number 6 established by the United Nations in 2015. By achieving the lowest open defecation-free status in 2019, India achieved its Sustainable Development Goal (SDG) 6.2 health target in record time, eleven years ahead of the UN SDG target of 31 December 2030.

The campaign's official name is in Hindi. In English, it translates to "Clean India Mission". The campaign was officially launched on 2 October 2014 at Rajghat, New Delhi by the Prime Minister of India Narendra Modi. It is India's largest cleanliness mission to date, with three million government employees, students and citizens from all parts of India participating in 4,043 cities, towns, and rural communities. At a rally in Champaran, the Prime Minister of India, Narendra Modi, called the campaign Satyagrah se Swachhagrah in reference to Gandhi's Champaran Satyagraha launched on 10 April 1916.

The mission was split into two: rural and urban. In rural areas "SBM - Gramin" was financed and monitored through the Ministry of Drinking Water and Sanitation (since converted to the Department of Drinking Water and Sanitation under the Ministry of Jal Shakti) whereas "SBM - urban" was overseen by the Ministry of Housing and Urban Affairs. The rural division has a five-tier mechanism: central, state, district, block panchayat, and gram panchayat.

The government provided a subsidy for the construction of nearly 90 million toilets between 2014 and 2019, although some Indians, especially in rural areas, choose not to use them. The campaign was criticised for using coercive approaches to force people to use toilets. Some people were stopped from defecating in open and threatened with withdrawal from government benefits. The campaign was financed by the Government of India and state governments. The former released $5.8 billion (Rs 40,700 crore) of funds for toilet construction in 700,000 villages. The total budget for the rural and urban components was estimated at $28 billion, of which 93 per cent was for construction, with the rest being allocated for behaviour change campaigns and administration.

In 2022, approximately 157 million people in India, representing about 11% of the total population, were practising open defecation. This figure included 17% of the rural population (about 154 million) and 0.5% of the urban population (approximately 2.8 million). In comparison, in 2000, around 776 million people, or 73% of the total population, practiced open defecation, including 91% of the rural population (around 701 million) and 25.8% of the urban population (around 75 million), the WHO/UNICEF Joint Monitoring Programme (JMP) reported. Although there has been significant progress, India still has the largest number of people practising open defecation, followed by Nigeria and Ethiopia.

== Background ==
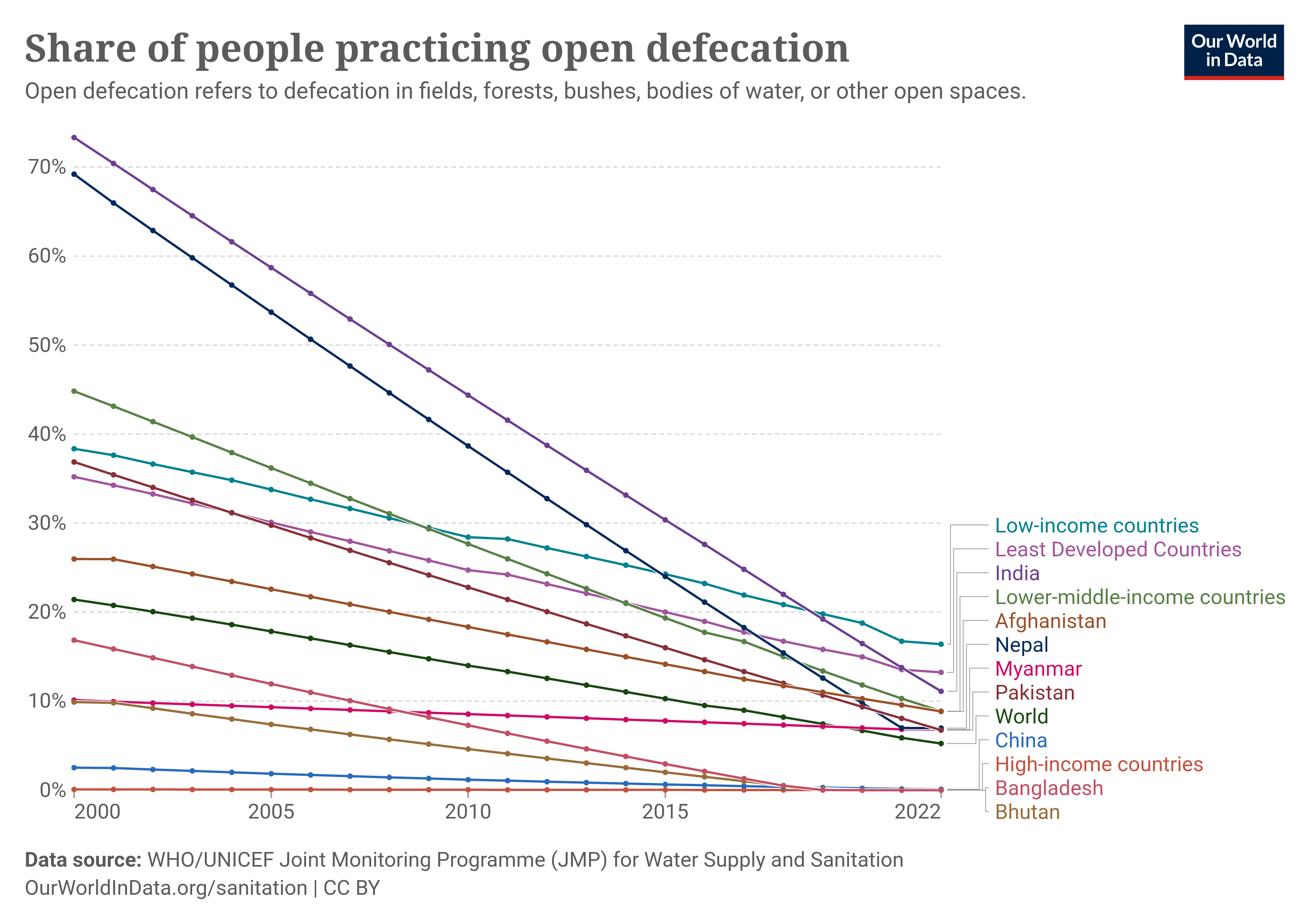
This chart depicts the decrease in open defecation from 2000 to 2022 in countries sharing a land border with India, alongside World Bank income classifications. According to the WHO/UNICEF Joint Monitoring Programme (JMP), as reported by Our World in Data, the number of people practising open defecation fell from 62% to 33% from 2004 - 2014. About 157 million (15.7 crore), or approximately 11% of India's population, still practised open defecation in 2022.

In 2011, the Census revealed that sanitation coverage, as measured by the number of households owning toilets was just 34 per cent in rural India. An estimated 600 million people defecate in the open, the highest of any country in the world. Coverage about open defecation and contamination of drinking and bathing water in India prompted the government to take measures to deal with the problem.

=== Previous sanitation campaigns ===
Since India's independence in 1947, there have been three rural sanitation intervention attempts before the Swachh Bharat Mission: the Central Rural Sanitation Programme, the Total Sanitation Campaign, and the Nirmal Bharat Abhiyan. The first formal sanitation programme was first launched in 1954 as an extension of the First Five Year Plan of the Government of India. In 1982, National sanitation coverage was just 2%. This was followed by the launch of the Central Rural Sanitation Programme (CRSP) in 1986. These were directed towards the construction of toilets; no behavioural change campaign was carried out, and this supply-based approach did not result in broader social transformation. The CRSP aimed to improve the quality of life for rural people and emphasized helping rural women with privacy and dignity. Sanitation increased marginally by 9%. These were construction-led and achieved very little. The Total Sanitation Campaign (TSC) was started in 1999. The TSC focused on increasing awareness around rural sanitation and informed rural populations about sanitation options specific to their living conditions. The Nirmal Bharat Abhiyan (extension of TSC) was enacted in 2009 to generate demand for sanitation, linked to subsidy payments for the construction of toilets by families living below the poverty line. The program focused on community-led strategies and helped households, village schools, and community centres. TSC and Nirmal Bharat Yojana used the Panchayati Raj institutions for social mobilization. Nirmal Bharat Abhiyan was launched in 2012.

A limited randomized study of eighty villages in rural Madhya Pradesh showed that the TSC programme did modestly increase the number of households with latrines, and had a small effect in reducing open defecation. Of the 138.2 million rural households in India (a 2001 figure), nearly 3.5 million constructed toilets. However, there was no improvement in the health of children." The earlier "Nirmal Bharat Abhiyan" rural sanitation program was hampered by the unrealistic approach. Lack of strong political will, lack of political leadership and lack of a behaviour change approach among the people also contributed to the failure of the projects. Consequently, Nirmal Bharat Abhiyan was restructured by Cabinet approval on 24 September 2014 as Swachh Bharat Abhiyan.

The rural household toilet coverage in India increased from 1% in 1981 to 11% in 1991, to 22% in 2001, to 32.7% in 2011. On 15 August 2014, Prime Minister Narendra Modi from the Red Fort in Delhi called on the public to pay tribute to Mahatma Gandhi on his 150th birth anniversary by devoting to a clean India. Narendra Modi was the first Prime Minister to take up the Clean India Movement on a massive scale. Before the launch of Swachh India, 38.4% of rural households had toilets in 2013–14, 43.8% in 2014–15, 51.6% in 2015–16, 65.4% in 2016–17, 84.3% in 2017–18, 98.5% in 2018–19, and 98.5% in 2019–20. 100% toilet facilities are constructed.

Sources: Dashboard of SBM (Gramin), Ministry of Jal Shakti; PRS.

SBM budget (2014–2022) vertical bar chart of between 14-15 and 21-22
Funds earmarked for Swachh Bharat (Gramin) Scheme, written reply by Shri Prahalad Singh Patel, Minister of State for Jal Shakti in Rajya Sabha on 06 February 2023

The National Annual Rural Sanitation Survey of India reported that 96.5% of rural households in India had toilets. in a 2019–2020 report, the number was reduced to 1.4% or 19 million. Since 2014, the Government of India, has made remarkable strides in reaching the Open Defecation Free targets. 36 states and union territories, 706 districts and over 603,175 villages have been declared open defecation-free as of January 2020.

Where it achieved a measure of success, SBM built on the earlier sanitation programmes. It refined its approaches and templatised the action plan for districts. From the early 2010s, several district collectors and magistrates from West Bengal to Rajasthan experimented with different methods to engage local people and panchayats in community mobilisation. They selected swachhagrahis, trained them and released them for campaigns on a schedule. They were paid from sanitation funds. In states with strong panchayats, these measures bore fruit and the gains of sanitation, that is, toilet construction, were backed by usage. In other states, little was achieved beyond toilet construction.

Statistics
Sl.No.	State/UT	No. of IHHLs constructed
1	Andaman & Nicobar Islands	22,378
2	Andhra Pradesh	42,71,773
3	Arunachal Pradesh	1,44,608
4	Assam	40,05,740
5	Bihar	1,21,26,567
6	Chhattisgarh	33,78,655
7	Dadra & Nagar Haveli and Daman & Diu	21,906
8	Goa	28,637
9	Gujarat	41,89,006
10	Haryana	6,89,186
11	Himachal Pradesh	1,91,546
12	Jammu & Kashmir	12,61,757
13	Jharkhand	41,29,545
14	Karnataka	46,31,316
15	Kerala	2,39,360
16	Ladakh	17,241
17	Madhya Pradesh	71,93,976
18	Maharashtra	67,93,541
19	Manipur	2,68,348
20	Meghalaya	2,64,828
21	Mizoram	44,141
22	Nagaland	1,41,246
23	Odisha	70,79,564
24	Puducherry	29,628
25	Punjab	5,11,223
26	Rajasthan	81,20,658
27	Sikkim	11,209
28	Tamil Nadu	55,11,791
29	Telangana	31,01,859
30	Tripura	4,40,514
31	Uttar Pradesh	2,22,10,649
32	Uttarakhand	5,24,076
33	West Bengal	74,49,451
	Total	10,90,45,923

IHHL = Individual Household Latrine. Every toilet in every village is mapped in the Integrated Management Information System (IMIS) for real-time progress reporting. Every toilet is mandatorily geotagged to ensure transparency in the entire process.

== Promotional campaigns ==
=== Selected public figures and brand ambassadors ===
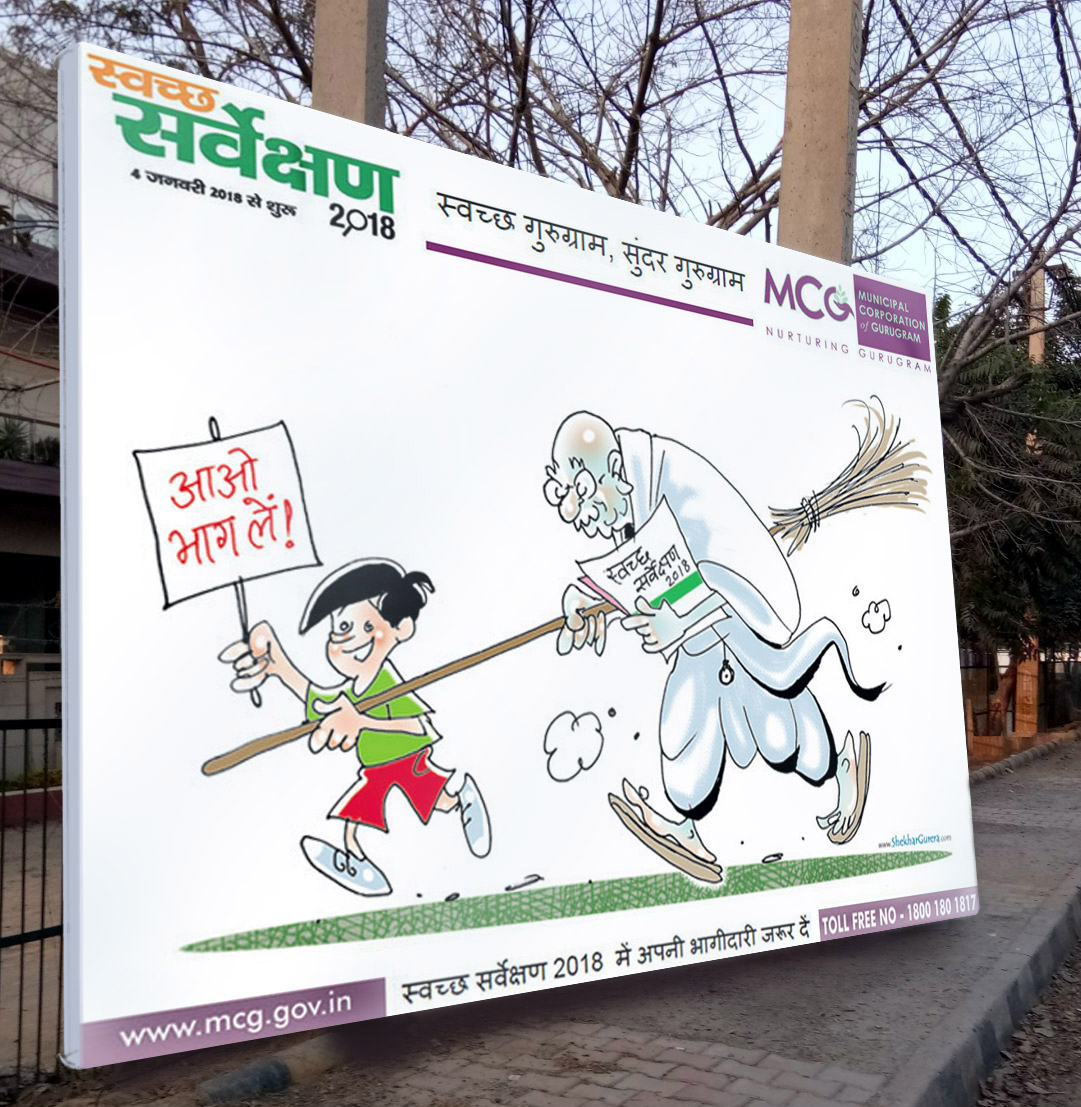
One of the posters from cartoon based campaign by MCG drawn by the cartoonist Shekhar Gurera

More than three million government employees, 12 crore school and college students, 6.25 lakh volunteers, 2.5 lakh panchayat leaders, lakhs of public and 50 celebrities are participating in this movement.

The Prime Minister himself has been the chief communicator of this scheme. He wrote a letter to all 250,000 village presidents all over the country and encouraged them to reach out to people in their villages for sanitation services.

The rural division of the program is a top-down campaign. Initially, the program was supposed to educate rural people about hygiene and encourage them to make better sanitation choices. High-profile performances by celebrities and politicians sweeping the streets to promote Clean India ignored the serious, unclean work required to maintain the program's latrines (such as manhole cleaning). The high-profile celebrities associated with the campaign did little to encourage sanitary practices among rural people.

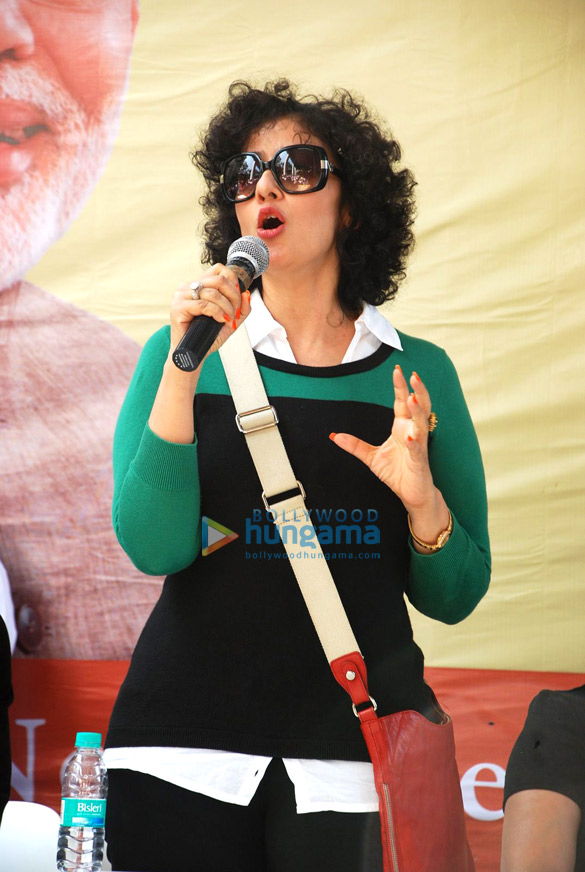
Manisha Koirala at Swachh Bharat Abhiyan in November 2014

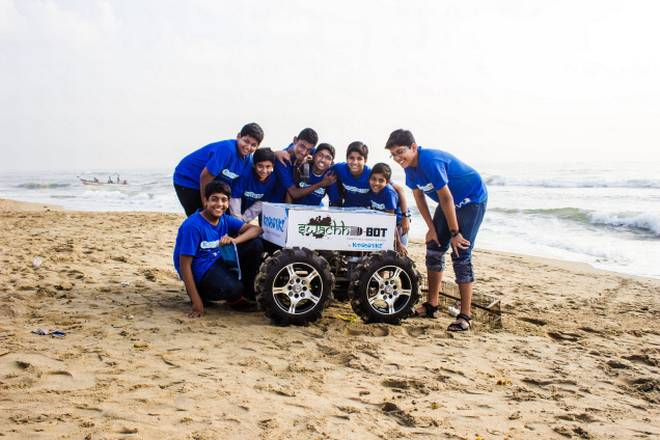
Beach cleaning robot Swachh Bot, made by a maker community in Chennai

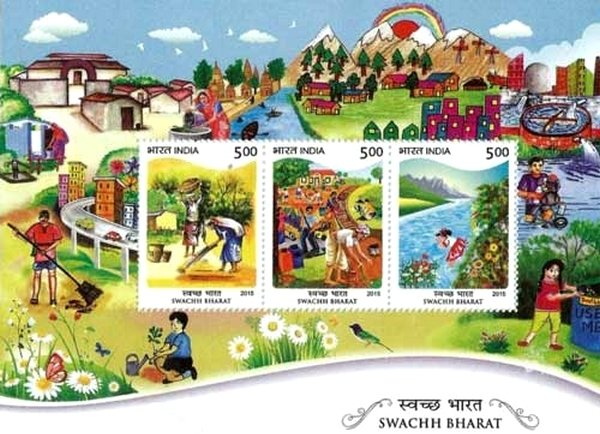
The Department of Post issued a set of three Commemorative Postage Stamps on the theme of Swachh Bharat.

Brand ambassadors nominated from 2014 to 2018
Early 2014	Late 2014	2015	2017 and 2018
Prime Minister Modi selected the following public figures to propagate this campaign: Sachin Tendulkar (cricketer); Priyanka Chopra (actress and singer); Baba Ramdev (yoga guru); Salman Khan (actor); Vidya Balan (actress); Shashi Tharoor (politician, diplomat, author); Team: Taarak Mehta Ka Ooltah Chashmah; Amitabh Bachchan (actor); Mridula Sinha (politician); Kamal Hasan (actor); Virat Kohli (cricketer); Mahendra Singh Dhoni (cricketer)	Brand ambassadors nominated by Prime Minister Modi on 2 October 2014: Sourav Ganguly (cricketer); Kiran Bedi (police officer); Padmanabha Acharya (civil servant); Sonal Mansingh (classical dancer); Ramoji Rao (Eenadu group); Aroon Purie (India Today group); On 8 November 2014, Prime Minister carried the message to Uttar Pradesh and nominated another set of nine people for that state.: Akhilesh Yadav (politician); Swami Rambhadracharya; Manoj Tiwari (politician); Dilkeshvar Kumar (engineer); Mohammad Kaif (cricketer); Deviprasad Dwivedi (teacher); Raju Srivastava (comedian); Suresh Raina (cricketer); Kailash Kher (music composer)	On 5 January 2015, the minister in-charge nominated followed Telugu icons as brand ambassadors.: Rajyogini Dadi Janki; Pawan Kalyan (actor turned politician); S. P. Balasubrahmanyam; Amala Akkineni; Narendra Choudary Tummala; K. Kavitha; G V K Reddy; Suddala Ashok Teja; P Gopichand (badminton player); Humpy Koneru; Galla Jayadev; Nithin; V. V. S. Laxman (cricketer); J. Rameshwar Rao; Shivlal Yadav; B. V. R. Mohan Reddy; Akshay Kumar (actor and producer ); Lakshmi Manchu	From later dates, the following public icons & celebrities were nominated as National Brand Ambassadors by Prime Minister Modi to join and support the Swachh Bharat Mission: Shilpa Shetty (actress), from February 2017; Raveena Tandon (actress), from February 2017; Sanjay Dutt (actor), from 2018; Juhi Chawla (actress), from 2018; Shekhar Gurera (cartoonist), from January 2018; Shahrukh Khan (actor), from 2018; D. P. Sharma (social activist), from September 2017

=== Other notable activities ===
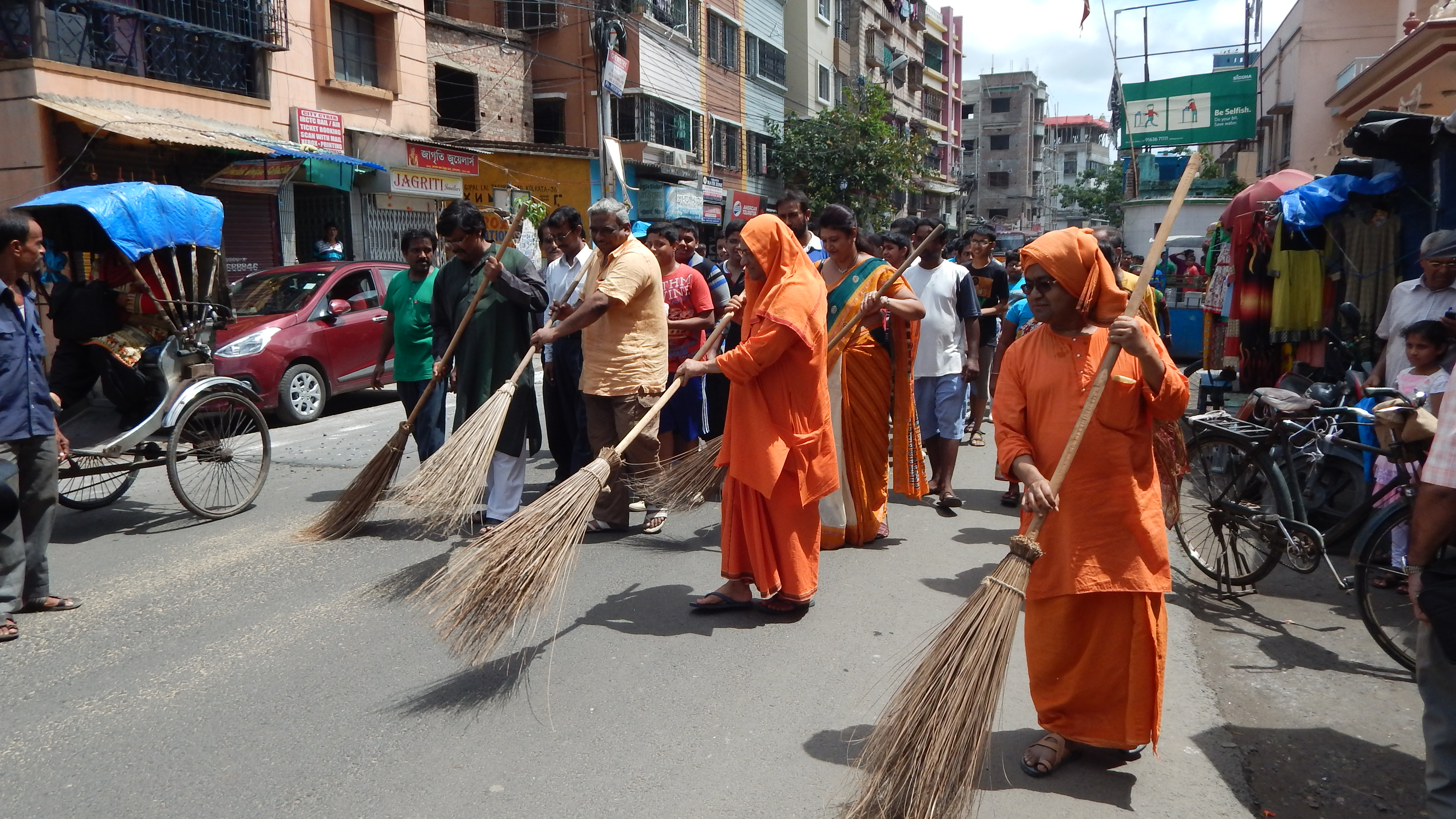
Swachh Bharat Abhiyan by Baranagore Ramakrishna Mission Ashrama High School in Baranagar, 2016

- In the Kabirdham district of Chhattisgarh, around 1.38 lakh children belonging to 1700 schools wrote to their parents to build toilets in their homes. The impact and initiative of the children have inspired this district to become an ODF district in a very short time.
- In a single night in 2017, more than 5 crore schoolchildren created sketches and essays on cleanliness.
- Anushka Sharma and the Vice President of India M V Naidu picked up a broom to help clean the cyclone-hit port city of Visakhapatnam, in the southern state of Andhra Pradesh, as part of the cleanliness campaign.
- Prime Minister Modi nominated several organizations in October 2014 to be "brand ambassadors", including the Institute of Chartered Accountants of India, Eenadu and India Today as well as the dabbawala of Mumbai, who deliver home-made food to hundreds of thousands of people in the city. More than 3 million government employees and school and college students participated in the drive on the occasion.
- A Swachh Bharat Run, attended by 1,500 runners, was organized at the Rashtrapati Bhavan on 2 October 2014.
- Kunwar Bai Yadav lived in a village in Dhamtari district and sold seven of her goats to raise the money to build a toilet at her house at age 106 in 2016. She was declared a mascot of the campaign and visited by Prime Minister Narendra Modi.
- Inspired by the Clean India Mission, a robot named Swachh Bot was built by a maker community in Chennai to clean the waste on Besant Nagar beach.
- More than 10 lakh toilets in India have been decorated with Clean India Project messages as part of Ministry of Water and Sanitation's (MoDW&S) 'Clean Beautiful Toilet Contest'.

=== Planned initiatives ===
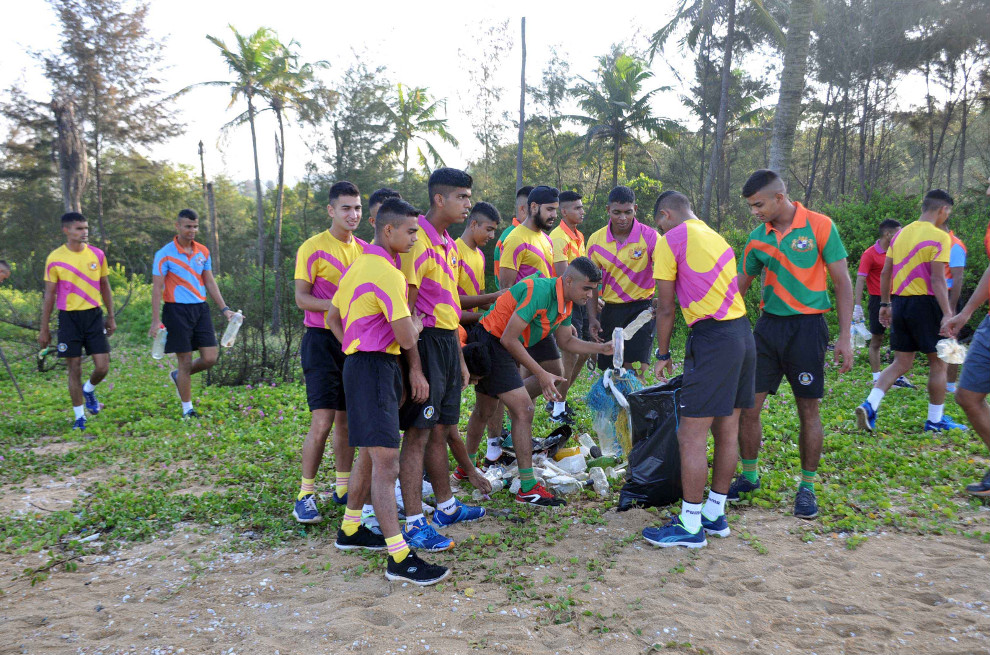
Indian Naval Academy cadets taking part in Swachh Bharat Mission, 2016

The Government appointed CPWD with the responsibility to dispose of waste from Government offices. The Ministry of Railways planned to have the facility of cleaning on demand, clean bed-rolls from automatic laundries, bio-toilets, dustbins in all non-AC coaches. The Swachh Bharat, Swachh Vidyalaya campaign was launched by the Minister of Human Resource Development, Government of India by participating in the cleanliness drive along with the school's teachers and students.

Separate toilet facilities for male and female students have been established in schools under the 'Swachh Bharat, Swachh Vidyalaya' scheme.

== Structure ==
=== Components ===
The core objectives of the first phase of the mission were to reduce open defecation and improve management of municipal solid waste in both urban and rural areas. Elimination of open defecation was to be achieved through construction of individual household level toilets (often twin pit pour flush pit latrines), toilets and public toilets. For improving solid waste management, cities were encouraged to segregate waste at source into wet, dry, and hazardous categories to improve recycling efficiency and reduce landfill burden. Urban Local Bodies (ULBs) are responsible for implementation at the city level, including door-to-door collection, segregation, transportation, and processing of municipal solid waste. and prepare detailed project reports that are bankable and have a financial model. The goal was to assume a "community-led total sanitation" approach to educate people; critics point out, however, that in the actual implementation, organizers used shaming tactics (to dissuade people from openly defecating) instead of providing respectful education.

The second phase, on the other hand, focuses on sustaining the gains of the first phase and improving management of the solid and liquid wastes.

As part of the campaign, volunteers, known as Swachhagrahis, or "Ambassadors of cleanliness", promoted the construction of toilets using a popular method called Community-Led Total Sanitation at the village level. Other activities included national real-time monitoring and updates from non-governmental organizations such as Feedback Foundation Charitable Trust, The Ugly Indian, Waste Warriors, and SWACH Pune (Solid Waste Collection and Handling).

=== Finance ===
SBM was budgeted at $28 billion. The government provides an incentive of ₹12,000 (US$120) for each toilet constructed by a rural family. An amount of ₹90 billion (US$930 million) was allocated for the mission in the 2016 Union budget of India. The World Bank provided a US$1.5 billion loan and $25 million in technical assistance in 2015 for the Swachh Bharat Mission to support India's universal sanitation initiation. This was to be released in installments subject to checks by an independent verification agency but till January 2017, no funds has been disbursed. The programme has also received funds and technical support from several international organizations and private companies as part of corporate social responsibility initiatives, and the Sarva Shiksha Abhiyan and Rashtriya Madhyamik Shiksha Abhiyan schemes.

== Performance monitoring ==
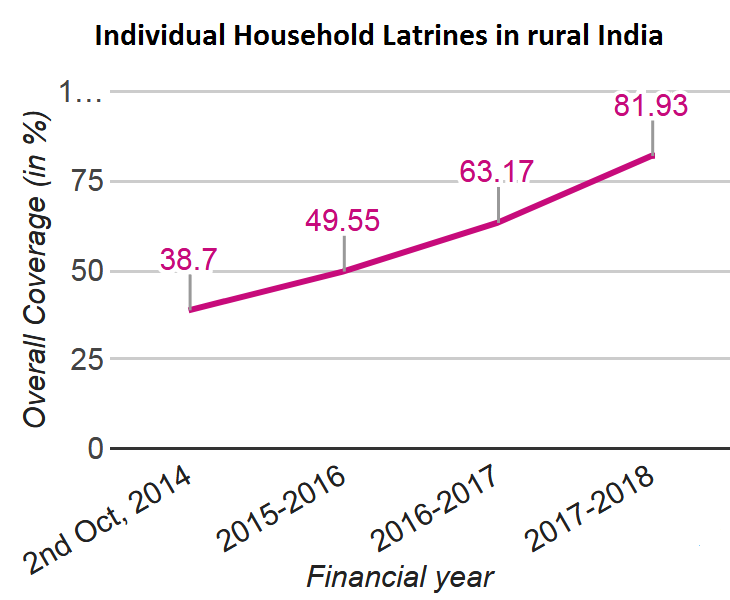
Individual household latrines coverage in rural India

Swachh Bharat Mission (SBM) Mobile app is being used by people and Government organisations to achieve the goals of Swachh Bharat Mission. For this the government of India is bringing awareness to the people through advertisements.

In 2017, the national sanitation coverage rose to 65% from 38.7% on 2 October 2014, before the start of the campaign. It was 90% in August 2018. 35 states/Union Territories, 699 districts and 5.99 lakh (599,000) villages were declared Open Defecation Free (ODF) by 25 September 2019.

The cities and towns which have been declared ODF stood at 22 per cent and the urban wards which have achieved 100 per cent door-to-door solid waste collection stood at 50 per cent. The number of Swachhagrahi volunteers working across urban local bodies rose to 20,000, and those working in rural India rose to more than 100,000. The number of schools with separate toilet facilities for girls rose from 0.4 million (37 per cent) to almost one million (91 per cent).

=== Swachh Survekshan annual cleanliness survey ===
Swachh Survekshan, commissioned by Ministry of Urban Development and carried out by Quality Council of India, is an extensive sanitation survey across several hundred cities to check the progress and impact of Swachh Bharat Abhiyan and to foster a spirit of competition among the cities. The performance of each city is evaluated on six parameters:

- Municipal solid waste, sweeping, collection and transportation
- Municipal solid waste, processing, and disposal of solid waste
- Open defecation free and toilets
- Capacity building and eLearning
- Provision of public toilets and community toilets
- Information, education and communication, and behavior change

== Impacts ==
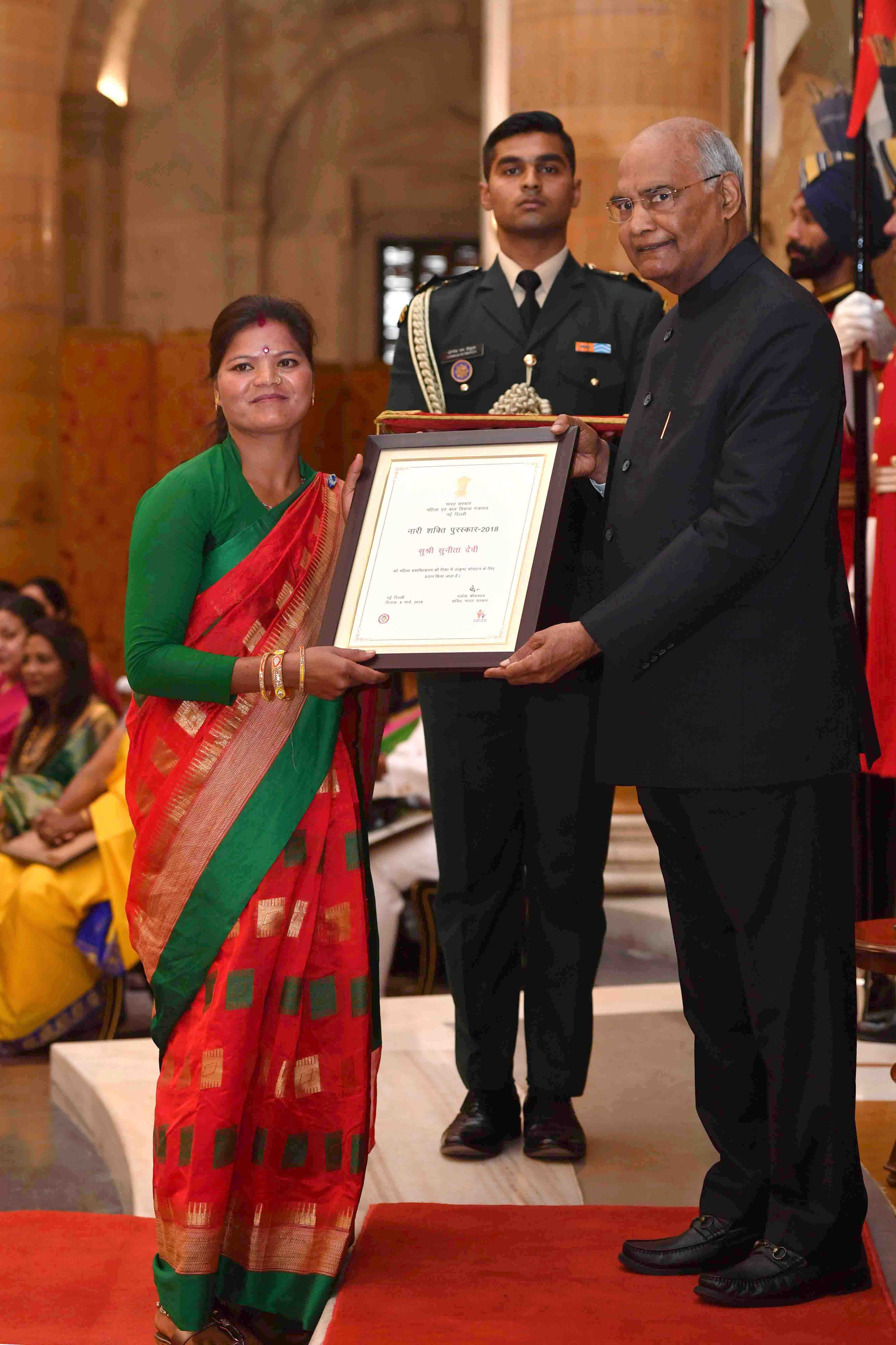
Sunita Devi, who was inspired by the campaign, won the Nari Shakti Puraskar award in 2019 for constructing toilets in her village in Jharkhand.

According to the dashboards maintained by respective ministries, more than 100 million individual household-level toilets have been constructed in rural areas, and 6 million household toilets in urban areas. In addition, nearly 6 million community and public toilets have also been constructed in the urban areas. Consequently, 4,234 cities and more than 600,000 villages across the country have declared themselves open defecation-free (ODF).

An independent survey released by Quality Council of India in August 2017, reported that overall national rural "household access to toilet" coverage increased to 62.5%, and usage of toilets to 91.3%. Haryana topped the national ranking with 99% of households in rural areas covered and usage of toilets at 100%. According to UNICEF, the number of people without a toilet reduced from 550 million to 50 million. The World Bank reports that 96% of Indians who have a toilet use it. The World Health Organization (WHO) has in its report stated that at least 180,000 diarrhoeal deaths were averted in rural India since the launch of the Swachh Bharat Mission. According to a survey carried out in 2018 and published in 2019 by National Statistical Office (NSO), 71% of rural households had access to toilets as of 2018. Though this disagreed with the Indian government's claim in 2019 that 95% of rural households had access to toilets, NSO's numbers still indicated a significant improvement over the situation during the previous survey period in 2012, when only 40% of rural households had access to toilets.

Community participation has played a significant role in sustaining the outcomes of the mission, particularly in urban areas, where local organizations assist in waste segregation, recycling, and behavioral change initiatives.

A study by Ashoka University concluded that the construction of toilets under the program led to a reduction in incidents of sexual assault against women. Toilet access for women has proven to reduce rates of sexual assault. Although the SBM itself describes its goal in patriarchal terms, as "preserving the dignity of women", scholars note the incidental benefit of reducing violence against women: between 2014 and 2016, studies estimate sexual assault against women fell by 25 incidents per million because of access to toilets.

Data from the National Family Health Surveys (NFHS) demonstrate the increase in access to improved sanitation due to SBM. Post 2015, 3.4% households gained access to better sanitation as compared to just 1.5% earlier.

== Reception ==
The mission is noted as the world's largest sanitation program. It claimed to have provided millions of people access to the toilet and brought about a change of behaviour towards its usage. Many argue that it has not eliminated open defecation as rapidly as the government claims. However, It significantly did accelerate the pace of decline in open defecation.

As a result of the Swachh Bharat Mission movement, 55 crore people in rural areas changed their behaviour and started using toilets. By achieving the objectives of the Swachh Bharat Movement, water and sanitation-related diseases have been reduced significantly. Due to the reduction of open defecation (ODF), deaths due to diseases like diarrhoea and malaria have decreased in many villages, children's health and nutrition have improved, and women do not need to wait until dark to defecate. Rs. 50,000 saved per household in rural India per year through the Swachh Bharat Mission Movement.

=== Political sponsorship ===
The SBM received political sponsorship from Prime Minister Modi who started talking about sanitation even before he was elected as the Prime Minister. He made a call to address the issue in his first address to the nation on the occasion of Independence day in 2014. Throughout the mission period, he continued to promote the mission through his speeches and was seen wielding the broom multiple times to clean the streets. In 2019, he plogged on a beach in Mamallapuram during his morning walk; he was there to attend the informal summit with Xi Jinping, then-General Secretary of the Chinese Communist Party. Other political leaders and public figures including actors and actresses, sportsmen and women, owners of large business houses were roped in as ambassadors to promote the mission.

=== Allocation of funds ===
Constructing toilets became the mission's singular focus, even though the core objectives were the elimination of open defecation and the improvement of solid waste management. Funds for solid waste management under the mission were diverted towards toilet construction. Allocations for other sectors were also drastically reduced. Though behavioural change is one of the goals of the mission, only 1% of the mission's outlay was spent on education and awareness. Most of the allocation for the category, "information, education and communication", that was to be used for awareness generation was spent towards print, radio and television advertisements. No part of the Central Government's allocation was spent on awareness generation at the grassroots.

=== Target-driven approach ===
The mission was implemented with a target-driven approach; villages, districts, towns, cities and even states declared themselves open defecation-free (ODF) based on the element of construction targets.

The SBM has also been criticized for being subsidy-driven rather than community-driven.

=== Inappropriate containment system ===
For lack of sewerage systems, most of the toilets constructed under the mission rely on single pit or twin pits or septic systems for containment of faecal sludge. However, their appropriateness for the local context was not considered in the haste of achieving construction targets. For example, most of the 7.85 million toilets constructed at an estimated cost of INR 94,205 million in the 15 extreme flood-prone districts of Northern Bihar become unusable during the annual floods. Besides the toilet itself being inaccessible, the containment structure is also inundated with flood waters, making it unusable.

The SBM does not even acknowledge the issues of the existing sewerage systems and the deaths of numerous sanitation workers caused by cleaning them.

=== Survey results ===
Even though the elimination of open defecation was the core objective of the mission, it was never monitored by either of the Ministries. They both kept track of toilets constructed and funds spent. Therefore, the reality reported by independent surveys was very different from that reported by Government-sponsored surveys. Researchers found divergence between findings of the National Family Health Survey (NFHS) and National Annual Rural Sanitation Survey (NARSS); both conducted by the Government only a few months apart.

=== Interconnected challenges ===
By adding millions of on-site sanitation systems and not considering fecal sludge management, it will further add to pollution of the rivers in India.

There is scepticism about the success of SBM, which relates to sanitation workers. The people who make India clean, the sanitation workers, remain "invisible in the participation, process or consequences of this national level movement". In 2015, one year after the launch of the program, hundreds of thousands of Indian people were still employed as manual scavengers in emptying bucket toilets and pit latrines. Many continue to work on contractual arrangements without safety of their job and benefits that would accrue from a government job. The SBM has instead burdened the contractual sanitation workers to keep public places clean while keeping it voluntary for the public to deface public places by urinating, defecating or littering them.

A report by WSSCC in 2019 found that the impact of the SBM for the most vulnerable was limited. The report stated that "Barriers due to physical disabilities, social/economic disparities, geography, sexual orientation, gender and caste were not addressed."

Delhi's three municipal corporations identified 543 road dust hotspots in November 2022, using mechanized road sweepers and water sprinklers to reduce dust. They submitted reports on air pollution mitigation measures to the Delhi government's green war room.

Irregularities about the funds have been reported. In Odisha hundreds of beneficiaries have filed complaints that money has been siphoned off without constructing the toilets. In Madhya Pradesh almost half a million Swachh Bharat toilets have "vanished" in a multi-billion rupees scam. In Bihar crores of rupees meant for Swachh Bharat Mission were siphoned off by Government officials in collusion with banks. Police complaints were filed against those who have misused Swachh Bharat funds for personal household expenses.

== Movie based on Swachh Bharat Mission ==
In August 2023, a movie titled Panch Kriti - Five Elements based on Swachh Bharat Mission was released in India, which featured five stories and is set in Chanderi in Bundelkhand, Madhya Pradesh, and was largely shot in real locations. It was a women-centric film that touched upon several important themes and topics about women. It also delves into the importance of social movements taking place in India like "Swachh Bharat Abhiyaan" and "Beti Bachao Beti Padhaao Abhiyaan".

== Corruption in Swachh Bharat Mission ==
In Madhya Pradesh, a whopping 540 crore scam was unearthed, wherein toilets that were supposed to be constructed between 2012 and 2018 existed only on paper. It was found that over 4.5 lakh toilets existed only on paper, and they were nowhere to be found on the ground.

In Gujarat, while hearing a Public Interest Litigation (PIL) in 2022, the High Court pointed out a scam in the construction of toilets in the Banaskantha district of north Gujarat.

In Rajasthan, like in other states, the government pays Rs 12,000 to every person who constructs a toilet in his/her home. The money is paid out under the Swachh Bharat Mission's Open Defecation-Free scheme, and the goal seems to be on its route to being achieved fast, but only on paper in Rajasthan.

In Balangir District, in Odisha state, huge irregularities were found in the construction of toilets and utilisation of the funds, and the Collector had recommended departmental action against the Senior Technical Consultant (STC) of Sarva Sikhya Abhiyan (SSA,) who is in charge of implementing the project in the district. However, the Government continues to sit pretty.

== Swachh Bharat Mission (Urban) ==
Swachh India Movement (Urban) aims to free urban India from open defecation and 100% scientific management of municipal solid waste in 4,000+ cities across the country. One of its targets is to construct 66 lakh Individual Household Latrines (IHHLs) by October 2, 2019. However, this target has been reduced to 59 lakh IHHLS by 2019. This target was achieved by 2020.

	Original Target	Revised Target (revised in 2019)	Actual Constructed
Individual Household Latrines	66,42,000	58,99,637	62,60,606
Community and Public Toilets	5,08,000	5,07,587	6,15,864

Sources: Swachh Bharat Mission Urban - Dashboard; PRS.

	Targets	As of March 2020	As of December 2020
Door-to-Door Waste Collection (Wards)	86,284	81,535 (96%)	83,435 (97%)
Source Segregation (Wards)	86,284	64,730 (75%)	67,367 (78%)
Waste Processing (in %)	100%	65%	68%

Sources: Standing Committee on Urban Development (2021); PRS.

Under SBM (U) from 2014 to 2021, the budget allocation for States/UTs is Rs.13,239.89 crore. Also, the budget allocation for SBM-U 2.0 (2021–2026) is Rs.30,980.20 crore.

== Swachh Rail, Swachh Bharat ==
- As part of the Swachh Bharat Mission, Indian Railways has launched the Swachh Rail, Swachh Bharat initiative has drawn up an action plan to switch over to eco-friendly bio-toilets, which helps to eliminate the direct flushing toilets from its entire passenger coaches by 2020–21. Furthermore, Indian Railways introduced bio-vacuum toilets in its Tejas Express train sets, which help to prevent water wastage.
- As India's first green rail line, the Rameswaram–Manamadurai route was selected and fitted with bio-toilets into 10 trains running on this route at first.
Yearwise installation of biotoilets (2014–2020) vertical bar chart of between 10-11 and 19-20
SRSB Year-wise progress on installation of (numbers of) bio-toilets in coaches

== Swachh Bharat Mission II ==
The first part of the Swachh Bharat Mission, which started in 2016, was completed in the last five years in 2020, but due to Covid and lockdown, the Center had extended its deadline to March 2021. In 2020, the Indian government launched Phase II of the Swachh Bharat Mission. This phase focuses on maintaining current Open Defecation Free (ODF) statuses across the country, as well as improving waste management in villages. Villages that maintain the ODF status and also implement waste management systems are designated "ODF Plus", while villages that have partially implemented waste management systems (e.g. for only one of solid or liquid waste) are designated "ODF Plus Aspiring". In May 2023, the Indian government announced that 50% of villages in India had achieved the ODF Plus status, with the state of Telangana achieving a 100% ODF Plus rate.

== See also ==
- Green train corridor
- Indian states ranking by availability of toilets
- List of cleanest cities in India
- List of cleanest railway stations in India
- Community-led total sanitation
- Digital India
- Electronic toilet
- India.gov.in
- Toilet: Ek Prem Katha — a feature film
- Water supply and sanitation in India
- LooCafe
- No Toilet, No Bride
- Take Poo to the Loo
