= LooCafe =

Indian public toilet model

LooCafe - Ixora Corporate Services
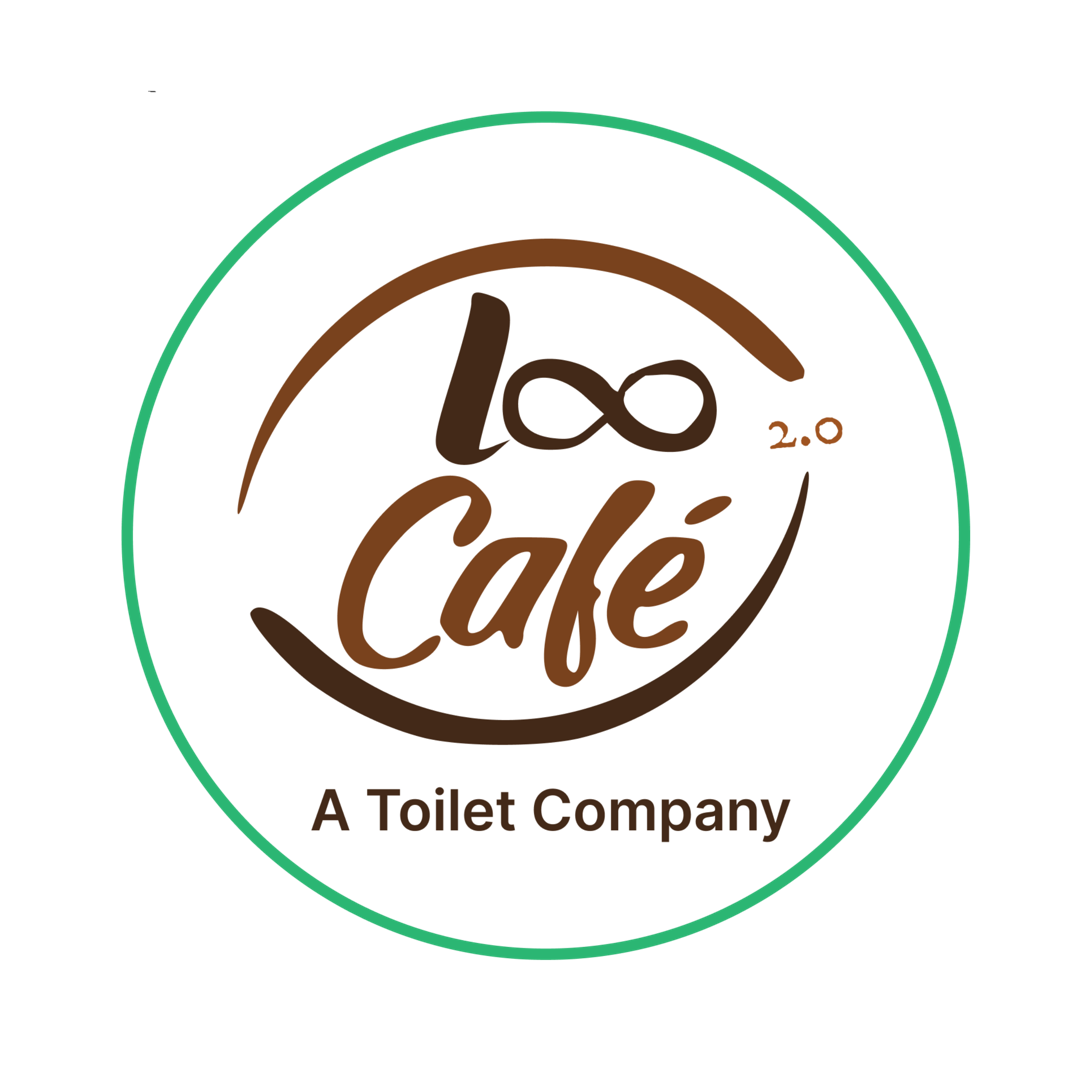
- Industry: Sanitation
- Founder: Abhishek Nath (CEO)
- Headquarters: Hyderabad, India
- Key people: Vedanth Nath (Head of Innovation)
- Parent: Ixora Group
- Website: loocafe.com

LooCafe is an Indian public toilet model, built out of shipping containers with a point of sale attached with additional features. The company, legally incorporated as Ixora Corporate Services, works in the WASH industry.

LooCafe is designed to end open defecation and public urination onto buildings, sidewalks, or streets, and create access to public toilets under the Swachh Bharat Mission.

== History ==
Founded in 2018 by Abhishek Nath, LooCafe started from Hyderabad and now are currently operational in multiple Indian states and districts, including Jammu and Kashmir, Tamil Nadu and Telangana.

In 2025, Abhishek Nath launched ReFlow Toilets, a sanitation infrastructure initiative focused on district-level deployments that promotes Bio-Circular Resource Technology (B-CRT).

== Model ==
Most public toilets in India fail because of maintenance issues and a variety of government challenges.

LooCafes are designed to be sustainable models because of their business model. Revenue from the café or point of sale helps them sustain the public toilets that are built towards the back out of the shipping container. The usage of IoT devices and facility management technology have also helped them expand their footprint to 350 units across India. In 2019, they won Confederation of Indian Industry awards.

== Institutions ==
LooCafes have worked with the British Council, Hyderabad Design Week, and the Greater Hyderabad Municipal Corporation (GHMC).

For their social work a book was also launched titled Toilet Tales.

The toilets have operated during the COVID-19 pandemic in India with respect to disinfection work for public facilities.

== LooCafe models ==
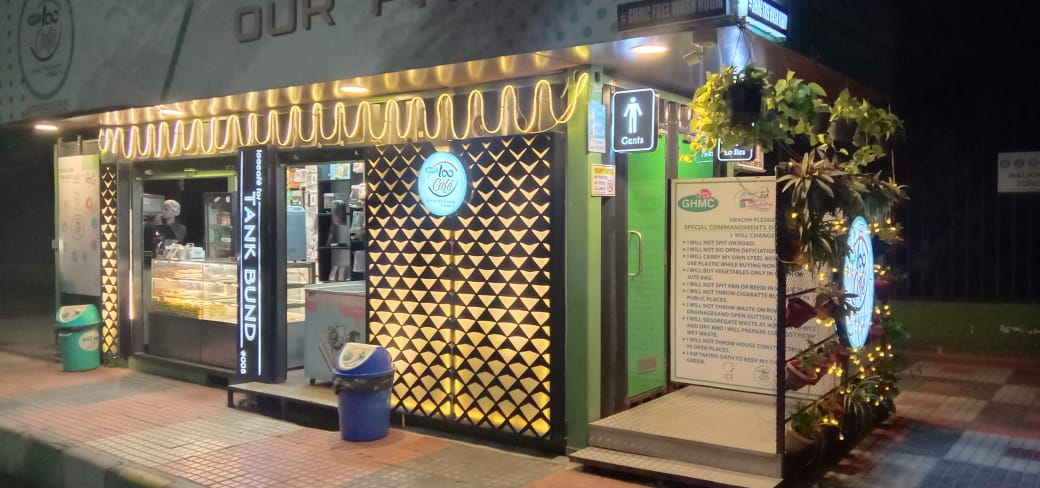
LooCafe installed at Tank Bund Road

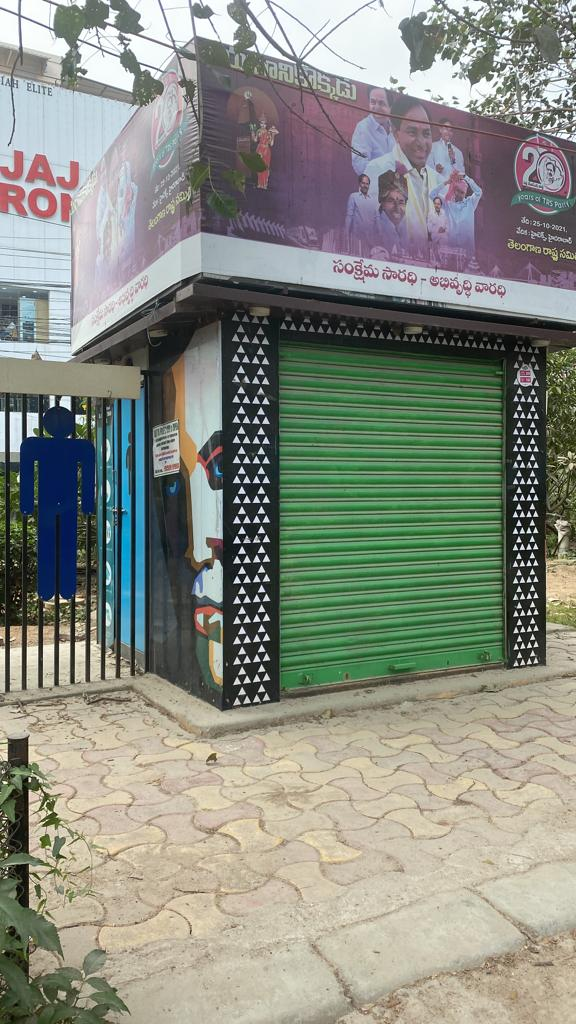
LooCafe Mini Model
