= Kunwar Bai Yadav =

- Died: 23 February 2018 (aged 106); Raipur, Chhattisgarh, India
- Occupation: Activist
- Known for: Toilets

Kunwar Bai Yadav (died 23 February 2018, aged 106) was a woman who lived in a village in Dhamtari district in the central Indian state of Chhattisgarh. In her old age, inspired by the Swachh Bharat Abhiyan (Clean India Campaign), she sold seven of her goats to raise the money to build a toilet at her house. In 2016, the district was declared the first in the state to be free of open defecation, and she was declared a mascot of the campaign and visited by Prime Minister Narendra Modi.

== Life ==
Yadav lived in Kotabharri, a village in Dhamtari district, Chhattisgarh. The villagers had always defecated in the open, in the forest. In 2015, she heard about toilets for the first time in a presentation at the local school as part of the Swachh Bharat Abhiyan, a campaign to end open defecation by 2 October 2019, the 150th anniversary of the birth of Mahatma Gandhi. She sold seven of her two dozen goats, her only available assets, and with the help of a daughter-in-law who works as a day labourer, raised the ₹22,000 to build a toilet at the house she shared with her family. Others in the village followed suit, and, in late 2016, the district became officially free of open defecation, the first district in the State to achieve this.

Prime Minister Narendra Modi visited Kotabharri and bowed and touched Yadav's feet. She has been declared a mascot of the Clean India Campaign.

Yadav was admitted to Ambedkar Hospital in Raipur after becoming ill. She died there on 23 February 2018, aged 106.
