= Indian states ranking by availability of toilets =

This is a list of Indian states and territories ranked by the availability of toilet facilities per household. Figures are from the 2011 census of India.

== List ==
An increasing trend has been seen in India with how many households have toilet facilities.

Kerala, Mizoram, and Lakshadweep State/UT have a higher number of households having toilet facilities in both 2001 and 2011 in comparison to other states. Lakshadweep has the highest households having toilet facilities 89.2% in 2001, 97.8% in 2011, and 100% in 2017.

Seven states viz. Bihar, Odisha, Assam, Goa, and Tripura are below the national estimate of 25.21% in 2019.

According to a 2019 report, referring to 2017 data, 25.21% of the country has achieved ODF Status and has full access to toilets.

	Year 2001			Year 2011			Year 2019		
All India/State/Union Territory	Total	Rural	Urban	Total	Rural	Urban	Rural	Urban	Total
Lakshadweep	89.2	93.14	83.77	97.8	98.1	97.7	100		
Kerala	84.01	81.33	92.02	95.2	93.2	97.4	100		
Mizoram	89.02	79.74	98.03	91.9	84.6	98.5	100		
Delhi	77.96	62.88	79.03	89.5	76.3	89.8	100	100	100
Manipur	82.03	77.5	95.31	89.3	86	95.8	100		
Chandigarh	78.85	68.53	80.07	87.6	88	87.6	100		
Sikkim	63.38	59.35	91.79	87.2	84.1	95.2	100		
Tripura	81.45	77.93	96.96	86	81.5	97.9	97.64		
Goa	58.64	48.21	69.23	79.7	70.9	85.3	89.22		
Punjab	56.84	40.91	86.52	79.3	70.4	93.4	100		
Daman and Diu	43.94	32.02	65.43	78.2	51.4	85.4	100		
Nagaland	70.57	64.64	94.12	76.5	69.2	94.6	100		
A. & N. Islands	53.28	42.33	76.49	70.1	60.2	87.1	100		
Himachal Pradesh	33.43	27.72	77.22	69.1	66.6	89.1	100		
Haryana	44.5	28.66	80.66	68.6	56.1	89.9	100		
Puducherry	49.94	21.42	65.04	68.4	39	82	100		
Uttarakhand	45.2	31.6	86.88	65.8	54.1	93.6	100		
Assam	64.64	59.57	94.6	64.9	59.6	93.7	98.3		
Meghalaya	51.19	40.1	91.58	62.9	53.9	95.7	100		
Arunachal Pradesh	56.3	47.34	86.95	62	52.7	89.5	100		
West Bengal	55.71	62.93	64.85	71.8	75.7	89.64	100		
Gujarat	44.6	21.65	80.55	57.3	33	87.7	100		
D. & N. Haveli	32.56	17.32	77.2	54.7	26.5	81.3	100		
Maharashtra	35.09	18.21	58.08	53.1	38	71.3	100		
Jammu and Kashmir	53.14	41.8	86.87	51.2	38.6	87.5	100		
Karnataka	37.49	17.4	75.23	51.2	28.4	84.9	100		
Andhra Pradesh	32.99	18.15	78.07	49.6	32.2	86.1	100		
Tamil Nadu	35.15	14.36	64.33	48.3	23.2	75.1	100		
All India	36.41	21.92	73.72	46.9	30.7	81.4	98.21		
Uttar Pradesh	31.43	19.23	80.01	35.6	21.8	83.1	100		
Rajasthan	29	14.61	76.11	35	19.6	82	100		
Madhya Pradesh	23.99	8.94	67.74	28.8	13.1	74.2	100		
Chhattisgarh	14.2	5.18	52.59	24.6	14.5	60.2	100		
Bihar	19.19	13.91	69.69	23.1	17.6	51	68.6		
Jharkhand	19.67	6.57	66.68	22	7.6	67.2	100		
Odisha	14.89	7.71	59.69	22	23.1	68.7	91.68		
