= List of cleanest cities in India =

City Rating under the Swachh Bharat Abhiyan scheme

The Ministry of Urban Development, Government of India, and the Central Pollution Control Board (CPCB) of India, annually publish National City Rating under the Swachh Bharat Abhiyan scheme. The rating includes around 500 cities, covering 72 percent of the urban population in India.

Until 2017, India was divided into five zones for the purpose of this survey and each city was scored on 19 indicators. The cities were classified into four colours: green, blue, black, and red, green being the cleanest city, and red the most polluted. None of the cities was rated as green—the best category in the exercise. However, during the 2017-18 senses survey, the parameters of assessment were modified, and cities were categorised, based on population, into metropolis, large, medium, and small cities, and assessment took place according to this categorisation.

The latest ranking of 2023 by the cleanliness survey Swachh Survekshan marks Indore as the cleanest city of India. Indore has held the title of being India's cleanest city for seven consecutive years.

== Summary ==
The Ministry of Housing and Urban Affairs ranks cities based on cleanliness index. This list summarises the cities topping those lists annually.

Year	First			Runner up	
Year	City		State	City	State
2021	Indore		Madhya Pradesh	Surat	Gujarat
2020	Metropolis	Indore	Madhya Pradesh	Surat	Gujarat
2020	Big city	Ahmedabad	Gujarat		
2020	Medium city	Mysore	Karnataka		
2020	Small city	Ambikapur	Chhattisgarh		
2019	Metropolis	Indore	Madhya Pradesh	Ambikapur	Chhattisgarh
2019	Big city	Ahmedabad	Gujarat		
2019	Medium city	Ujjain	Madhya Pradesh	Mysore	Karnataka
2019	Small city	New Delhi (Municipal Council)	Delhi		
2018	Metropolis	Indore	Madhya Pradesh	Bhopal	Madhya Pradesh
2018	Big city	Vijayawada	Andhra Pradesh		
2018	Medium city	Mysore	Karnataka		
2018	Small city	New Delhi (Municipal Council)	Delhi		
2017	Indore		Madhya Pradesh	Bhopal	Madhya Pradesh
2016	Mysore		Karnataka	Chandigarh	Chandigarh Territory
2015	Mysore		Karnataka	Tiruchirapalli	Tamil Nadu
2010	Chandigarh		Union Territory of Chandigarh	Mysore	Karnataka

== 2023 ==
Swachh Sarvekshan 2023

Top 20 cleanest cities in India

Swachh Sarvekshan Rank	City	State/Union Territory
1	Indore	Madhya Pradesh
2	Surat	Gujarat
3	Navi Mumbai	Maharashtra
4	Visakhapatnam	Andhra Pradesh
5	Bhopal	Madhya Pradesh
6	Vijayawada	Andhra Pradesh
7	New Delhi	Delhi
8	Tirupati	Andhra Pradesh
9	Hyderabad	Telangana
10	Pune	Maharashtra
11	Chandigarh	Chandigarh
12	Raipur	Chhattisgarh
13	Pimpri-Chinchwad	Maharashtra
14	Noida	Uttar Pradesh
15	Ahmedabad	Gujarat
16	Gwalior	Madhya Pradesh
17	Guntur	Andhra Pradesh
18	Baramati	Maharashtra
19	Ujjain	Madhya Pradesh
20	Mira-Bhayandar	Maharashtra
Source: Ministry of Urban Development

== 2022 ==
Swachh Sarvekshan 2022

Top 20 cleanest cities in India over 1 million population

Swachh Sarvekshan Rank	City	State/Union Territory
1	Indore	Madhya Pradesh
2	Surat	Gujarat
3	Navi Mumbai	Maharashtra
4	Visakhapatnam	Andhra Pradesh
5	Vijayawada	Andhra Pradesh
6	Bhopal	Madhya Pradesh
7	Rajkot	Gujarat
8	Ahmedabad	Gujarat
9	Pune	Maharashtra
10	Hyderabad	Telangana
11	Raipur	Chhattisgarh
12	Ghaziabad	Uttar Pradesh
13	Thane	Maharashtra
14	Vadodara	Gujarat
15	Meerut	Uttar Pradesh
16	Prayagraj	Uttar Pradesh
17	Lucknow	Uttar Pradesh
18	Gwalior	Madhya Pradesh
19	Pimpri-Chinchwad	Maharashtra
20	Nashik	Maharashtra
Source: Ministry of Urban Development

== 2021 ==
Top 10 cleanest cities in the Swachh Survekshan 2021 for over 1 million Population

Swachh Sarvekshan Rank	City	State/Union Territory
1	Indore	Madhya Pradesh
2	Surat	Gujarat
3	Vijayawada	Andhra Pradesh
4	Navi Mumbai	Maharashtra
5	Pune	Maharashtra
6	Raipur	Chhattisgarh
7	Bhopal	Madhya Pradesh
8	Vadodara	Gujarat
9	Visakhapatnam	Andhra Pradesh
10	Ahmedabad	Gujarat
Source: Ministry of Urban Development

== 2019-2020 ==
The results of the fifth edition of the nationwide annual cleanliness survey, 'Swachh Survekshan 2020,' are out and Madhya Pradesh's Indore has yet again made it as India's cleanest city. Gujarat's Surat emerged as India's second cleanest city, followed by Navi Mumbai which bagged the third spot in Ministry of Housing and Urban Affairs' swachhta city survey report.

Swachh Survekshan 2020 covered 4,242 cities, 62 cantonment boards and 92 Ganga towns. This survey was carried out in 28 days.

List of Cleanest Cities in India 2020, are as follows:

Swachh Survekshan Rank	City	State/Union Territory
1	Indore	Madhya Pradesh
2	Surat	Gujarat
3	Navi Mumbai	Maharashtra
4	Ambikapur	Chhattisgarh
5	Mysore	Karnataka
6	Vijayawada	Andhra Pradesh
7	Ahmedabad	Gujarat
8	New Delhi (NDMC)	Delhi
9	Chandrapur	Maharashtra
10	Khargone	Madhya Pradesh
Source: Ministry of Housing and Urban Affairs.

== 2017-2018 ==
The dimensions of assessment increased during the 2017–18 survey, identifying cities and states to excel in different aspects of environment, energy, and cleanliness.

== 2016–2017 ==
Swachh Survekshan 2017 was an extensive sanitation survey across 500 cities in India. The Ministry of Urban Development commissioned Quality Council of India to conduct this survey; to check the progress and impact of Swachh Bharat Abhiyan launched in 2014. It aims to foster a spirit of competition among the cities and offers a comprehensive assessment of their sanitation status.

The performance of each city was evaluated on five key thematic parameters-

- • Municipal solid waste - sweeping, collection and transportation
- • Municipal solid waste - processing and disposal of solid waste
- • Open defecation free/toilets
- • Capacity building and eLearning
- • Provision of public & community toilet seats
- • Information, education and communication, and behaviour change

Swachh Sarvekshan 2017 was conducted between 4 January 2017 and 7 February 2017. The results of top 30 cities are as follows:

Swachh Sarvekshan Rank	City	State/Union Territory
1	Indore	Madhya Pradesh
2	Bhopal	Madhya Pradesh
3	Visakhapatnam	Andhra Pradesh
4	Surat	Gujarat
5	Mysore	Karnataka
6	Tiruchirapalli	Tamil Nadu
7	New Delhi Municipal Council	Delhi
8	Navi Mumbai	Maharashtra
9	Tirupati	Andhra Pradesh
10	Vadodara	Gujarat
11	Chandigarh	Chandigarh
12	Ujjain	Madhya Pradesh
13	Pune	Maharashtra
14	Ahmedabad	Gujarat
15	Ambikapur	Chhattisgarh
16	Coimbatore	Tamil Nadu
17	Khargone	Madhya Pradesh
18	Rajkot	Gujarat
19	Vijayawada	Andhra Pradesh
20	Gandhinagar	Gujarat
21	Jabalpur	Madhya Pradesh
22	Greater Hyderabad Municipal Corporation	Telangana
23	Sagar	Madhya Pradesh
24	Murwara	Madhya Pradesh
25	Navsari	Gujarat
26	Vapi	Gujarat
27	Gwalior	Madhya Pradesh
28	Warangal	Telangana
29	Mumbai	Maharashtra
30	Suryapet	Telangana
Source: Ministry of Urban Development

== 2015–2016 ==
The Union Ministry of Urban Development commissioned an extensive survey to study the progress of Prime Minister Narendra Modi's Swachh Bharat Mission and to rank 73 cities on sanitation and cleanliness. The survey, the first for the Swachh Bharat Mission, was conducted by the Quality Council of India (QCI) and was named Swachh Sarvekshan. It covered all state capitals and another 53 cities with a population of above one million. It involved three streams of data collection - interaction with municipal body, direct observation and citizen feedback. Swachh Sarvekshan evaluated the work done in the following six measurable aspects of sanitation and hygiene:

- • Strategy for Open Defecation Free town (ODF) and Integrated Solid Waste Management (SWM)
- • Information, Education and Behaviour Change Communication (IEBC) activity
- • Sweeping, door to door collection and transportation (of solid waste)
- • Processing and disposal (of solid waste)
- • Provision of public & community toilet seats
- • Construction of household individual toilets

Swachh Sarvekshan 2016 was conducted between 5 January 2016 and 20 January 2016. The Results, as per the latest available sources, are as follows:

Swachh Sarvekshan Rank	City	State/Union Territory
1	Mysore	Karnataka
2	Chandigarh	Chandigarh
3	Tiruchirapalli	Tamil Nadu
4	New Delhi	Delhi
5	Visakhapatnam	Andhra Pradesh
6	Surat	Gujarat
7	Rajkot	Gujarat
8	Gangtok	Sikkim
9	Pimpri-Chinchwad	Maharashtra
10	Mumbai	Maharashtra
11	Pune	Maharashtra
12	Navi Mumbai	Maharashtra
13	Vadodara	Gujarat
14	Ahmedabad	Gujarat
15	Imphal	Manipur
16	Panaji	Goa
17	Thane	Maharashtra
18	Coimbatore	Tamil Nadu
19	Hyderabad	Telangana
20	Nagpur	Maharashtra
21	Bhopal	Madhya Pradesh
22	Allahabad	Uttar Pradesh
23	Vijayawada	Andhra Pradesh
24	Bhubaneshwar	Odisha
25	Indore	Madhya Pradesh
26	Madurai	Tamil Nadu
27	Shimla	Himachal Pradesh
28	Lucknow	Uttar Pradesh
29	Jaipur	Rajasthan
30	Gwalior	Madhya Pradesh
31	Nashik	Maharashtra
32	Warangal	Telangana
33	Agartala	Tripura
34	Ludhiana	Punjab
35	Vasai-Virar	Maharashtra
36	Chennai	Tamil Nadu
37	Gurgaon	Haryana
38	Bengaluru	Karnataka
39	SDMC	Delhi
40	Thiruvananthapuram	Kerala
41	Aizawl	Mizoram
42	Gandhinagar	Gujarat
43	NMCD	Delhi
44	Kozhikode	Kerala
45	Kanpur	Uttar Pradesh
46	Durg	Chhattisgarh
47	Agra	Uttar Pradesh
48	Srinagar	Jammu and Kashmir
49	Amritsar	Punjab
50	Guwahati	Assam
51	Faridabad	Haryana
52	EMCD	Delhi
53	Shillong	Meghalaya
54	Hubli-Dharwad	Karnataka
55	Kochi	Kerala
56	Aurangabad	Maharashtra
57	Jodhpur	Rajasthan
58	Kota	Rajasthan
59	Cuttack	Odisha
60	Kohima	Nagaland
61	Dehradun	Uttarakhand
62	Ranchi	Jharkhand
63	Jabalpur	Madhya Pradesh
64	Kalyan-Dombivali	Maharashtra
65	Varanasi	Uttar Pradesh
66	Jamshedpur	Jharkhand
67	Ghaziabad	Uttar Pradesh
68	Raipur	Chhattisgarh
69	Meerut	Uttar Pradesh
70	Patna	Bihar
71	Itanagar	Arunachal Pradesh
72	Asansol	West Bengal
73	Dhanbad	Jharkhand
Source: Press Information Bureau and Ministry of Urban Development

== 2014–2015 ==
Rank	City	State/Territory	Rating points (out of 20)
1	Mysore	Karnataka	18.50
2	Tiruchirapalli	Tamil Nadu	14.25
3	Navi Mumbai	Maharashtra	14.18
4	Kochi	Kerala	14.07
5	Hassan	Karnataka	13.58
6	Mandya	Karnataka	13.52
7	Bengaluru	Karnataka	13.27
8	Thiruvananthapuram	Kerala	12.98
9	Halisahar	West Bengal	12.75
10	Gangtok	Sikkim	12.68
Source: Ministry of Urban Development

According to the Central Pollution Control Board (CPCB) India, in 2015 it conducted a survey of the least polluted cities in India as well, ranked based on air quality. Among the least-polluted cities are Pathanamthitta, Mangalore, Wayanad, Hassan, and Palakkad. The table below shows the ranking of these cities as per the PM10 content in the air.

Rank	City	State/Territory	PM10
1	Pathanamthitta	Kerala	23
2	Mangalore	Karnataka	31
3	Wayanad	Kerala	33
4	Hassan	Karnataka	36
5	Palakkad	Kerala	36
Source: Central Pollution Control Board (CPCB) India

== 2009–2010 ==
Rank	City	State/Territory	Rating points
1	Chandigarh	Union Territory of Chandigarh	73.48
2	Mysore	Karnataka	70.65
3	Surat	Gujarat	69.08
4	New Delhi	Delhi	68.265
5	Delhi Cantt.	Delhi	61.367
6	Tiruchirappalli	Tamil Nadu	59.02
7	Jamshedpur	Jharkhand	57.960
8	Mangalore	Karnataka	57.340
9	Rajkot	Gujarat	56.118
10	Kanpur	Uttar Pradesh	55.340
11	Navi Mumbai	Maharashtra	53.920
12	Bangalore	Karnataka	53.637
13	Chennai	Tamil Nadu	53.630
14	Rourkela	Odisha	53.400
15	Mandya	Karnataka	53.330
16	Bidhannagar	West Bengal	52.820
17	Noida	Uttar Pradesh	51.910
18	Shillong	Meghalaya	51.550
19	Ahmedabad	Gujarat	50.286
20	Alandur	Tamil Nadu	50.240
21	Haridwar	Uttarakhand	49.850
22	Bidar	Karnataka	49.820
23	Achalpur	Maharashtra	49.666
24	Vijayawada	Andhra Pradesh	49.060
25	Kolkata	West Bengal	48.965
Source: Ministry of Urban Development

== See also ==
- Swachh Bharat Abhiyan
- Central Pollution Control Board
- List of least polluted cities by particulate matter concentration
