= Bokashi (horticulture) =

Food waste processing technique involving fermentation

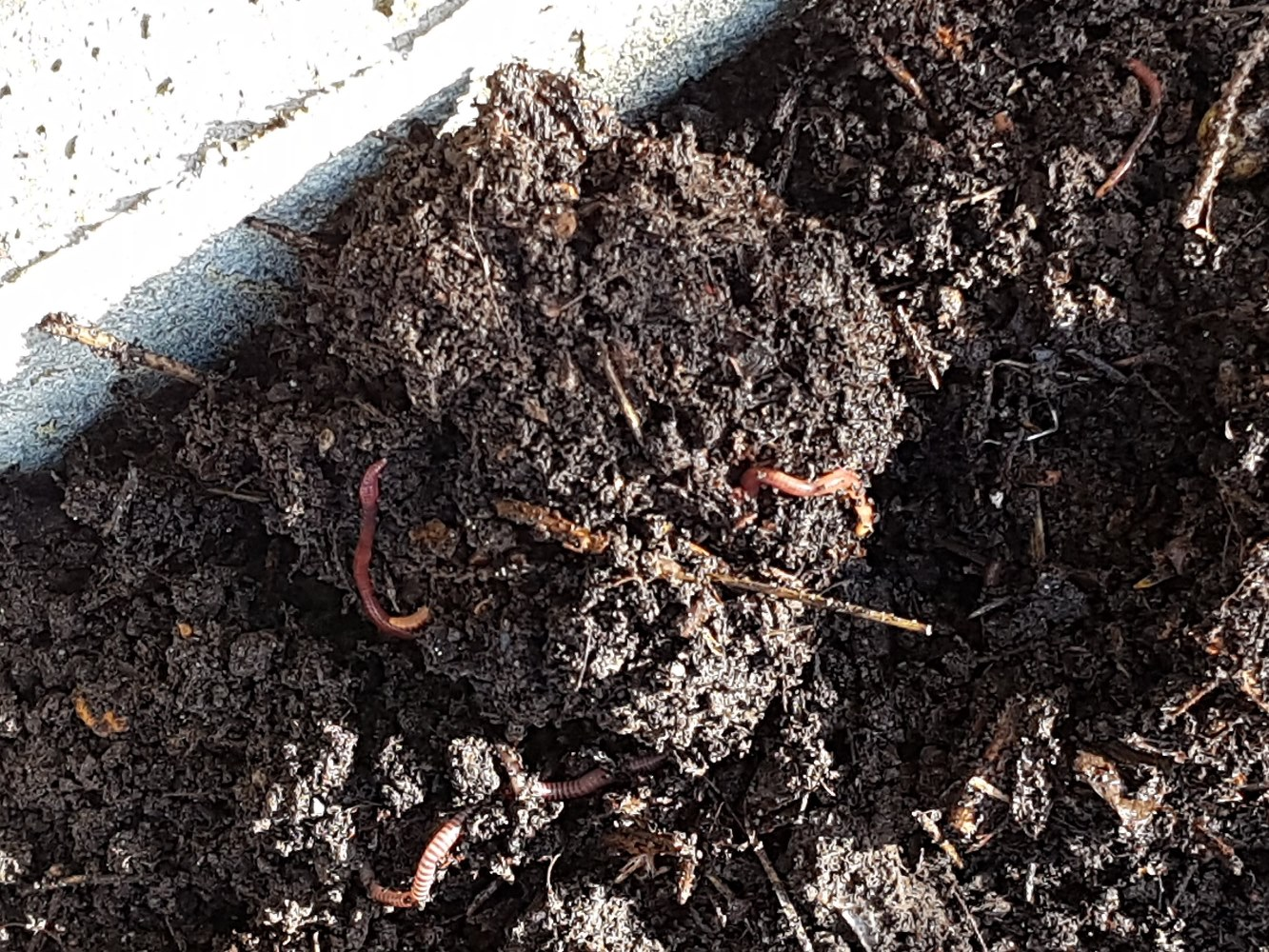
A soil ball with indigenous worms in soil amended a few weeks previously with bokashi fermented matter.

Bokashi (also referred to as bokashi composting, bokashi fermentation and fermented composting) is an anaerobic composting method that converts food waste and organic matter into a soil amendment using specialized bran. The result of this process is similar in many ways to traditional compost. The nature of bokashi reduces risk of nutrient leaching, and does not emit the greenhouse gas nor heat typically released by traditional hot compost methods. These factors make it appealing for urban agriculturists, as it can be easily done inside a home or apartment in manageable quantities without odor.

Bokashi composting originated in Korea, and has spread widely around the globe, particularly in dense urban areas of eastern Asia, where it is viewed as a way to reduce waste and promote healthy cities.

== Nomenclature ==
The name bokashi is transliterated from spoken Japanese (ぼかし). However, Japanese-English dictionaries give the word an older artistic meaning: "shading or gradation" of images – especially applied to woodblock prints. This later extended to mean pixellation or fogging in censored photographs. Therefore, its application to fermented organic matter is of uncertain origin; if both uses are related, unifying concepts may be "alteration" or "fading away".

Bokashi as a food waste process is borrowed in many other languages. As a noun, it has various meanings depending on context, in particular the process itself, the inoculant and the fermented output. This variety can lead to confusion. As an adjective, it qualifies any related noun, such as bokashi bin (a household fermentation vessel), bokashi soil (after adding the preserve), and even bokashi composting – a contradiction in terms.

== Process ==
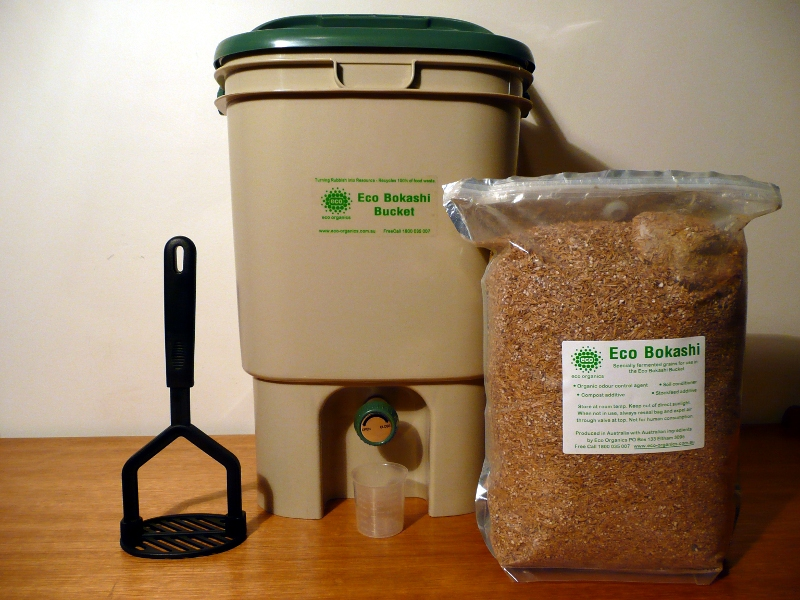
A household bokashi bin with a supply of fermentation starter, namely bran inoculated with Yeast, Photosynthetic Bacteria, and Lactic Acid Bacteria.

The basic stages of the process are:

1. Organic matter is inoculated with yeast, photosynthetic bacteria, and lactic acid bacteria. These will convert a fraction of the carbohydrates in the input to lactic acid by homolactic fermentation.
2. Fermented anaerobically (more precisely, microaerobically) for a few weeks at typical room temperatures in an airtight vessel, the organic matter is preserved by the acid, in a process closely related to the making of some fermented foods and silage. The preserve is normally applied to soil when ready, or can be stored unopened for later use.
3. The preserve is mixed into soil that has naturally occurring micro-organisms.
4. When water is present (as in the preserve itself or in the soil) the lactic acid progressively dissociates by losing protons to become lactate – the acid's conjugate base or ion salt. Lactate is a fundamental energy carrier in biological processes. It can pass through cell membranes and almost all living organisms have the enzyme lactate dehydrogenase to convert it to pyruvate for energy production.
5. Suffused with lactate, the preserve is readily consumed by the indigenous soil life, primarily the bacteria, 'disappearing' within a very few weeks at normal temperatures. Earthworm action is typically prominent as bacteria are themselves consumed, such that the amended soil acquires a texture associated with vermicompost.

== Characteristics ==
=== Accepted inputs ===
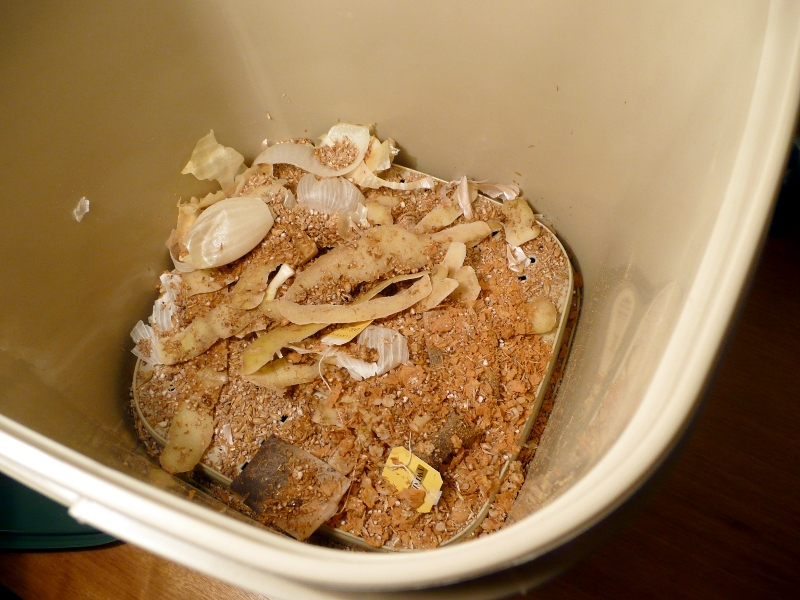
Inside a recently started bokashi bin. Food scraps are raised on a perforated plate (to drain runoff) and are partly covered by a layer of bran.

The process is typically applied to food waste from households, workplaces and catering establishments, because such waste normally holds a good proportion of carbohydrates. It is applied to other organic waste by supplementing carbohydrates and hence lactic acid production. Recipes for large scale bokashi in horticulture often include rice, and molasses or sugar. Any carbohydrate-poor waste stream would benefit from this.

Homolactic fermentation can process significantly more kinds of food waste than home composting. Even items considered problematic in traditional composting, such as cooked leftovers, meat and skin, fat, cheese and citrus waste are, in effect, pre-digested to enable soil life to consume them. Large pieces may take longer to ferment and concave surfaces may trap air, in which cases cutting down is advised in support literature.

Pieces of input are discarded if they are already badly rotten, or show black or green mould. These harbour putrefying organisms which may overwhelm the fermentation.

=== Emissions ===
==== Carbon, gases and energy ====
Homolactic fermentation and similar anaerobic fermentation pathways in general provide a very small amount of energy to the cell compared to the aerobic process. In homolactic fermentation, 2 ATP molecules are made when one glucose molecule (produced by digesting complex carbohydrates) is converted to 2 lactic acid molecules, only 1/15 of what aerobic respiration provides. The process will also halt before all available carbohydrates are used, as the acidity ends up inhibiting all bacteria. As a result, a bokashi bucket barely heats up and remains at ambient temperature.

As a waste processing technique, bokashi is notable in that minimal loss of mass in the form of offgassing happens. Compost, which is aerobic, "burns up" much of the carbon into carbon dioxide to sustain the metabolism of microbes as it matures. Biogas production does not burn the carbon, but the bacterial culture is optimized to extract the carbon in the form of methane – a potent greenhouse gas and a useful fuel. In addition, compost can also lose the key plant nutrient nitrogen (in the potent greenhouse gas nitrous oxide and in ammonia), while bokashi almost does not.

==== Runoff ====
When fermentation begins, physical structures start to break down and release some of the input's water content as a liquid runoff. Over time this constitutes more than 10% of the input by weight. The quantity varies with the input: for example cucumber and melon flesh lead to a noticeable increase.

The liquid leaches out a valuable fraction of proteins, nutrients and lactic acid. To recover them, and to avoid drowning the fermentation, runoff is captured from the fermentation vessel, either through a tap, into a base of absorbent material such as biochar or waste cardboard, or into a lower chamber. The runoff is sometimes called "bokashi tea".

The uses of bokashi tea are not the same as those of "compost tea". It is used most effectively when diluted and sprinkled over a targeted area of soil to feed the soil ecosystem. Dilution makes it less acidic and thus less dangerous to plants. Dilution also causes more acid to convert into lactate which is an attractive food for soil microbes. Other uses are either potentially damaging (e.g. feeding plants with acidic water) or wasteful (e.g. cleaning drains with plant nutrients, feeding plants with nutrients in a form they cannot take up).

=== Volumes ===
Household containers ("bokashi bins") typically give a batch size of 5–10 kilograms (11–22 lb). This is accumulated over a few weeks of regular additions. Each regular addition is best accumulated in a caddy, because it is recommended that one opens the bokashi bin no more frequently than once per day to let anaerobic conditions predominate.

In horticultural settings batches can be orders of magnitude greater. Silage technology may be usable if it is adapted to capture runoff. An industrial-scale technique mimics the windrows of large-scale composting, except that bokashi windrows are compacted, covered tightly and left undisturbed, all to promote anaerobic conditions. One study suggests that such windrows lose only minor amounts of carbon, energy and nitrogen.

=== Hygiene ===
Bokashi is inherently hygienic in the following senses:

- Lactic acid is a strong natural bactericide, with well-known antimicrobial properties. It is an active ingredient of some toilet cleaners. As more is produced, it eventually suppresses even its own makers, the acid-resistant lactobacilli, such that bokashi fermentation eventually slows and stops itself. There is also evidence that mesophilic (ambient temperature) fermentation kills eggs of the Ascaris worm – a parasite of humans – in 14 days.
- The fermentation bin does not release smells when it is closed. A household bin is only opened for a minute or so to add and inoculate input via the lid or to drain runoff via the tap. At these times the user encounters the sour odour of lacto-fermentation (often described as a "pickle") which is much less offensive than the odour of decomposition.
- When closed, an airtight fermentation bin cannot attract insects.
- Bokashi literature claims that scavengers dislike the fermented matter and avoid it in gardens.

=== Addition to soil ===
Fermented bokashi is added to a suitable area of soil. The approach usually recommended by suppliers of household bokashi is along the lines of "dig a trench in the soil in your garden, add the waste and cover over."

In practice, regularly finding suitable sites for trenches that will later underlie plants is difficult in an established plot. To address this, an alternative is a 'soil factory'. This is a bounded area of soil into which several loads of bokashi preserve are mixed over time. Amended soil can be taken from it for use elsewhere. It may be of any size. It may be permanently sited or in rotation. It may be enclosed, wire-netted or covered to keep out surface animals. Spent soil or compost, and organic amendments such as biochar may be added, as may non-fermented material, in which case the boundary between bokashi and composting becomes blurred.

A proposed alternative is to homogenise (and potentially dilute) the preserve into a slurry, which is spread on the soil surface. This approach requires energy for homogenisation but, logically from the characteristics set out above, should confer several advantages: thoroughly oxidising the preserve; disturbing no deeper layers, except by increased worm action; being of little use to scavenging animals; applicable to large areas; and, if done repeatedly, able to sustain a more extensive soil ecosystem.

== History ==
The practice of bokashi is believed to have its earliest roots in ancient Korea. This traditional form ferments waste directly in soil, relying on native bacteria and on careful burial for an anaerobic environment. A modernised horticultural method called Korean Natural Farming includes fermentation by indigenous micro-organisms (IM or IMO) harvested locally, but has numerous other elements too. A commercial Japanese bokashi method was developed by Teruo Higa in 1982 under the 'EM' trademark (short for Effective Microorganisms). EM became the best known form of bokashi worldwide, mainly in household use, claiming to have reached over 120 countries.

While none have disputed that EM starts homolactic fermentation and hence produces a soil amendment, other claims have been contested robustly. Controversy relates partly to other uses, such as direct inoculation of soil with EM and direct feeding of EM to animals, and partly to whether the soil amendment's effects are due simply to the energy and nutrient values of the fermented material rather than to particular microorganisms. Arguably, EM's heavy focus on microorganisms has diverted scientific attention away from both the bokashi process as a whole and the particular roles in it of lactic acid, lactate, and soil life above the bacterial level.

== Alternative approaches ==
Some organisms in EM, specifically photosynthetic bacteria and yeast, appear to be logically superfluous, as they will first be suppressed by the dark and anaerobic environment of homolactic fermentation, then killed by its lactic acid. Consequently, practitioners have sought to reduce costs and to widen the scale of operations. Success has been reported with:

- Self-harvested micro-organisms, tested for lacto-fermentation;
- Lactobacilli alone, i.e. without other EM micro-organisms. Useful sources include acid whey from yogurt and sauerkraut juice.
- Alternative substrates for inoculant, such as newsprint;
- Home-made airtight fermentation vessels;
- Larger scale than a household, for example a group of small farmers.
- No intentional addition of microbes at all, similar to the original Korean method. The resulting mixture will smell worse as acetic acid, propanoic acid, and butyric acid can form instead of lactic acid (see mixed acid fermentation), but works equally well as soil amendment.

== Uses ==
The main use of bokashi that is described above is to recover value from organic waste by converting it into a soil amendment.

A side effect of diverting organic waste to the soil food web is to divert it away from local waste management streams and their associated costs of collection and disposal. To encourage this, for example most UK local authorities subsidise household bokashi starter kits through a National Home Composting Framework.

Another side effect is to increase the organic carbon content of the amended soil. Some of this is a relatively long-term carbon sink – insofar as the soil ecosystem creates humus – and some is temporary for as long as the richer ecosystem is sustained by measures such as permanent planting, no-till cultivation and organic mulch. An example of these measures is seen at the Ferme du Bec Hellouin in France. Bokashi would therefore have potential uses in enabling communities to speed up the conversion of land from chemical to organic horticulture and agriculture, to regenerate degraded soil, and to develop urban and peri-urban horticulture close to the sources of input.

The anti-pathogenic nature of bokashi is applied to sanitation, in particular to the treatment of faeces. Equipment and supplies to treat pet faeces are sold commercially but do not always give prominence to the hygiene risks. Treatment of human faeces for soil amendment has been extensively studied, notably with the use of biochar (a soil improver in its own right) to remove odours and retain nutrients. Social acceptability is a major obstacle, but niche markets such as emergency aid sanitation, outdoor events and temporary workplaces may develop the technology into a disruptive innovation.

== See also ==
- Korean natural farming
