= Gongpit =

A gongpit was the pit of a gong, an early English word for a place to urinate and defecate.

It may refer to:

- cesspit
- outhouse
- pit toilet
- latrine
