= Jadam =

Offshoot of Korean natural farming

Jadam (Korean: 자닮) is an organic fertilizer and pesticide practice used in the Korean natural farming methodogy developed by Youngsang Cho. Jadam is an acronym of a longer phrase jayeoneul dalmeun saramdeul (Korean: 자연을 닮은 사람들) which loosely means 'people who mimick nature'. However, it is most commonly known in English as Jadam.

== Improvements to Korean Natural Farming ==
Youngsang Cho is the son of the creator of Korean natural farming (KNF), Hankyu Cho, but had several criticisms about it. The first, is that KNF is too complicated and too expensive to start. Thus he started Jadam in 1991 in order to try to streamline natural farming for everyone so that it was cheap and easy and still meet the requirements of organic farming.

== Key recipes ==
Jadam Wetting Agent is a soap made from canola oil and potassium hydroxide flakes and distilled water or rain water.

Jadam Herb Solution uses natural herbs from the environment as a natural pesticide.

Jadam Sulfur is a compound made of distilled water, sulfur and caustic soda to treat fungal infections in plants. This may also include caly and azomite and as additives, though these are said not to be necessary.

Jadam Microorganism Solution is used as a fertilizer and also to help with fungal infections. It is a concentrated liquid culture of indigenous microorganisms

Jadam Liquid Fertilizer is a fermented weed tea that is diluted down to help the bring back nutrients to the soil.

== Controversy ==
Jadam has been criticized for deviating from normal methods of organic farming where traditional organic farming discourages using anaerobic processes, saying it does not enhance the fertility of the soil, while Jadam promotes it. Some papers do suggest that anaerobic organisms can be useful for farming by increasing soil organic carbon.

== See also ==
- Korean natural farming
- Compost
- Effective microorganism
- Natural farming
- Soil microbiology
- Soil food web
