= Long drop =

Long drop may refer to:

- Hanging#Long drop, a method of execution by hanging
- Long drop, a synonym for pit latrine
