= Additive =

Additive may refer to:

== Mathematics ==
- Additive function, a function in number theory
- Additive map, a function that preserves the addition operation
- Additive set-function see Sigma additivity
- Additive category, a preadditive category with finite biproducts
- Additive inverse, an arithmetic concept
- Additive prime, a prime number where the sum of its digits is a number which is also a prime number.

== Science ==
- Additive color, as opposed to subtractive color
- Additive model, a statistical regression model
- Additive synthesis, an audio synthesis technique
- Additive genetic effects
- Additive quantity, a physical quantity that is additive for subsystems; see Intensive and extensive properties

== Engineering ==
- Feed additive
- Gasoline additive, a substance used to improve the performance of a fuel, lower emissions or clean the engine
- Oil additive, a substance used to improve the performance of a lubricant
- Weakly additive, the quality of preferences in some logistics problems
- Polymer additive
- Pit additive, a material aiming to reduce fecal sludge build-up and control odor in pit latrines, septic tanks and wastewater treatment plants
- Biodegradable additives

== Other uses ==
- Additive case, one of the grammatical cases in Estonian
- Food additive, any substance added to food to improve flavor, appearance, shelf life, etc.
- Additive rhythm, a larger period of time constructed from smaller ones
