= Black fungus =

Black fungus may refer to:

- Mucormycosis, an infection of sinuses, brain, lungs or other areas informally known as "black fungus" and sometimes associated with COVID-19
- Wood ear, several species of edible fungus known as black fungus
- Boletus aereus, an edible mushroom known as ontto beltza (black fungus) in Basque
- Black yeast, a group of slow-growing microfungi with melanin in their cell walls

== See also ==
- Black fungus beetle, a species of darkling beetle
- Black fungus moth, a moth found in the United States
- Black fungus gnat, (Asindulum nigrum), a species of fly
- Black mold
