= Korean natural farming =

Agricultural method

Korean Natural Farming (KNF; Korean: 한국식 자연농법) is an organic agricultural method that was created by Hankyu Cho in the 1960s. It takes advantage of indigenous microorganisms (IMO) (bacteria, fungi, nematodes, and protozoa) to produce rich soil that yields high output without the use of herbicides or pesticides.

KNF emphasizes self-sufficiency by limiting external inputs and relying on recycled farm waste to produce biologically active inputs. While this practice has grown in popularity, scientific evidence of the benefits of KNF is relatively limited.

== Early Life ==
Hankyu Cho (1935–2025), born in 1935 in Suwon, Gyeonggi Province, Korea, started farming when he was just 13 years and later attended Suwon Agricultural High School. Cho completed his high school education late, at the age of twenty-nine, due to the Korean War. He chose to not attend college because it differed from the farming methods he had learned from his experience in nature and wanted to learn together with like-minded colleagues.

In 1961, he started a rural development movement with Byeong-gyu Kim led by Geongwoo Lee in Hyangnam, Hwaseong, Gyeonggi-do, South Korea, and developed a farm in the Sanan (Yamagishi) style. To ensure the continuation of their collaboration, these three people held a joint wedding ceremony with their respective younger sisters. In 1965, he went to Japan for three years as an agriculture research student and studied the natural farming methods of the three teachers: Miyozo Yamagishi (Japanese: 山岸 巳代蔵), Kinshi Shibata (柴田 欣志) and Yasushi Oinoue (大井上 康).

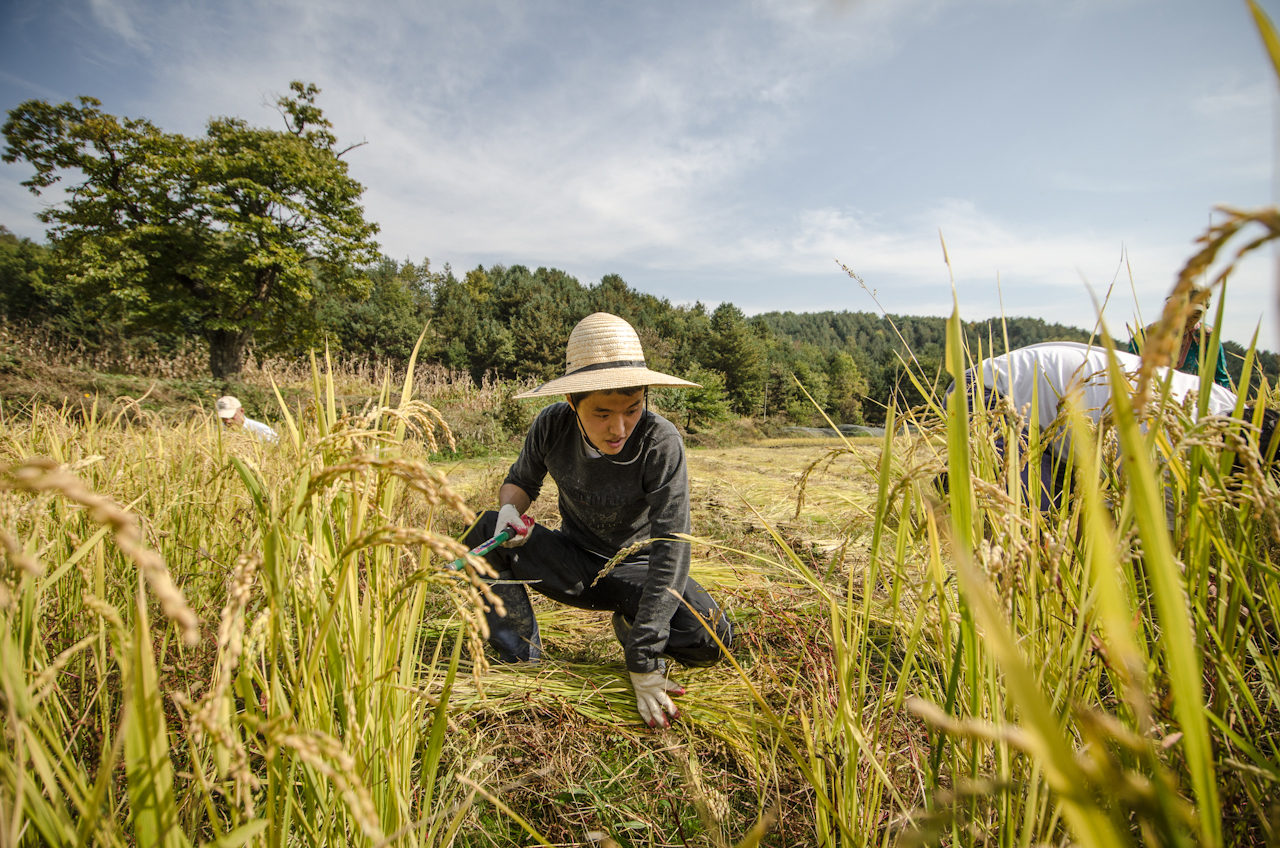
Young man helps harvest rice by hand at a natural farm in Hongcheon Province, South Korea.

== Creation of Korean Natural Farming ==
In the late 1960s, upon his return to Korea, Cho combined his newly acquired knowledge with traditional Korean farming methods and fermentation methods (e.g., as used in Korean foods such as kimchi) and gradually invented what is now called Korean Natural Farming. He put it into practice by setting up a "Labour-Saving Abundant Harvesting Study Group" in 1966. He opened the Natural Farming Life School and Research Farm in Goesan County, North Chungcheong Province, in 1995. He established the Evergreen Agricultural Association and became the president of the Korean Natural Farming Association in 1989.

From 1992 onward, Cho contributed to the 21-part article in the "Modern Agriculture" magazine (Japanese: 現代農業), published in Japan. He also published The Natural Farming of Hankyu Cho in 1992 which was translated in several different languages. Cho published Saving Indigenous Microorganisms (Japanese edition) in 1993 and "Soil Must Live for the Table to Thrive" in 1994. He published Korean Natural Farming: Indigenous Microorganisms and Vital Power of Crop/Livestock by Hankyu Cho& Atsushi Koyama (English edition) in 1997. To spread Korean Natural Farming (KNF) overseas, he travelled to around 30 countries and people there call him "Master Cho". Cho published more two books afterward, All About Heavenly Green Juice (Japanese edition) in 1998 and Making Natural Farming Materials (Korean edition) in 2000. Hoon Park brought KNF to Hawaii from South Korea where, as a missionary, he noticed KNF commercial piggeries with virtually no odour.

In 2008, he renamed his natural farming school and lab to "Cho Han-kyu Global Village Natural Farming Research Institute", or Janong Natural Farming Institute.

In 2019, Cho went to Perris (CA), Williams (OR), and Rochester (WA), the United States to meet his students and discuss about KNF.

== Awards and Honours ==
Awarded the Sektap Industrial Medal, recipient of the Korea-Japan International Environmental Award (The Asian Environmental Awards), jointly established by the Chosun Ilbo and Japan's Mainishi Shimbun, awarded the Zhengzhou Friendship Award (China), the Jilin Province Friendship Award (China), the Excellent Foreign Expert Award by the Yanbian Korean Autonomous Prefecture (China) and Recopient The Dosan Education Award.

== Principles ==
The fundamental insight of KNF is to strengthen the biological functions of each aspect of plant growth in order to increase the productivity and nutrition. Biology thereby reduces or eliminates the need for chemical interventions, whether to protect against predation or competition with other plants. For example, the metabolism of indigenous microorganisms (IMOs) produces complete proteins, while insects prefer incomplete proteins..

KNF avoids the use of manure, thereby reducing the chance of transferring pathogens from the manure back into the food production chain, although in nitrogen-poor conditions adding manure can increase yield.

- Use the nutrients contained within the seeds
- Use indigenous microorganisms (IMO)
- Maximize inborn potential with fewer inputs
- Avoid commercial fertilizers
- Avoid tilling
- No use of livestock-waste

== Indigenous microorganisms ==
Potential benefits include increased rates of soil organic matter decomposition, increases in nutrient availability, improved plant yield, a reduction in pathogenic microorganisms and an increase in plant defenses. KNF uses aerobic microorganisms.

Beneficial microorganisms can significantly suppress fungal pathogen activity in crops of mildly susceptible Rhododendron cultivars, but highly susceptible cultivars may even be harmed. IMOs can reduce initial yield losses when transitioning from conventional to organic farming, by accelerating soil recovery. Soils depleted by the use of insecticides, fungicides and herbicides may have reduced soil microorganisms.

A healthy rhizosphere contains some 7 million microorganisms per hectare. Its rhizome contains diverse species and a relatively small concentration of microorganisms that damage plant life and a relatively large amount of plant secretions. Mold constitutes 70–75%, bacteria 20–25% and small animals the rest. The microorganisms contain approximately 70 kg of carbon and 11 kg of nitrogen, similar to the amount of nitrogen typically applied as fertilizer.

Examples of microorganism reproduction
	Minutes per generation	Generations per day	Temperature	Proliferation per day
Lactic acid bacteria	38	38	25	2.5 × 10^{11}
Coliform bacillus	18	85	37	3 × 10^{23}
Free nitrogen fixation bacteria	110	13	25	8 × 10^{3}
Hay bacillus	31	46	30	6 × 10^{13}
Photosynthetic bacteria	144	10	30	1 × 10^{3}
Yeast fungus	120	12	30	4 × 10^{3}

=== Soil nutrient cycling ===
Nutrients are taken up and deposited in a natural cycle unless disrupted by human intervention. As plants decay, "detrital" nitrogen and phosphorus are returned to the soil. Soil fungus and bacteria absorb those nutrients. The fungus and bacteria are consumed by fungal and bacterial-feeding nematodes, respectively. Those nematodes are in turn consumed by omnivorous predatory nematodes. At each stage, some inorganic nitrogen and phosphorus is returned to the soil and is absorbed by the plant.

=== Bacteria and fungi ===
Three types of bacteria common in KNF include lactic acid bacteria, purple bacteria, Bacillus subtilis and yeast.

=== Mycorrhizae ===
Mycorrhizae are "fungus roots", a mutualistic association between a fungus (Myco) such as Aspergillus oryzae and plant roots (rhiza). This provides an interface between plants and soil. The fungus grows into the roots of crops and out into the soil, increasing the root system many thousand-fold. The fungi use their enzymes to convert soil nutrients into a form that crops can use and turn plant carbohydrates into soil amendments, "sequestering" carbon. Miles of mycorrhizae can be found in a single ounce of soil. Mycorrhizal soil inoculation increases soil carbon accumulation by depositing glomalin, which increases soil structure by binding organic matter to mineral particles. Glomalin gives soil its tilth (texture), buoyancy and water absorption ability. Biochar (charcoal) shelters mycorrhizae in myriad, tiny holes. Other mycorrhizal impacts include enhanced water uptake, reduced water needs (increased drought resistance), increased pathogen resistance, and overall increased plant vigor.

=== Nematodes ===
Nematodes such as the reniform nematode Rotylenchulus reniformis are often seen as harmful to agriculture and are a frequent target of pesticides. However, KNF asserts that 99% of nematodes are beneficial and even consume parasitic nematodes. Herbivorous, fungivorous, bacterivorous, and omnivorous nematodes are important participants in nutrient cycling.

Tillage and other soil management practices affect nematode variety and populations. Conservation tillage benefits bacterivores and fungivores, but the structure index (SI) is not different between cover cropping and fallow fields. In one experiment, simple no-till and strip-till failed to show increases in soil food web structure over two years but did after six years. In the greenhouse, green manure increased omnivorous and predatory populations. Strip-till of sunn hemp cover crop followed by mulching soil surface periodically with sunn hemp residues enhanced SI within 2 cropping cycles.

== Stages of plant development ==
KNF posits three primary stages of plant growth. Each stage requires a different balance of nutrients.

=== Vegetative growth ===
In the vegetative growth phase, the plant extends its roots, branches and foliage. The key nutrient in this stage is nitrogen. KNF prefers the use of a preparation of fish amino acids for this phase.

=== Flowering/reproduction ===
After the plant has reached sufficient size, the plant diverts its energy into making flowers to attract pollinators. The key nutrients in this stage are calcium and phosphorus. KNF prefers the use of a preparation of fermented plant juice and other amendments for this phase.

=== Fruiting ===
After flowering is complete, the plant shifts its focus to bringing its fruit to full ripeness. Calcium enhances the size and sweetness of the plant and its fruit. KNF prefers the use of a preparation of pulverized eggshells in BRV (brown rice vinegar) for this phase.

== Use of Amendments and Fermentation ==
KNF uses a variety of amendments and fermentation methods either to directly enhance plant growth or to enhance IMO proliferation. Note: all water first stands in an open container for several days to allow chlorine and any other volatiles to escape. Amendments are diluted 500–1000:1 for use.

=== Fermented items ===
KNF ferments a variety of materials for use in different contexts. Fermented products are produced in glass or ceramic (not metal or plastic) containers filled to 2/3–3/4 of their capacity and covered with porous paper or cloth. Brown sugar or jaggery (BS/J) is used as a fermentation agent. KNF does not use molasses, which contains excess moisture. Fermentation takes place in a dark, cool area and the results must be refrigerated or kept in a cool environment. The ideal temperature for fermentation is 23–25 °C (73–77 °F).

==== Fermented fruit juice ====
Fermented fruit juice (FFJ) uses the juice of locally-grown fruits with relatively high sugar content, such as banana, papaya, mango, grape, melon, or apple. FFJ from grapes and/or citrus should be used only on crops of grapes or citrus, respectively.

FFJ is diced or mashed fruit diluted 0.65:1 with water and 1:1 with BS/J, fermented for 4–8 days with periodic stirring.

==== Fermented plant juice ====
Fermented plant juice (FPJ) allows material produced by successful plants to be reincorporated into other plants. When BS/J is combined with plant material, plant juices are secreted via osmosis and microbes present on the plant material begin to break down the sugars and create ethanol. This weak alcoholic solution extracts plant components including chlorophyll. FPJ uses young sections of a fast-growing weeds that flourish in/around the fields that are undergoing cultivation or the plants to be cultivated there, harvested in the morning after a dry day. Rain may wash away microbes from the plant, inhibiting proper fermentation, and before sunrise, plant chemistry is more ideal for FPJ. Purslane and comfrey have proven effective choices, as have dropwort, mugwort, watercress, angelica, bamboo shoots, sweet potato vines, beans, pumpkin, and seaweeds.

Layers of chopped plants alternate in 1-inch layers with BS/J. Pressure applied after each layer appropriately minimizes the amount of air.

After 7–10 days, liquid extraction from the mixture has peaked and the remaining solids must be strained from the result.

FPJ is not helpful in the presence of high precipitation and/or high nitrogen conditions.

==== Fish amino acids ====
Fish amino acids (FAA) provide nitrogen to enhance vegetative growth. Fish heads, guts, bones, etc. (preferably tuna or other blue-backed fish), crushed to separate flesh and bone are fermented with an equal amount of BS/J.

Two to three teaspoons of IMO3 can dissolve any fat that develops on the surface. The top layer is a mixture of BS/J, IMO4, OHN, mineral A, and rice straw.

Fermentation generally takes 7–10 days.

==== Kohol amino acid ====
Kohol amino acid (KAA) are made from the kohol or golden apple snail (Pomacea canaliculata). Pomacea canaliculata is an introduced pest in the Philippines that proliferates in rice paddies and consumes young rice seedlings. Proper water management and transplanting the rice seedlings can mitigate its effects. Due to its high protein content (12%), kohol may be used to manufacture a crop amendment referred to as kohol amino acid (KAA), as an alternative to FAA in inland regions who do not have access to affordable fish materials. The kohol has to be removed from the rice paddy anyway.

The kohol are fermented in the usual way by diluting with BS/J and water and adding IMO3, after boiling to kill the animals and separate them from their shells. Fermentation takes 7–10 days after which remaining solids are removed. During storage, additional BS/J is added to nourish the IMO.

==== Maltose ====
KNF maltose is made from sprouted barley (malt). The sprouts are then crushed and repeatedly soaked and separated from water. The malt then rises to the surface and is separated from the water and fermented.

==== Oriental herbal nutrients ====
Oriental herbal nutrients (OHN) are fermented from unwashed, dried Angelica gigas, cinnamon bark and licorice root Glycyrrhiza glabra along with garlic and ginger.

===== Preparation and storage =====
While each herb is fermented separately, the results are combined for use, at the ratio of 2 parts angelica to 1 part of each of the other four.

The material can be fermented 5 times, removing 2/3 of the liquid after each cycle.

Ginger and garlic must be crushed (not ground) to aid fermentation. One herb is mixed with rice wine in equal parts and fermented for 1–2 days. BS/J equal to the amount of herb is added and the mix fermented for 5–7 days. Soju, vodka or another distilled (30–35%) alcohol equal to half of the mixture is added and the mix is fermented for 14 days.

==== Fermented mixed compost ====
Fermented mixed compost (FMC) is the result of applying KNF techniques to turn familiar compost materials into IMO-rich material with readily available nutrients.

In the late fall, bacterial activity subsides and fermenting microbes flourish, producing sugar and the best environment for FMC.

A shady, sheltered location with good drainage on an earthen floor provides the best environment. The minimum batch size is 500 kg, to optimize fermentation.

FMC includes at least one item each from the garden (fallen leaves or fruits), rice field (rice bran, straw), field litter from oil cake or bean cake, and ocean (seaweed, fish waste). The bulk of the material is high-protein animal matter with added plant matter. During fermentation, periodic turning is used to keep temperatures below 50 °C. Excess heat or moisture can produce an unpleasant/foul smell, signaling that the batch is ruined.

Wet compost mixes IMO4 with oil cake, fish waste, bone meal, and bean oil cake and water to reach 60% moisture level (damp enough that the material maintains its shape when squeezed by hand). The mixture produces hormones such as auxin (from yeast and filamentous fungus) gibberellins from red fungus and cytokines from germs and yeast.

Dry compost ferments the same ingredients except water with commercial organic fertilizer for 7–14 days.

==== Rice bran/rapeseed ====
Another approach surrounds a dampened 10:1 rice bran/tree leaf mixture with a 30:4;2:1:1 mix of rapeseed oil residue/fish waste/bone meal/crab shell/bean cake oil mix, amended with KNF inputs and dampened to reach 50–60% moisture content. The mixture is covered with rice straw sprayed with WSP or biochar.

==== Lactic acid bacteria ====
Lactic acid bacteria (LAB) are anaerobic. In the absence of oxygen, they metabolize sugar into lactic acid. LAB improve soil ventilation, promoting rapid growth of fruit trees and leaf vegetables.

LAB ferment "rice wash water" (water that has been used to wash rice), producing a sour smell when complete, then diluted and fermented again with 3-10: 1 with raw (preferred) or pasteurized milk. and fermented a third time after removing flotsam and jetsam and diluting with BS/J 1:1.

Combining LAB with FPJ increases effectiveness.

== Converting Minerals for Plant Absorption ==
KNF provides techniques for converting essential minerals such as calcium, phosphorus, and potassium into a form suitable for absorption by plants, by making them water-soluble. Many inorganic mineral sources cannot be processed by plants. The resulting solutions may contain allergens.

==== Water-soluble calcium ====
Calcium (Ca) is a common substance. However, the majority exists in the form of calcium carbonate (CaCO_{3}), which cannot be directly absorbed by plants.

Egg, clam, or other shells can be turned into an excellent source of bio-available, water-soluble calcium (WSCA). Adequate Ca prevents overgrowth, firms fruit, prolongs durability, promotes the absorption of phosphoric acid, helps crops to accumulate and utilize nutrients, is the major component in forming cell membranes, enables smooth cell division, and removes harmful substances by binding with organic acids.

Signs of Ca deficiency include underdeveloped roots, discolored, dry leaves, empty bean pods, poor ripening, soft flesh, and insufficient fragrance. Leafy vegetables may contract Rhizoctonia, while root vegetables become spongy/hollow, lack sugar and fragrance and lack durability in storage. Rice and barley may display low starch, lack of luster and fragrance, and low resistance.

WSCA is produced by grilling and crushing cleaned egg shells and steeping them in BRV until no bubbles are present. The bubbles indicate that the vinegar is reacting with organic matter to produce CO_{2}.

==== Water-soluble calcium phosphate ====
Calcium phosphate is soluble in acids, but insoluble in water. Bones including FAA leftovers can be converted into a source of bio-accessible calcium, phosphate and other minerals by boiling them to create a traditional bone broth. The (edible) broth is removed from the bone residue and the bones are burnt to charcoal at low heat. The bones are diluted with 10x BRV and steeped until the bubbling stops (7–10 days).

==== Water-soluble phosphoric acid ====
Phosphoric acid makes up part of the cell nucleus and reproductive system. Phosphoric acid is involved in photo phosphorylation and electron transport in photosynthesis, anabolite transport and in protein synthesis.

Deficiency hinders cell division and reproduction. Symptoms first appear on the petiole and veins of older leaves. New leaves grow slowly and are dark in color. Flowering is reduced

KNF water-soluble phosphoric acid (WSPA), is made by burning phosphoric acid-rich sesame stems into charcoal. The charcoal is soaked in aerated water to dissolve the acid.

==== Water-soluble potassium ====
Although soils that have been treated with lime may have substantial potassium (K), it may be in an insoluble form. Potassium deficiency can also occur in sandy soil which has less humus.

K does not become part of plant structure, but acts to regulate water balances, nutrient, and sugar movement and drives starch and protein synthesis and legume nitrogen fixation. Prior to fruiting, its principal function is to grow meristematic tissues. K promotes the synthesis of carbon dioxide fixing enzymes, decreases the diffusive resistance of CO_{2} in the leaf and activates various enzyme reaction systems.

Potassium is highly mobile in plants. Leaf potassium content decreases rapidly during fruiting because the fruit requires substantial K.

Symptoms of K deficiency include lower growth rates, smaller fruit and seed sizes, reduced root systems, disease and winterkill susceptibility and lower moisture and nitrogen absorption and content. Chlorosis starts from old leaves after K moves to other plant parts. Their edges become yellowish-brown and appear as a spot in the middle of leaves in some plants.

Water-soluble potassium (WSK) is made from steeping bite-sized pieces of tobacco stems in water for 7 days and diluting the result 30:1 with water.

==== Seawater ====
Lower-salinity surface seawater and/or brackish water carries beneficial microbes. Fermenting this water (diluted 30:1 with freshwater and again 200:1 with rice-washed water), OHN and mugwort/dropwort diluted FPJ, uncovered, for a few days increases microbial populations.

==== Biochar ====
Biochar is a porous charcoal that has been designed to produce high surface area per unit volume and small amounts of residual resins. Biochar serves as a catalyst that enhances plant uptake of nutrients and water. Its surface area and porosity enable it to adsorb or retain nutrients and water and provide a microorganism habitat.

==== Bacterial mineral water ====
Bacteria Mineral Water (BMW) steeps granite, limestone, basalt, elvan and other basaltic rocks along with IMO4 to leach minerals from the rocks, recirculating the output with refreshed IMO4 to increase mineral concentrations.

Silicon can be pulled out of basaltic rock with oxygenated water. O_{2} reacts with the Si out of the rock to form SiO_{2} (glass). The rock becomes a reddish dirt. The significant amounts of reduced iron, Fe(II), and manganese, Mn(II), present in basaltic rocks provide potential energy sources for bacteria.

BMW are abundant minerals and trace elements. It promotes plant growth, improves storabilit, and deodorizes manure.

== Soil Amendments ==
In KNF existing soil is amended by a mixture of cultured microorganisms, biochar and growth media. Microorganisms accelerate the conversion of organic compounds and other nutrients from dead plants and animals into a readily-absorbable form. Outputs can include antibiotics, enzymes and lactic acids that can suppress diseases and promote healthy soil conditions.

The basic approach proceeds in four steps, each of which produces a usable amendment. The process takes 3 to 4 weeks.

==== Microorganism recruitment (IMO1) ====
A cloth-covered wooden or cardboard box containing fairly dry steamed rice and a few bamboo leaves in a shady area protected from rain left 4–5 days attracts and nourishes local microorganisms. Microorganisms from a somewhat higher altitude than the target fields tend to be more robust. Successful recruitment is indicated by the presence of a white fuzz. Black, green or other prominent colors indicate unwanted strains, requiring a restart. Mixing cultures from different locations, sun exposures and weather increases diversity.

Other ways to collect IMO include filling the hollow core of a freshly-cut bamboo stump with rice or placing the collection box in a rice paddy after harvest.

==== BS/J nourishment (IMO2) ====
Diluting the "inhabited" rice with an equal amount of BS/J or jaggery provides nourishment for microorganism growth. After the microorganisms consume the sugar (7 days) the result can be used immediately or stored.

==== Mill run of wheat (IMO3) ====
A mix of 40 millilitres (1.4 imp fl oz; 1.4 US fl oz) of IMO2 with 42.5 mL of BRV, 42.5 mL of FPJ and 21.2 mL of OHN with 30 pounds of wheat mill run or rice bran dampened with 20 litres (5.3 US gal) of water provides a medium for further IMO culturing. The result can be extended with 4 litres (1.1 US gal) of biochar. The highly porous biochar provides superior habitat for IMO flourishing and retains carbon in the soil.

IMO3 is fermented in 12-inch high shaded furrows for 7 days, sheltered from rain and covered with straw mats or gunny bags, turning as needed to ensure that its internal temperature remains around 110 °F (43 °C). The resulting mixture's moisture level should be approximately 40%.

Alternative dilutants are rice bran or rice flour.

==== Soil (IMO4) ====
Diluting IMO3 with an equal amount of soil, half from the field and half from a locally fertile area allows the microorganisms to reach a larger area.

==== Alternative mixture (IMO-A) ====
Another source recommends an alternative mixture as follows, for each hectare:

Final mixture
Ingredient	Quantity
IMO – 2	1,250 mL
FPJ	1,250 mL
OHN	1,250 mL
BRV	1,250 mL
LAB	750 mL
WSCP	750 mL
FAA	750 mL
Biochar	125 kg
Soil	1250 kg
Salt Water	7.5 L
Water	500 L
Farmyard manure	2,500 kg

== Applications ==
=== Soil enrichment ===
IMO3 or IMO4 can be distributed thinly on a field, covered with a layer of mulch to retain moisture and provide a dark environment for further IMO growth.

IMO-A should be applied 7 days before planting, 2–3 hours before sunset and a few hours after mixing. For unproductive fields, apply 14 days before planting.

LAB (diluted 5-10000:1) solubilizes phosphate in phosphate-accumulated soil and encourages phosphate decomposition.

Sun-dried salt can be applied to soil at 5 kg for every 10 acres.

==== Fertilizer ====
FMC applied 2–3 hours before sunset on a cloudy day and covered with soil/mulch (or lightly plowed with a 1 to 2 inch rotary hoe adds nutrients and microorganisms to depleted soil. Alternatively, FMC can produce liquid fertilizer by placing it in a cloth bag and immersing in water with other KNF inputs.

=== Foliar feeding ===
Other inputs are applied directly via foliar feeding to crops at different stages of crop development. Foliar delivery reduce the amount of nutrients required, since they are delivered directly to the plant. Young seedlings with smaller root systems can still be effectively nourished during the reproductive stage when root activity decreases. Foliar nutrient uptake during the reproductive stage is increased due to a decrease in root activity, and the ability to modify the nutrient inputs accordingly.

Nutrients such as phosphorus, potassium, and micronutrients bind with the soil complex easily, making them unavailable for crops. More soluble nutrients such as nitrogen easily leach from the soil and end up polluting groundwater or streams.

==== Seeds/seedlings ====
KNF prepares seeds for planting by soaking them in a mixture of 2 parts FPJ, 2 parts BRV, 1 part OHN in 1000 parts water.

Soak fast-germinating seeds such as turnip, cabbage, and bean for 2 hours.

Soak average-germinating seeds such as cucumber, melon, lotus, and squash for 4 hours.

Soak slow-germinating seeds such as rice, barley, and tomato for 7 hours.

Soak other seeds such as potato, ginger, garlic, and taro for 0.5–1 hours.

Underdeveloped seedlings can be treated with 1 mL of FAA added to this mix. Overdeveloped seedlings can be treated with 1 mL of WSCA added to the mix.

==== Vegetative growth ====
Initially, FPJ (diluted 1000:1) from mugwort (Artemisia vulgaris) and bamboo shoots help crops become cold-resistant and grow fast and strong. Later arrowroot and water/marsh plants with a firm stem help provide nitrogen (diluted 800 1000:1).

Nitrogen-rich FAA can support vegetative plant growth. For leafy vegetables, it is possible to use FAA continuously to increase yield and improve taste and fragrance. Mackerel amino acids help control mites and the green house whitefly (Trialeurodes vaporariorum).

WSCA sprayed on leaves enhances growth. LAB helps increase fruit and leaf size, but the amount of LAB used should be reduced at later growth stages.

==== Flowering ====
Use FFJ from grape, papaya, mulberry, or raspberry on fruit crops to provide phosporic acid.

Alternatively, apply water-soluble calcium phosphate WCAP (diluted 1:1000) or a mixture of water-soluble phosphorus WPA and WSCA. WSCA helps the plant to accumulate nutrients in flower buds, improving future yields and fruit quality.

Use seawater for seedling treatment of onions, big leeks, and garlic.

==== Fruiting ====
WSCA and FFJ from apple, banana, mango, papaya, peach, and grape enhance flavor and firmness of fruit.

Fermented seawater increase fruit's sugar content and enhance ripening. Fermented seawater prevents and controls anthracnose.

=== Animal husbandry ===
Cultured soil can be used in a piggery or hen house. It converts excrement into soil and thereby allows the piggery to operate without the noxious emissions that have afflicted hog production since agriculture began. With no effluent, the piggery no longer attracts flies and does not require periodic cleaning. No special ventilation is used. Pens are laid with sawdust and wood chips with IMO to break down the manure. Hogs are fed agricultural waste.

LAB mixed with FPJ and optionally WSCA can be used as drinking water for livestock, to help with digestion.

Fermented seawater mixed with BRV and WSC and fed to chickens can be used to prevent feather loss in chickens during the summer.

=== Composting ===
LAB can reduce damage to compost by neutralizing ammonia gas produced by immature compost.

=== Pest management ===
FPJ and/or FFJ diluted with rice bran and water can preferentially attract pests away from crops.

Aphids can be controlled with 0.7 litres of soap water mixed with 20 litres of water. Alternatively, use HPW. Apply to the plant as a foliar spray.

To control mites, dilute soap water 40x with water. Alternatively, use HPW.

=== Insect attractants ===
KNF insect attractants are non-toxic methods of pest control during the egg-laying season.

AIA and FIA devices are installed at the height of fruits or leaves in and around the field. They are usually employed during the peak of the reproductive growth of fruit-bearing plants and during the height of vegetative growth of leafy vegetables.

==== Aromatic ====
An aromatic insect attractant (AIA) is a mixture of alcohol and rice wine or brandy and FFJ or FPJ (diluted 300:1) in an open container hung when pests lay their eggs.

==== Fluorescent ====
A fluorescent insect attractant (FIA) uses a zinc sheet bent in an "L" shape hung so that the shorter side acts as a roof and the other side hangs vertically. A fluorescent light hangs vertically from the corner of the sheet to attract pests. A water-filled basin containing a few drops of gasoline/kerosene hangs underneath the light to kill insects that alight.

=== Soap water and hot pepper water ===
Soap water (SoWa) and hot-pepper water (HPW) are used for controlling aphids and mites. When soap water is applied as a foliar spray, sunlight evaporates the water. Evaporation, heat loss, and condensation kill the pests.

SoWa is chopped lye soap, boiled in water to make a thick soup and then diluted.

HPW is chopped hot peppers, boiled and diluted.

== Experience ==
=== United States ===
In Hawaii, crop productivity increased two-fold with the use of KNF, while reducing water use by 30% and eliminating the use of pesticides. Cane grass proved to be a superior cover crop on degraded Hawaiian fields.

=== South Korea ===
Natural Farming was adopted by the South Korean government after successful trials growing rice in one county, where every farmer followed the practice. They increased yields, saved money on inputs and obtained a price premium. Rivers and coastal waters experienced environmental benefits.

A co-op of 40 strawberry farmers used KNF exclusively in 300 foot-long greenhouses, producing increasing output and obtaining a higher price.

In another experiment, farmers in an entire county used KNF to become self-sufficient, with each farm raising 500 chickens, 20 pigs and five beef cattle.

=== Mongolia ===
In the Gobi Desert in Mongolia, harsh wind and minimal rainfall defeated three attempts to plant trees. With KNF, the trees had a 97% survival rate and as of 2014 had reached 20 feet in height. Corn and barnyard grasses provide livestock feed. Watermelon farming provides a stable income to farmers there.

=== China ===
The Chinese Army feeds its service members using its own resources. For the Beijing Olympics, it brought pigs into the city, setting off violent protests over the odour. It then dispatched two officials to South Korea to study Natural Farming. KNF techniques successfully eliminated the odour. The University of Peking now offers Masters and PhD programs in KNF.

== See also ==
- Compost
- Effective microorganism
- Natural farming
- Soil microbiology
- Soil food web
- Jadam

== Sources ==
- Reddy, Rohini (2011). Sai, D. V. R.; Ismail, Sultan Ahmed (eds.). "Cho's Global Natural Farming" (PDF). South Asia Rural Reconstructio Association.
