= Black mold =

Black mold or black mould may refer to:

- Stachybotrys chartarum, mold common in water-damaged buildings
- Aspergillus niger, the most common mold species of the genus Aspergillus
- Black bread mold (Rhizopus stolonifer), a widely distributed thread-like mucoralean mold commonly found on bread surfaces
- Black Mold (film), a 2023 American psychological horror thriller film
- Black Mold, the alias used by Canadian musician Chad VanGaalen for his 2009 album Snow Blindness Is Crystal Antz
- "Black Mold", the debut single from the Jon Spencer Blues Explosion's 2012 album Meat + Bone
- Black Mould, a comic series in the Rivers of London universe
- "Black Mold", a song by Prince Daddy & the Hyena from Prince Daddy & the Hyena

== See also ==
- Black fungus (disambiguation)
- Mold (disambiguation)
