= Teruo Higa =

Japanese agricultural researcher

- Born: 28 December 1941 (age 84)
- Education: University of the Ryukyus
- Occupations: Professor, University of the Ryukyus Agricultural Research Department of Kyushu University Graduate School
- Known for: Horticulture Microorganism products

Teruo Higa (比嘉 照夫, Higa Teruo; born December 28, 1941) is a professor at the University of the Ryukyus in Okinawa, to the south of the main Japanese archipelago, and grew up there. Following his graduation from the Department of Agriculture, University of the Ryukyus, he took his doctorate from the Agricultural Research Department of Kyushu University Graduate School, eventually returning to join the teaching staff of the University of the Ryukyus as lecturer in 1970, becoming assistant professor two years later. He became Professor of Horticulture in 1982. He pioneered the development of "effective microorganism" products. He is a Master of Health and Nutrition with The Beijing DeTao Masters Academy (DTMA), a high-level, multi-discipline, application-oriented higher education institution in Shanghai, China.

== Positions held by Teruo Higa ==
As of 2013:

- Chairman, Executive Committee of the International Promotion of Nature Farming
- President, Asia-Pacific Natural Agriculture Network (APNAN)
- Director, International Nature Farming Research Center (INFRC)
- Technological Adviser, Japan Flower Association
- Scientific Adviser, Association for the Cleaning of Japan's Water
- Director and Head of the Okinawa Branch, Japan World Health Organization (WHO)
- Director, Earth Environment and Co-Existence Network (NPO)
- Director, Flowers in City Development and Constructions Network (NPO)
- Chairman, Evaluation Committee for the "National Contest of Flowers in City Development and Constructions" (Japan's Ministry of Agriculture, Forestry and Fisheries and Ministry of Land, Infrastructure and Transport-advocated project)
- Others, successive posts in national and prefectural committees

== Books and publications by and about Teruo Higa ==
- (in Japanese) Major publications Use of Microorganisms in Agriculture & Their Positive Effects on *Environmental Safety (Nobunkyo 1991)
- (in Japanese) EM Environmental Revolution (Chief Editor; Sogo Unicom 1994)
- (in Japanese) EM Industrial Revolution (Chief Editor; Sogo Unicom 1997)
- (in Japanese) An Earth Saving Revolution: Solutions to Problems in Agriculture, the Environment and Medicine (Sunmark Publishing, 1993). (in English) (English edition: Sunmark Publishing, 1993)
- (in Japanese) An Earth Saving Revolution II: The Proven Effects of EM Technology (Sunmark Publishing, 1994). (in English) (English edition: Sunmark Publishing, 1998)
- (in Japanese) An Earth Saving Revolution III: The Global Spread of EM Technology (Sunmark Publishing, 1997)
- (in Japanese) The Genuine Century (Co-author; PHP Kenkyusho 1995)
- (in Japanese) Microorganisms Rescue the Civilization (Co-author; Crest Co., 1995)
- (in Japanese) EM: A New Life for Kitchen Garbage (Sunmark Publishing, 1995)
- All About Teruo Higa (Sunmark Publishing, 1998)
- Yomigaeru Mirai (Sunmark Publishing, 2000)
- (in Japanese) EM Medical Revolution (Chief Editor; Sogo Unicom 2000)
- (in Japanese) Wonder of Sosei Sea Salt (Co-author; Sogo Unicom 2001)
- (in Japanese) New Century - EM Environmental Revolution (Chief Editor; Sogo Unicom 2003)
- (in English) Our Future Reborn: EM Technology Changes The World (Sunmark Publishing, 2006)
