= Pit additive =

Material to reduce fecal sludge build-up

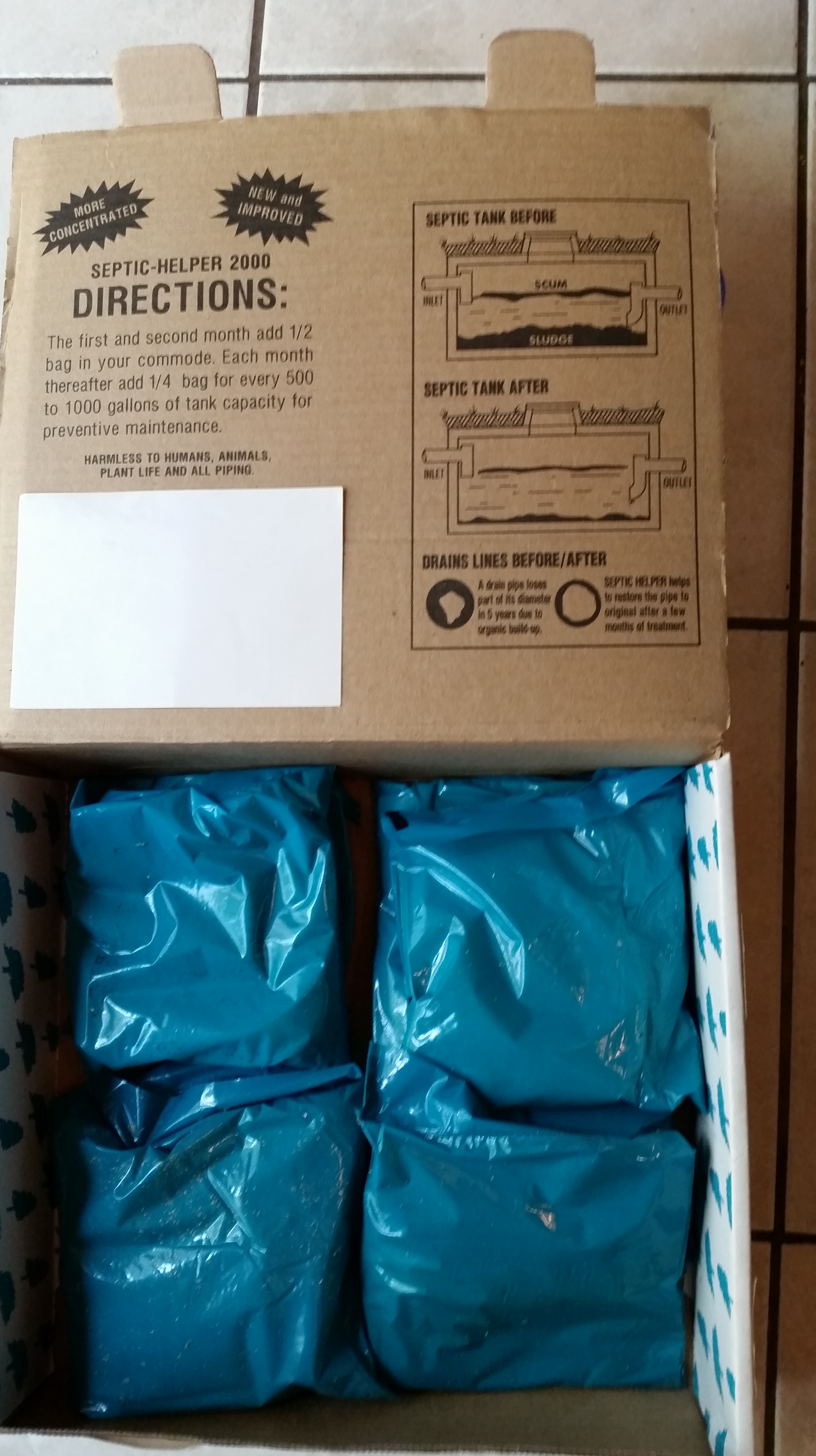
This box of additives is meant for septic tanks. It instructs users to add one of the blue packets of powdered material each month.

Pit additives is a commercially produced material that aims to reduce fecal sludge build-up and control odor in pit latrines, septic tanks and wastewater treatment plants. Manufacturers claim to use effective microorganisms (EM) in their products. Current scientific evidence does not back up most claims made by manufacturers about the benefits. Removing sludge continues to be a problem in pit latrines and septic tanks.

== Background ==
Pit additives are advocated for use in sanitation systems like pit latrines and septic tanks. Additives consist of packages of micro-organisms or enzymes or both. More than 1,200 septic system additives were estimated to be available in the U.S. in 2011. However, very little peer-reviewed and replicated field research exists to confirm the efficacy of biological additives.

=== Claimed benefits ===
Pit additive claims include an increase in speed of the breakdown of sludge, which may also decrease odor. The claim is based on assertions that the additive contains nutrients or certain aerobic (oxygen-breathing) micro-organisms that will break down the sludge. Research, however, finds that these claims are unlikely to be true. The amount of bacteria introduced by pit additives is insignificant compared to the bacteria already present in the pit or septic tank.

== Applications ==
=== Septic tanks ===
Researchers from the U.S. carried out field experiments in 2011 to assess the effect of additives on the performance of 20 septic tanks. These septic tanks served residences at a mobile home park located in Orange County, North Carolina. The researchers distinguished between tanks that were well maintained, poorly maintained and maintained to an intermediate level. "Well maintained" was defined as "de-sludged in the last 2-3 years.: "Poorly maintained" had not been de-sludged for the last 15-20 years. Tanks put in the intermediate category fell somewhere in between.

Only well-maintained septic tanks showed some reduction in sludge build-up. To determine if the reduction could be attributed to pit additives, a follow-up study investigated the impact of three additives on just the well-maintained septic tanks. Overall, the research concluded there was limited evidence of additive impact on the performance of septic tanks. It should be stressed that these field experiments used additives other than EM (effective microorganisms), leaving the results open to the argument that the more varied composition of EM could make such additives more effective than the three additives tested.

The United States Environmental Protection Agency (USEPA) produced a fact sheet on the use of pit additives to improve the performance of septic tank treatment systems. The fact sheet concludes that bacteria and extracellular enzymes do not appear to significantly enhance normal biological decomposition processes in septic tanks. They go on to say that ‘some biological additives have been found to degrade or dissipate septic tank scum and sludge. However, whether this relatively minor benefit is derived without compromising long-term viability of the soil infiltration system has not been demonstrated conclusively’. They noted that some studies suggest that material degraded by additives in the tank actually adds to the suspended solids and other contaminants in the otherwise clarified septic tank effluent.

=== Wastewater treatment plants ===
Proponents claim the additives in wastewater can facilitate reduction in organic load and pathogen removal, leading to significant improvements in effluent quality. They also claim benefits relating to the rate of sludge build-up and odor reduction. One source claims that septic tank additives can reduce hydrogen sulphide and ammonia production. Their reasoning is that additives contain natural’ organisms that prevail over the rather less ‘natural’ organisms that would otherwise dominate conditions in the treatment unit, whether this be a septic tank or some form of aerobic treatment. They even claim that by overcoming the effects of ‘unnatural’ substances such as bleach and other disinfectants, the use of septic tank additives allows septic tanks and other treatment systems to function in conditions that would otherwise have resulted in their becoming ‘dead’ and non-functional.

One short note claims that microorganisms in the additives contain various organic acids due to the presence of lactic acid bacteria. These secrete organic acids, enzymes antioxidants, and metallic chelates thus create an antioxidant environment, which assists in the enhancement of solid-liquid separation, which is the foundation for cleaning water. The authors of the note provide no explanation of how this works.

However, the findings from various studies around the world indicate that:

- There is no reliable evidence that addition of pit additives to wastewater prior to treatment has a significant effect on pathogen concentrations.
- The evidence on the effect of pit additives on settleability of solids and reduction in effluent BOD and suspended solids is mixed. Under some circumstances, it appears that adding pit additives can have some effect on both BOD and SS concentrations but the effect is not large and is not proven.
- The available evidence suggests that any lasting effect of pit additives is dependent on regular application of the microorganisms combined with good maintenance of the treatment technology. This will require (a) a reliable supply chain for the pit additive and (b) management systems that ensure that the pit additive is added regularly and on schedule.

While pit additives can lead to some improvement in effluent quality, it is unlikely that the improvement would be enough to make a difference. Claims that pit additives can make otherwise ‘unsafe’ effluents ‘safe’ is unlikely to be justified.

== Examples ==
=== Australia ===
Australian scientists investigated the effect of additives in a wastewater treatment plant and a number of septic tanks. Their aim was to test the hypothesis that the additive reduces sludge volumes. They found significant reduction in pH levels at the wastewater treatment plant together with improved settlement of sludge but with a significant increase in organic matter (measured as biological oxygen demand). Their results for the septic tanks showed a homogenization of conditions in the tanks after application of septic tank additives, which they suggested was due to domination by a particular type of micro-organism. However, they found no reduction in suspended solids concentration in the effluent and concluded that there were not sufficient changes in sludge volume in the wastewater treatment plant or suspended solids in the septic tanks to indicate a clear benefit from the use of these kinds of additives in wastewater.

=== Orangi Pilot Project in Karachi, Pakistan ===
A project in Karachi, Pakistan called the Orangi Pilot Project (OPP) has been making use of pit additives. The OPP promotes a treatment technology comprising a two-chamber tank. The first of these acts like the first compartment of a septic tank while the second is filled with gravel to provide filtration. It is not clear whether flow through the second compartment is upward or downward. This arrangement has some similarities to baffled reactor designs promoted by the German NGO BORDA, although standard BORDA designs provide more chambers, arranged in series and with all after the first chamber operating in an upward flow mode. The baffled reactor design is one of a number of ‘DEWATS’ (decentralised wastewater treatment systems) wastewater treatment technologies promoted by BORDA. All operate anaerobically and are examples of what might be termed enhanced primary treatment. If maintained well, enhanced primary treatment modules should perform better than a well maintained conventional septic tank but will still produce an effluent with high pathogen levels and relatively high biological oxygen demand and suspended solids concentrations.

The OPP is using the additives to improve the effluent produced at these small treatment plants, including the plant that treats effluent from a nursery in Karachi. It has also supported the installation of several small treatment plants using EM technology in rural Sindh and Punjab. Its partner organization Ali Hasan Mangi Memorial Trust (AHMMT) installed a small sewage treatment unit with additives to treat sewage from 300 houses in the village Khairodero in Larkana District. Another eleven are reported to be functioning and more are planned.

During discussions at the Urban Resource Centre in Karachi in late 2011, the late Parveen Rehman of OPP stated that adding pit additives to the inlet chamber of these treatment facilities had resulted in improved effluent quality and a significant reduction in smell. However, it seems that OPP had not attempted to quantify the improvement and had not made any formal assessment of the effect of the pit additive on effluent quality.
