= Pit latrine =

Toilet that collects human waste in a hole in the ground

- Synonym: Pit toilet, household latrine, long drop
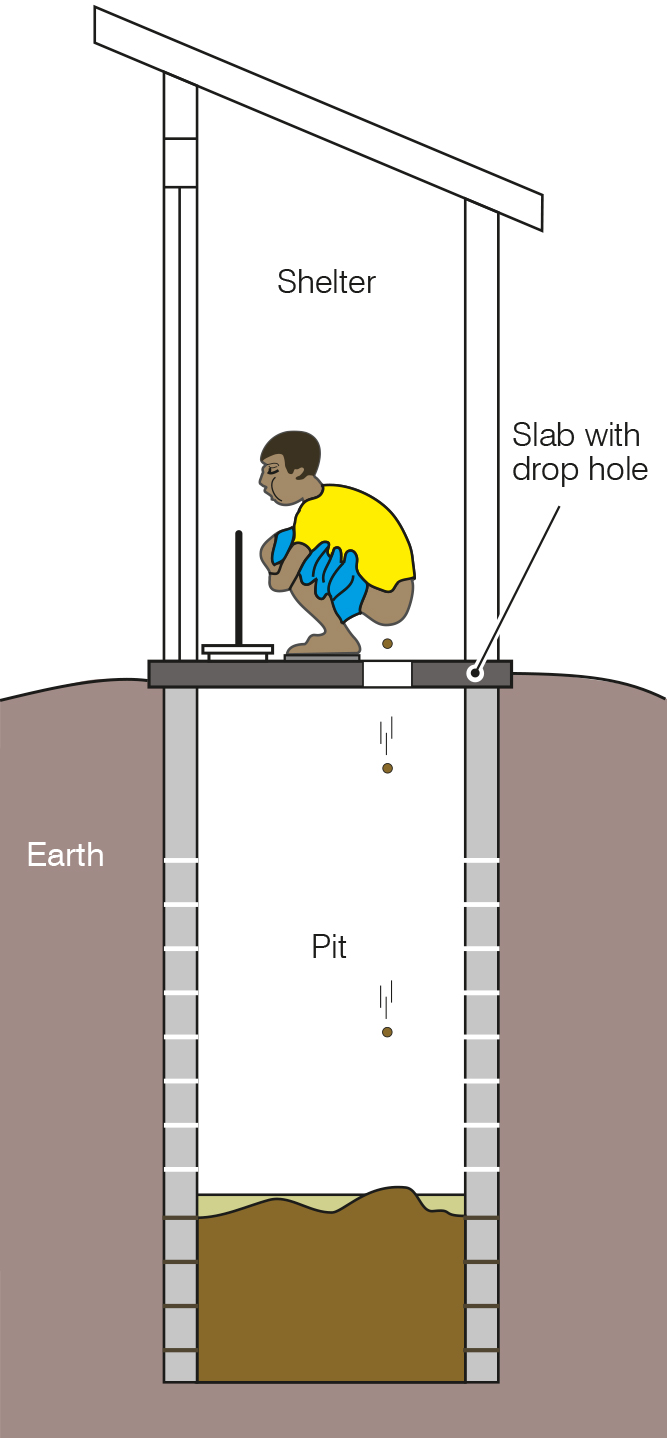
- A simple pit latrine with a squatting pan and shelter
- Position in sanitation chain: User interface, collection and storage (on-site)
- Application level: Household level
- Management level: Household, public, shared
- Inputs: Feces, urine
- Outputs: Fecal sludge
- Types: With or without water seal, single or twin pit
- Construction cost: Cheapest form of basic sanitation
- Maintenance cost: US$2–12/person/year as of 2011 (not including emptying)
- Environmental concerns: Groundwater pollution
- Number of users: 1.8 billion people (2013)

A pit latrine, also known as pit toilet, is a type of toilet that collects human waste in a hole in the ground. Urine and feces enter the pit through a drop hole in the floor, which might be connected to a toilet seat or squatting pan for user comfort. Pit latrines can be built to function without water (dry toilet) or they can have a water seal (pour-flush pit latrine). When properly built and maintained, pit latrines can decrease the spread of disease by reducing the amount of human feces in the environment from open defecation. This decreases the transfer of pathogens between feces and food by flies. These pathogens are major causes of infectious diarrhea and intestinal worm infections. Infectious diarrhea resulted in about 700,000 deaths in children under five years old in 2011 and 250 million lost school days. Pit latrines are a low-cost method of separating feces from people.

A pit latrine generally consists of three major parts: a hole in the ground, a concrete slab or floor with a small hole, and a shelter. The shelter is also called an outhouse. The pit is typically at least three meters (10 ft) deep and one meter (3 ft) across. The hole in the slab should not be larger than 25 cm (10 in) to prevent children falling in. Light should be prevented from entering the pit to reduce access by flies. This may require the use of a lid to cover the hole in the floor when not in use. The World Health Organization recommends that pits be built a reasonable distance from the house, ideally balancing easy access against smell. The distance from water wells and surface water should be at least 10 m (30 ft) to decrease the risk of groundwater pollution. When the pit fills to within 0.5 m (1 1/2 ft) of the top, it should be either emptied or a new pit constructed and the shelter moved or re-built at the new location. Fecal sludge management involves emptying pits as well as transporting, treating and using the collected fecal sludge. If this is not carried out properly, water pollution and public health risks can occur.

A basic pit latrine can be improved in a number of ways. One includes adding a ventilation pipe from the pit to above the structure. This improves airflow and decreases the smell of the toilet. It also can reduce flies when the top of the pipe is covered with mesh (usually made out of fiberglass). In these types of toilets a lid need not be used to cover the hole in the floor. Other possible improvements include a floor constructed so fluid drains into the hole and a reinforcement of the upper part of the pit with bricks, blocks, or cement rings to improve stability. In developing countries the cost of a simple pit toilet is typically between US$25 and $60. Recurring expenditure costs are between US$1.5 and $4 per person per year for a traditional pit latrine, and up to three times higher for a pour flush pit latrine (without the costs of emptying).

As of 2013 pit latrines are used by an estimated 1.77 billion people, mostly in developing countries. About 419 million people (5 percent of the global population) practiced open defecation in 2022, mostly because they have no toilets.

Southern Asia and Sub-Saharan Africa have the lowest access to toilets. The Indian government has been running a campaign called "Swachh Bharat Abhiyan" (Clean India Mission in English) since 2014 in order to eliminate open defecation by convincing people in rural areas to purchase, construct and use toilets, mainly pit latrines. As a result, sanitation coverage in India has increased from just 39% in October 2014 to almost 98% in 2019. It is estimated that 85 million pit latrines have been built due to that campaign as of 2018. Another example from India is the "No Toilet, No Bride" campaign which promotes toilet uptake by encouraging women to refuse to marry men who do not own a toilet.

== Definitions ==
Depending on the region, the term "pit latrine" may be used to denote a toilet that has a squatting pan with a water seal or siphon (more accurately termed a pour-flush pit latrine – very common in South East Asia for example) or simply a hole in the ground without a water seal (also called a simple pit latrine) – the common type in most countries in sub-Saharan Africa. Whilst a dry toilet can be with or without urine diversion, a pit latrine is almost always without urine diversion. The key characteristic of a pit latrine is the use of a pit, which infiltrates liquids into the ground and acts as a device for storage and very limited treatment.

Pit latrines are sometimes also referred to as "dry toilets". However, some pit latrines do use water for flushing and are therefore not a "dry toilet". Dry toilets is an overarching term used for several types of toilets, and only refers to the type of user interface, not the storage or treatment part.

=== Improved or unimproved sanitation ===
A pit latrine may or may not count towards the Millennium Development Goals (MDG) target of increasing access to sanitation for the world's population, depending on the type of pit latrine: A pit latrine without a slab is regarded as unimproved sanitation and does not count towards the target. A pit latrine with a slab, a ventilated improved pit latrine and a pour flush pit latrine connected to a pit or septic tank are counted as being "improved sanitation" facilities as they are more likely to hygienically separate human excreta from human contact.

== Design considerations ==
=== Size of the drop hole ===
The user positions themself over the small drop hole during use. The size of the feces drop hole in the floor or slab should not be larger than 25 cm (10 in) to prevent children falling in. Light should be prevented from entering the pit to reduce access by flies.

=== Lids on the drop hole or toilet seat ===
A lid on the drop hole keeps light out of the pit and helps to stop flies and odors entering the toilet's superstructure. The lid can be made from plastic or wood and is used to cover the hole in the floor when the pit latrine is not in use. In practice, such a lid is not commonly used for squatting type pit latrines but only for sitting type pit latrines with a toilet seat.

=== Squatting pan or toilet seat ===
On top of the drop hole there can either be nothing (this is the simplest form of a pit latrine) or there can be a squatting pan, seat (pedestal) or bench which can be made of concrete, ceramic, plastic or wood.

=== Shelter ===
A shelter, shed, small building or "super-structure" houses the squatting pan or toilet seat and provides privacy and protection from the weather for the user. Ideally, the shelter or small building should have handwashing facilities available inside or on the outside (e.g. supplied with water from a rainwater harvesting tank on the roof of the shelter) although this is rarely the case in practice. In the shelter, anal cleansing materials (e.g. toilet paper) and a solid waste bin should also be available. A more substantial structure may also be built, commonly known as an outhouse.

=== Locating the pit ===
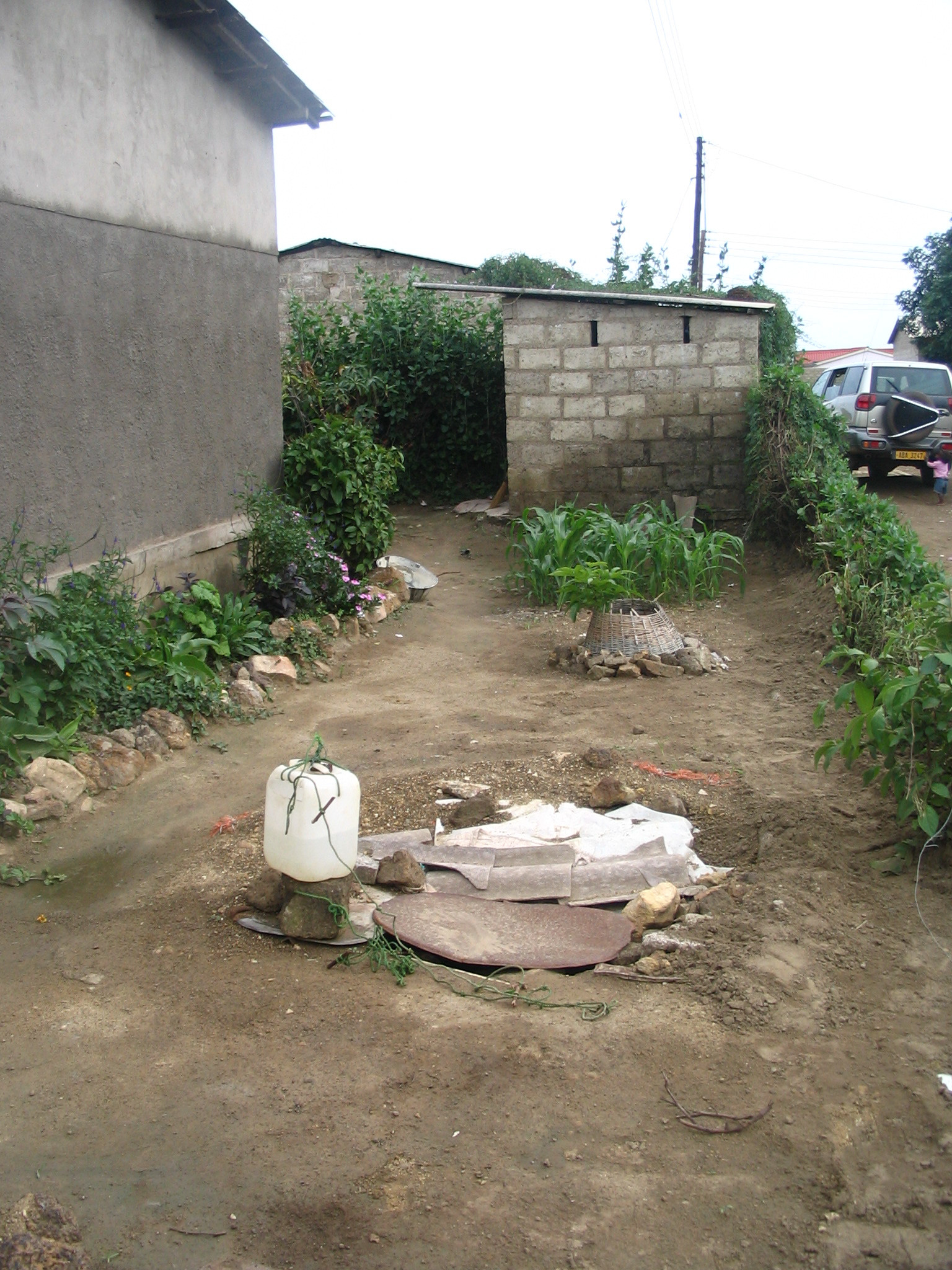
Common problem: water well (foreground) is in close proximity to the pit latrine (brick building at the back), leading to groundwater pollution (example from Lusaka, Zambia).

Liquids leach from the pit and pass the unsaturated soil zone (which is not completely filled with water). Subsequently, these liquids from the pit enter the groundwater where they may lead to groundwater pollution. This is a problem if a nearby water well is used to supply groundwater for drinking water purposes. During the passage in the soil, pathogens can die off or be absorbed significantly, mostly depending on the travel time between the pit and the well. Most, but not all pathogens die within 50 days of travel through the subsurface.

The degree of pathogen removal strongly varies with soil type, aquifer type, distance and other environmental factors. For this reason, it is difficult to estimate the safe distance between a pit and a water source – a problem that also applies to septic tanks. Detailed guidelines have been developed to estimate safe distances to protect groundwater sources from pollution from on-site sanitation. However, these are mostly ignored by those building pit latrines. In addition to that, household plots are of a limited size and therefore pit latrines are often built much closer to groundwater wells than what can be regarded as safe. This results in groundwater pollution and household members falling sick when using this groundwater as a source of drinking water.

As a very general guideline it is recommended that the bottom of the pit should be at least 2 metres (6.6 ft) above groundwater level, and a minimum horizontal distance of 30 metres (98 ft) between a pit and a water source is normally recommended to limit exposure to microbial contamination. However, no general statement should be made regarding the minimum lateral separation distances required to prevent contamination of a well from a pit latrine. For example, even 50 metres (160 ft) of lateral separation distance might not be sufficient in a strongly karstified system with a downgradient supply well or spring, while 10 metres (33 ft) of lateral separation distance is completely sufficient if there is a well developed clay cover layer and the annular space of the groundwater well is well sealed.

If the local hydrogeological conditions (which can vary within a space of a few square kilometres; a square mile or two) are ignored, pit latrines can cause significant public health risks via contaminated groundwater. In addition to the issue of pathogens, there is also the issue of nitrate pollution in groundwater from pit latrines. Elevated nitrate levels in drinking water from private wells is thought to have caused cases of blue baby syndrome in children in rural areas of Romania and Bulgaria in Eastern Europe.

=== Pit lining ===
==== Partial ====
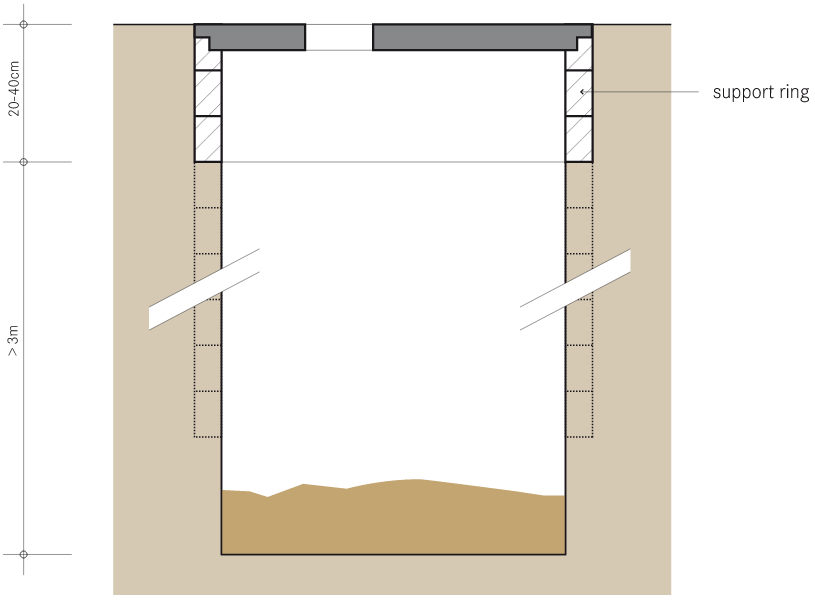
Schematic of the pit of a pit latrine. The defecation hole in the slab is shown at the top, and the user squats or sits above this defecation hole. Pits can be lined with a support ring at the top of the pit as shown in this schematic.

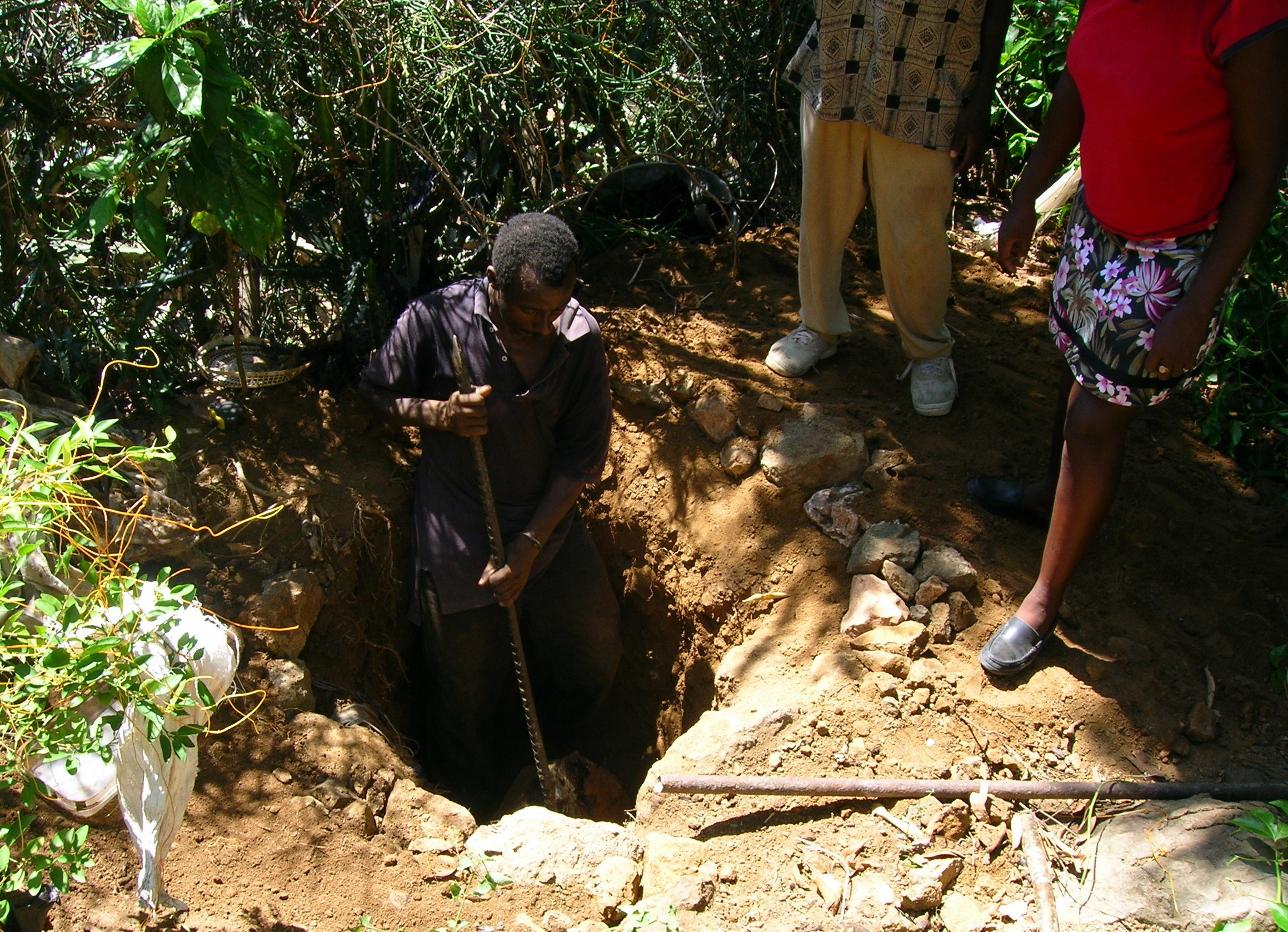
Digging the pit for an Arborloo, a type of pit toilet in Cap-Haitien, Haiti

A "partially lined" pit latrine is one where the upper part of the hole in the ground is lined. Pit lining materials can include brick, rot-resistant timber, concrete, stones, or mortar plastered onto the soil. This partial lining is recommended for those pit latrine used by a great number of people – such as a public restroom in rural areas, or in a woodland park or busy lay-by, rest stop or other similarly busy location – or where the soils are unstable in order to increase permanence and allow emptying of the pit without it collapsing easily. The bottom of the pit should remain unlined to allow for the infiltration of liquids out of the pit.

==== Fully ====
A fully lined pit latrine has concrete lining also at the base so that no liquids infiltrate into the ground. One could argue that this is no longer a "pit" latrine in the stricter sense. The advantage is that no groundwater contamination can occur. The major disadvantage is that a fully lined pit latrine fills up very fast (as the urine cannot escape the pit) which results in high costs to empty and maintain the latrine. Increased odour can also be an issue as the pit content is much wetter and emits more odour. This type of pit latrine is used only in special circumstances, e.g. in denser settlements where groundwater protection is paramount.

=== Appropriateness ===
Pit latrines are often built in developing countries even in situations where they are not recommended. These situations include areas which are prone to flooding, unstable or rocky soil and high groundwater levels. There is also the disadvantage that pit latrines have to be outdoors which creates security issues at night.

In conditions where pit latrines are not suitable, the installations of other types of toilets can be considered, e.g. the urine-diverting dry toilet (UDDT).

== Types ==
Pit latrines collect human feces in a hole in the ground. The principle of a pit latrine is that all liquids that enter the pit – in particular urine and water used for anal cleansing – seep into the ground (the only exception are fully lined pit latrines, see below).

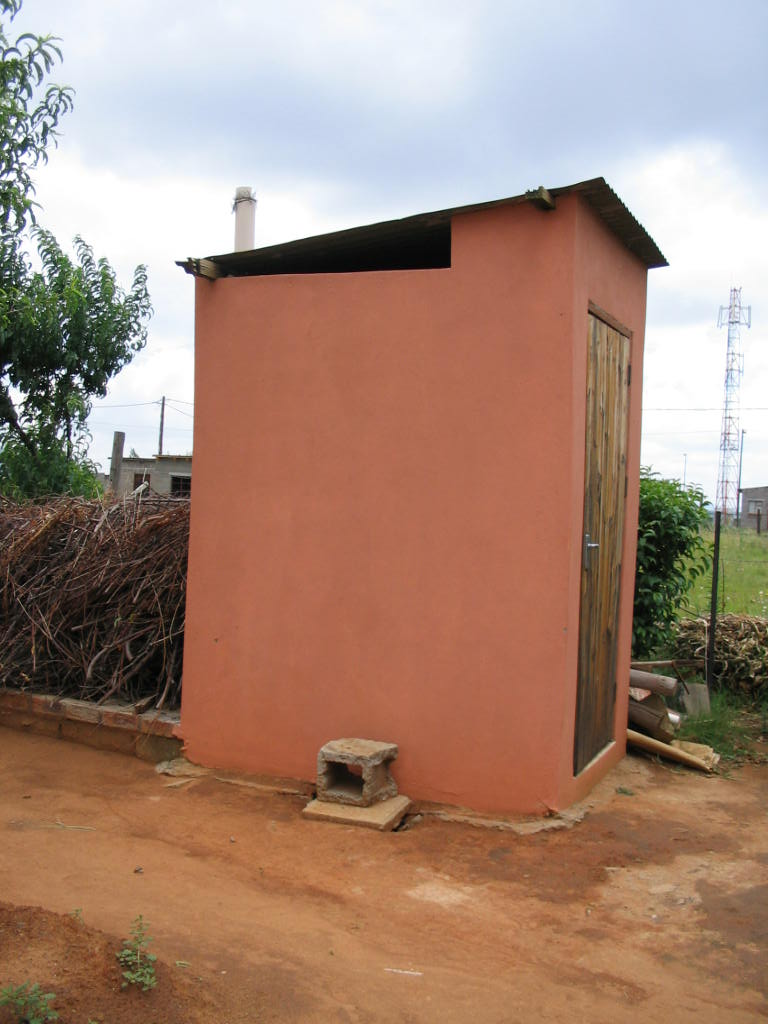
Well maintained pit latrine at a rural household near Maseru, Lesotho

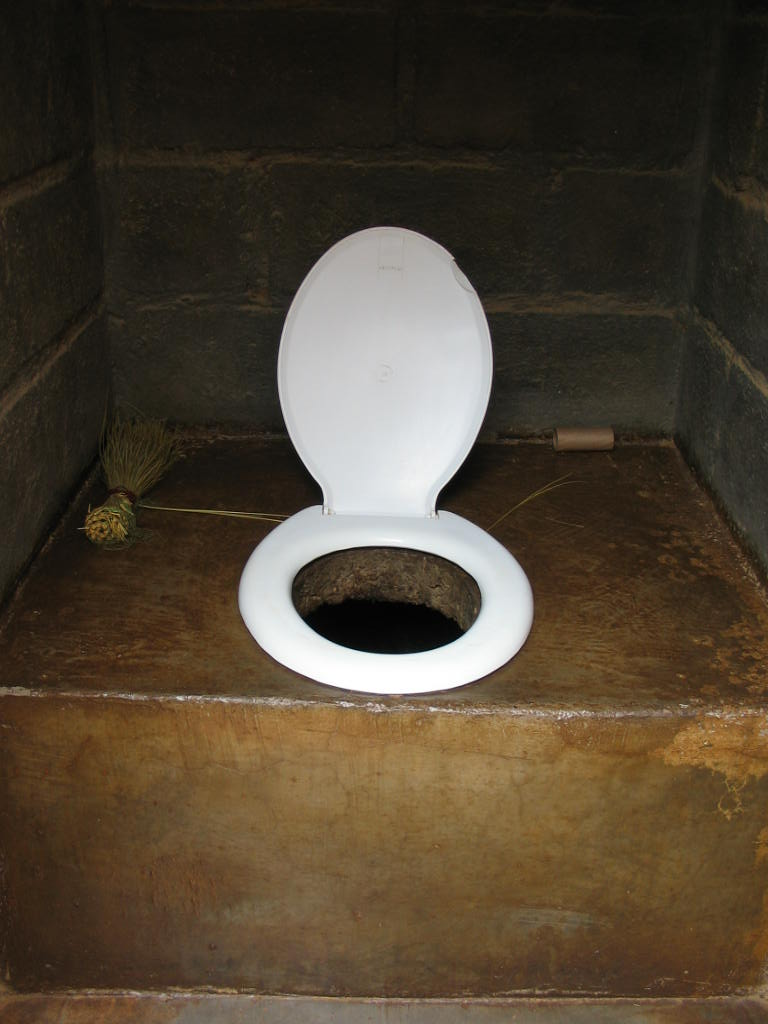
Pit latrine from the inside at a household near Maseru, Lesotho (same toilet as shown left from the outside)

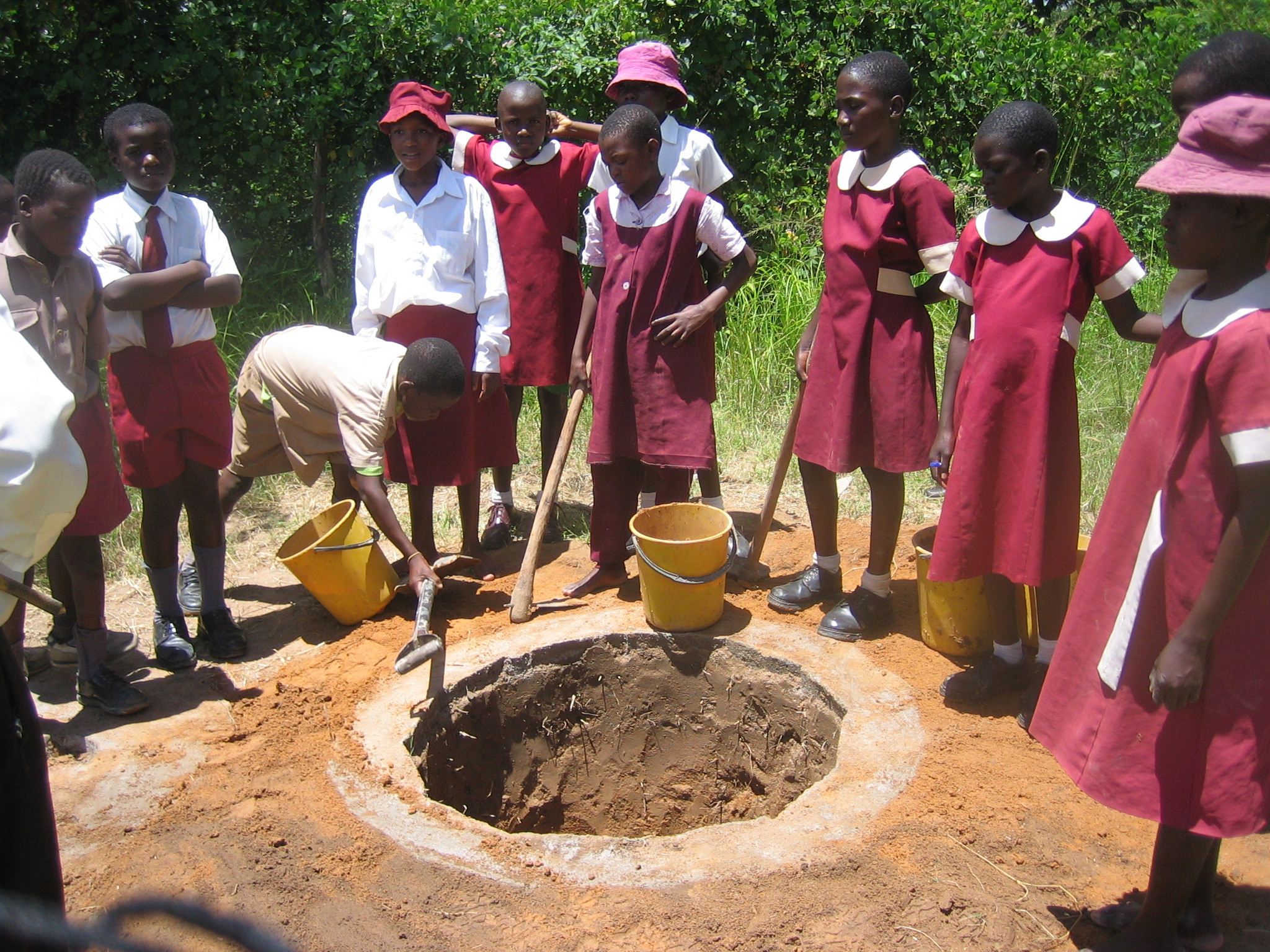
School children in Zimbabwe digging a shallow pit for an Arborloo toilet (a variation of a pit latrine), Epworth in Harare, Zimbabwe

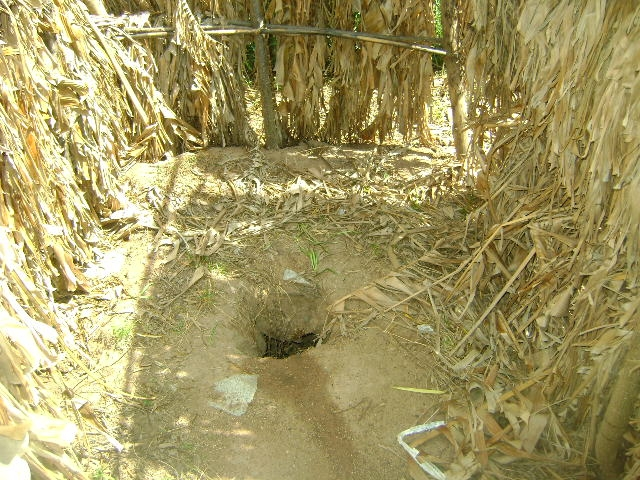
Traditional pit latrine in North Kamenya, Kenya

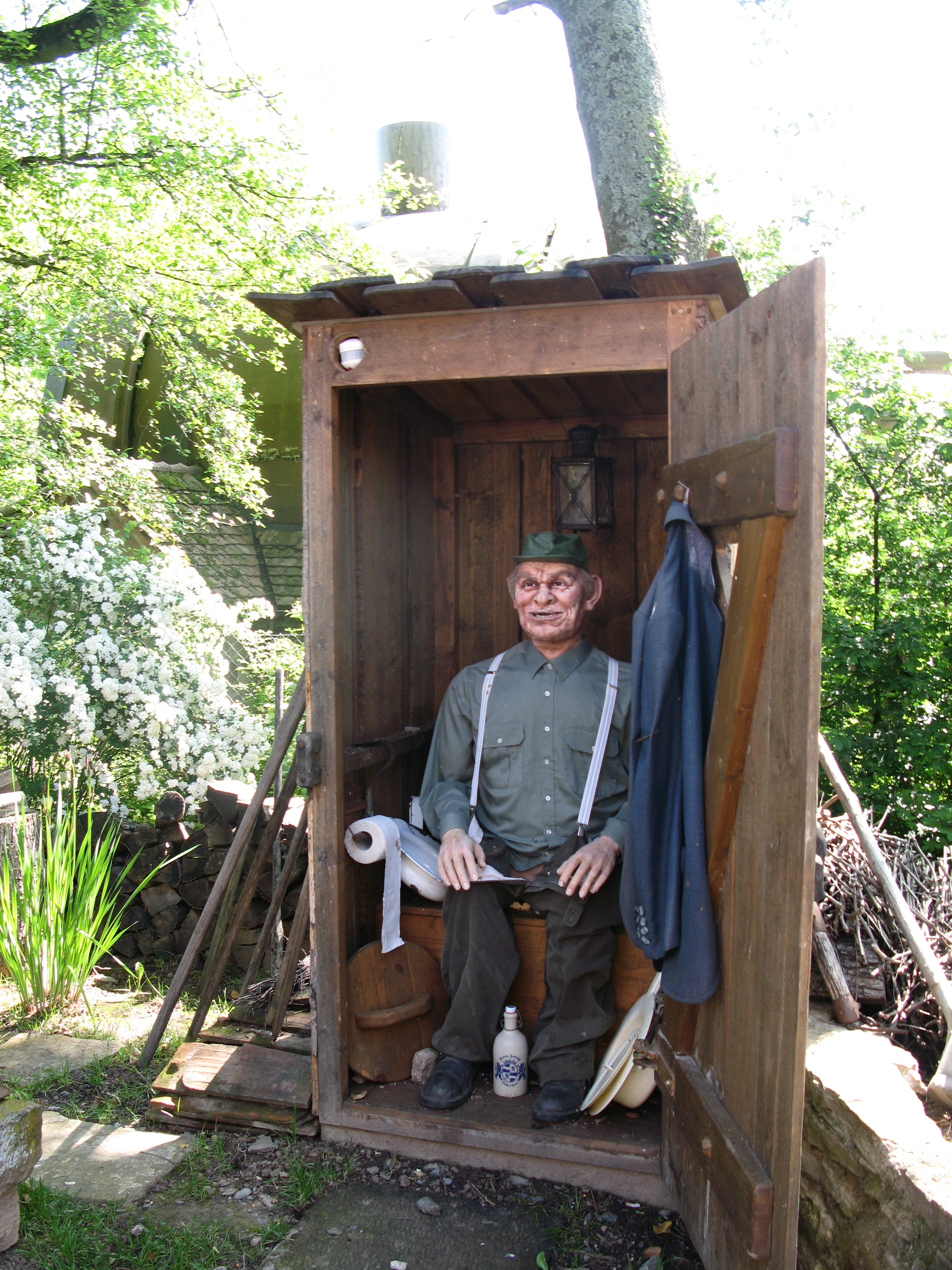
This display shows children what toilets in rural areas in Germany used to look like in the recent past.

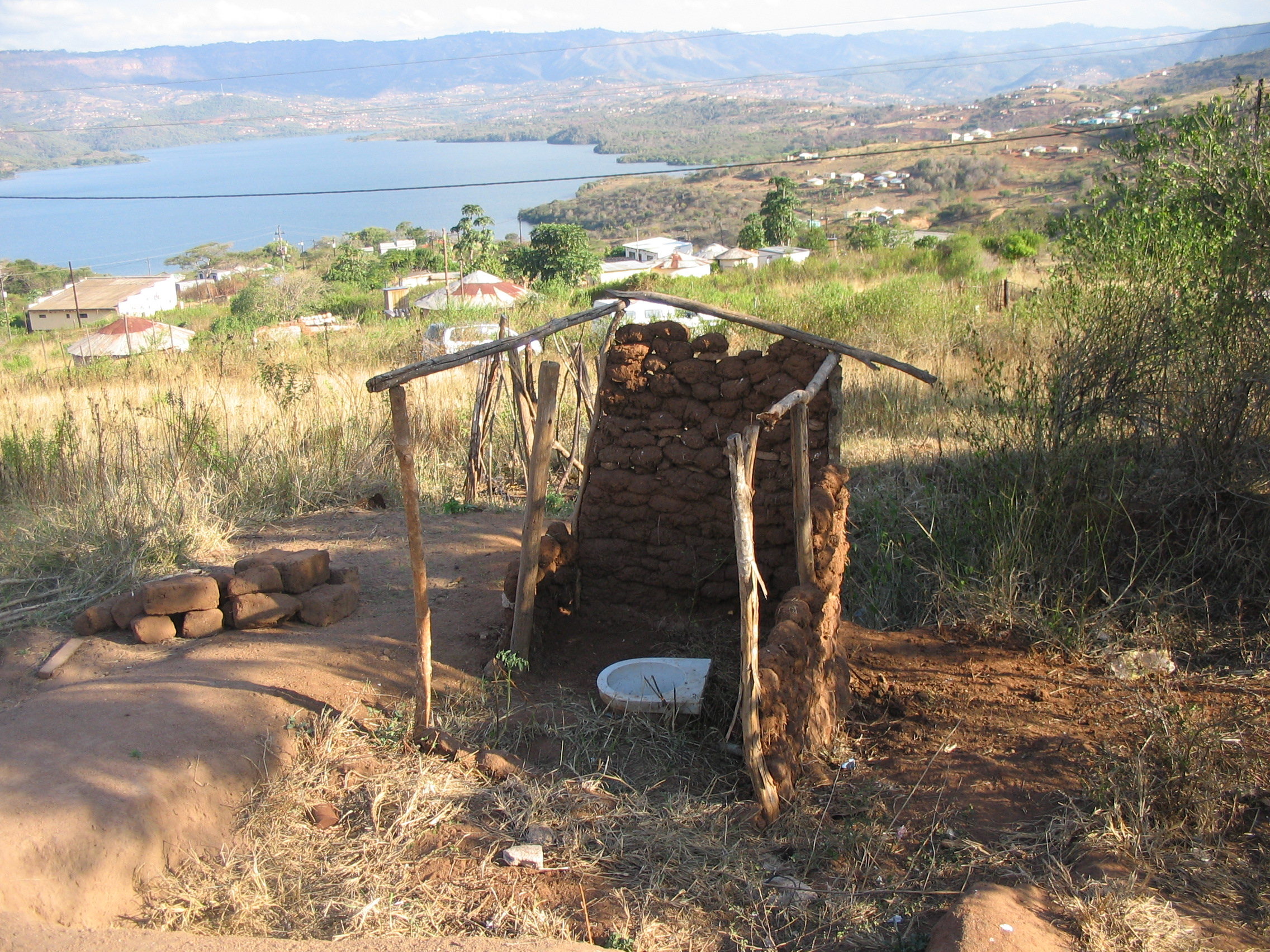
Abandoned pit latrine in the peri-urban area of Durban, South Africa

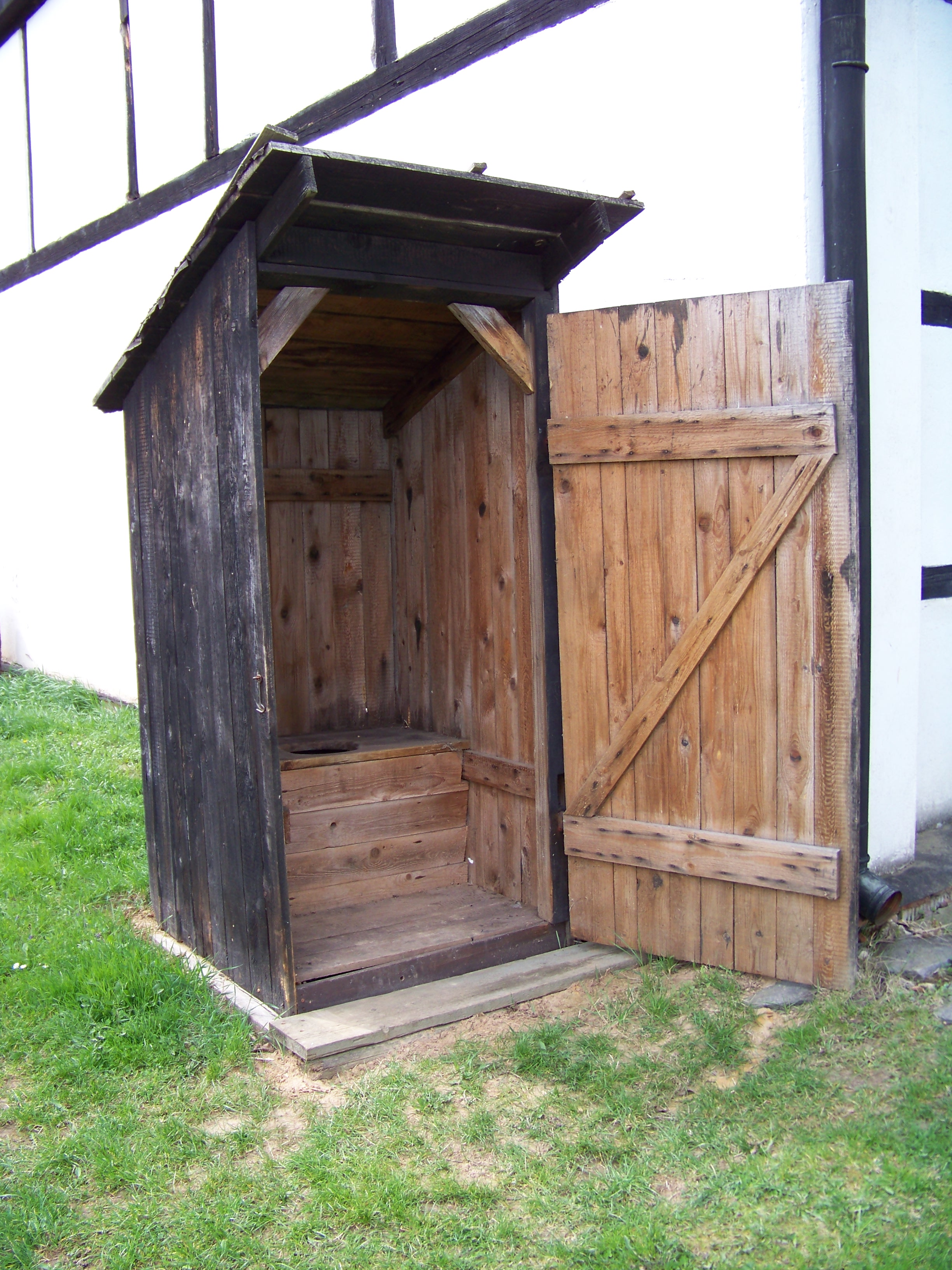
Interior of an outhouse, the type of structure usually built over the pit to provide privacy

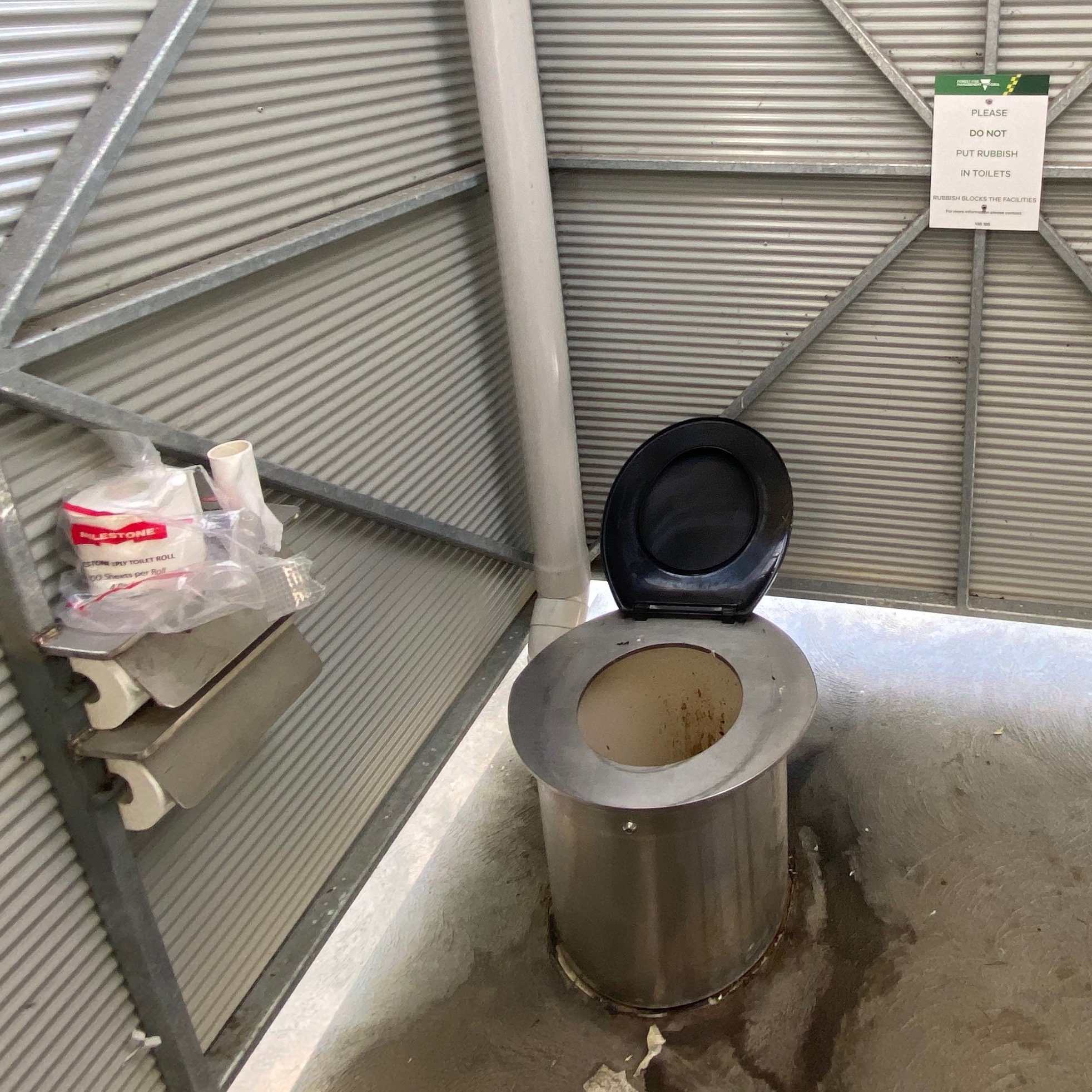
Australian 'long drop' pit latrine with ventilation pipe at a campsite in the Great Otway National Park

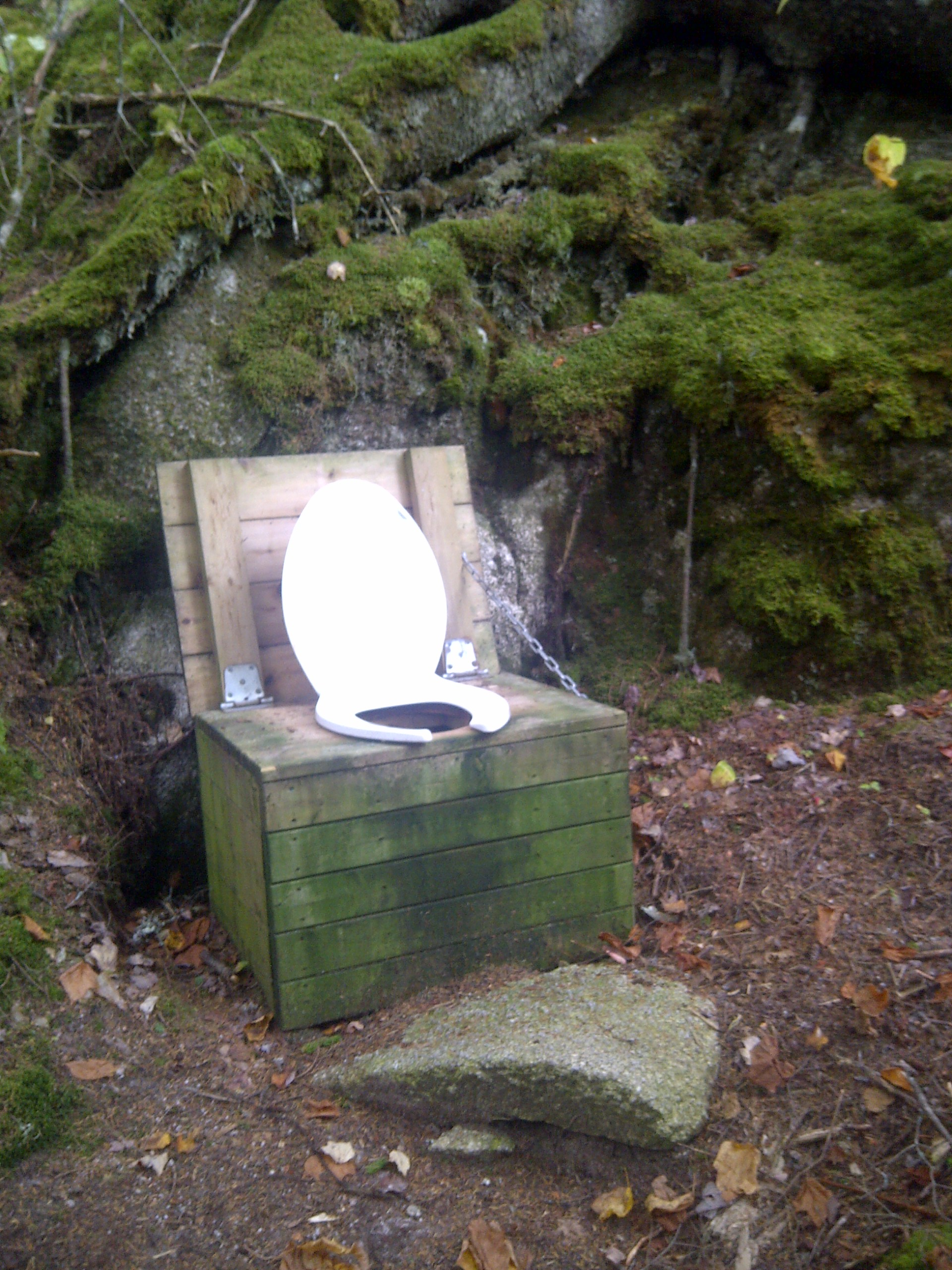
This pit latrine, located near a remote wilderness cabin in Nova Scotia, Canada, has a thunderbox over the pit – essentially an open-bottom box with a seat on the lid – instead of an outhouse.

=== Ventilated improved pit ===
The ventilated improved pit latrine (VIP) is a pit latrine with a black pipe (vent pipe) fitted to the pit and a screen (flyscreen) at the top outlet of the pipe. VIP latrines are an improvement to overcome the disadvantages of simple pit latrines, e.g. fly and mosquito nuisance and unpleasant odors. The smell is carried upwards by the chimney effect and flies are prevented from leaving the pit and spreading disease. Despite their simplicity, well-designed single VIPs can be completely smell free, and more pleasant to use than some other water-based technologies. Flies that hatch in the pit are attracted to the light at the top of the ventilation pipe. When they fly towards the light and try to escape, they are trapped by the flyscreen and die. The ventilation also allows odours to escape and minimizes the attraction for flies.

To ensure that there is a flow of air through the latrine, there must be adequate ventilation of the superstructure. This is usually achieved by leaving openings above and below the door, or by constructing a spiral wall without a door.

Covering the feces with an absorbent decreases smell and discourages flies. These may include soil, sawdust, ash, or lime, among others. In developing countries, the use of absorbents in pit toilets is not commonly practiced.

The vent pipe should have an internal diameter of at least 110 mm (4 1/4 in) and reach more than 300 mm (12 in) above the highest point of the toilet superstructure. Typically, the pit is at least 3 metres (9.8 ft) deep and 1 to 1.5 metres (3.3 to 4.9 ft) in diameter, depending on the number of users. Deep pits can last up to 20 or more years.

As liquid leaches from the pit and migrates through the unsaturated soil matrix, pathogenic germs are sorbed to the soil surface. In this way, pathogens can be removed prior to contact with groundwater. The degree of removal varies with soil type, distance travelled, moisture and other environmental factors and, thus, it is difficult to estimate the distance necessary between a pit and a water source. A minimum horizontal distance of 30 metres (98 ft) between a pit and a water source and 2 metres (6.6 ft) between the bottom of the pit and the groundwater table is normally recommended to limit exposure to microbial contamination.

=== Twin pit designs ===
Design of a twin pit latrine

A further improvement is the use of a second pit which is used in alternation with the first pit. It means that the first pit can rest for the duration of time it takes to fill up the second pit. When the second pit is also full, then the first pit is emptied. The fecal sludge collected in that first pit has in the meantime undergone some degree of pathogen reduction although this is unlikely to be complete. This is a common design for so-called twin-pit pour flush toilets and increases the safety for those having to enter the pit. Also VIP latrines are sometimes built with two pits, although for VIP toilets one problem can be that the users may not stick to this alternation method and fill up both pits at the same time.

The pits are of an adequate size to accommodate a volume of waste generated over one or two years. This allows the contents of the full pit enough time to transform into a partially sanitized, soil-like material that can be manually excavated. Twin pits are constructed 1 metre (3.3 ft) apart from each other to minimize cross-contamination between the maturing pit and the one in use. Also pits are constructed over 1 metre (3.3 ft) from any structural foundation as leachate can negatively impact structural supports. Water within the pit can impact its stability. Therefore, the full depth of the pit walls are lined to prevent collapse and the top 30 cm (12 in) are fully mortared to prevent direct infiltration and to support the superstructure.

There is a risk of groundwater pollution when pits are located in areas with a high or variable water table, and/or fissures or cracks in the bedrock. As soil and groundwater properties are often unknown, it is difficult to estimate the distance necessary between a pit and a water source. It is normally recommended to have a minimum horizontal distance of 30 metres (yards) between them to limit exposing the water source to microbial contamination. To ensure that only one of the two pits is used at any time, the idle pipe of the junction connecting to the out-of-use pit is closed (e.g. with cement or bricks).

Twin pit toilets are commonly used in rural India. the Government's Swachh bharat Mission primarily used twin pit toilets since they were easier and safer to remove and clean. Once removed the waste is used as manure to grow crops

=== Pour-flush pit latrine ===
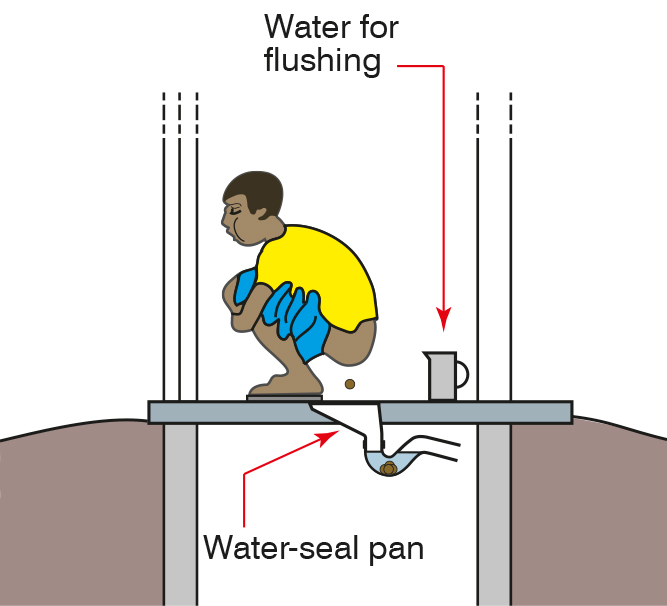
Pour-flush pit latrine schematic showing squatting pan with water seal

In a pour-flush pit latrine, a squatting or pedestal toilet with a water seal (U-trap or siphon) is used over one or two offset pits. These types of toilets do require water for flushing but otherwise share many of the same characteristics as simple pit latrines. One to three liters (quarts) of water is used per flush, and they often have two pits that are used one after the other ("twin pit pour flush pit latrine"). For this reason they are subsumed under the term "pit latrine". The fecal sludge that is removed from the full pits of twin-pit pour-flush pit latrines is somewhat safer to handle and reuse than the fecal sludge from single pit pour-flush latrines. However, significant health risks for the workers who are emptying the pits remain in either case.

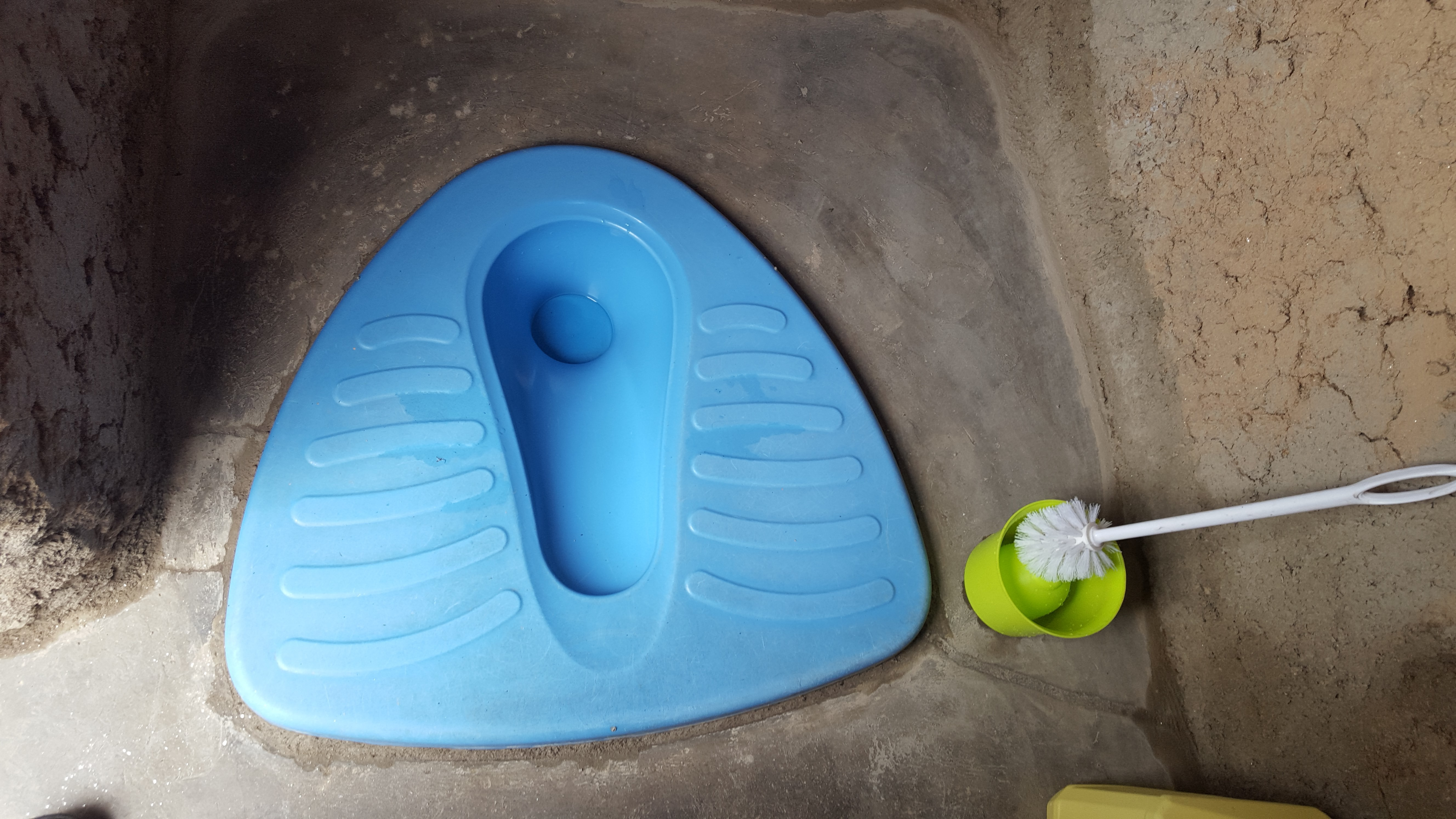
A counterweight slab (called SaTo pan) installed in a pit latrine in Rwanda, converting it to a pour flush pit latrine

An alternative to U-trap or siphon designs is to incorporate a counter-weighted trap door mechanism that provides an air-tight water seal in the closed position. The addition of a small amount of water (generally less than 500 ml; 1 pint) overcomes the counterweight and allows the fecal matter to enter the pit. The devices are sold under the name of "SaTo pan" for as little as US$1.85, and more than 800,000 of them have been installed worldwide since their introduction in 2013.

=== Cat hole ===
A cat hole is a one-time-use pit toilet often utilized by campers, hikers and other outdoor recreationalists. Also referred to as the "cat method," it is formed by simply digging a hole in the ground just large enough to hold the feces from one defecation event. After use, the hole is refilled with the soil that was dug out.

== Maintenance ==
A sanitation worker empties a pit latrine manually near Durban, South Africa.

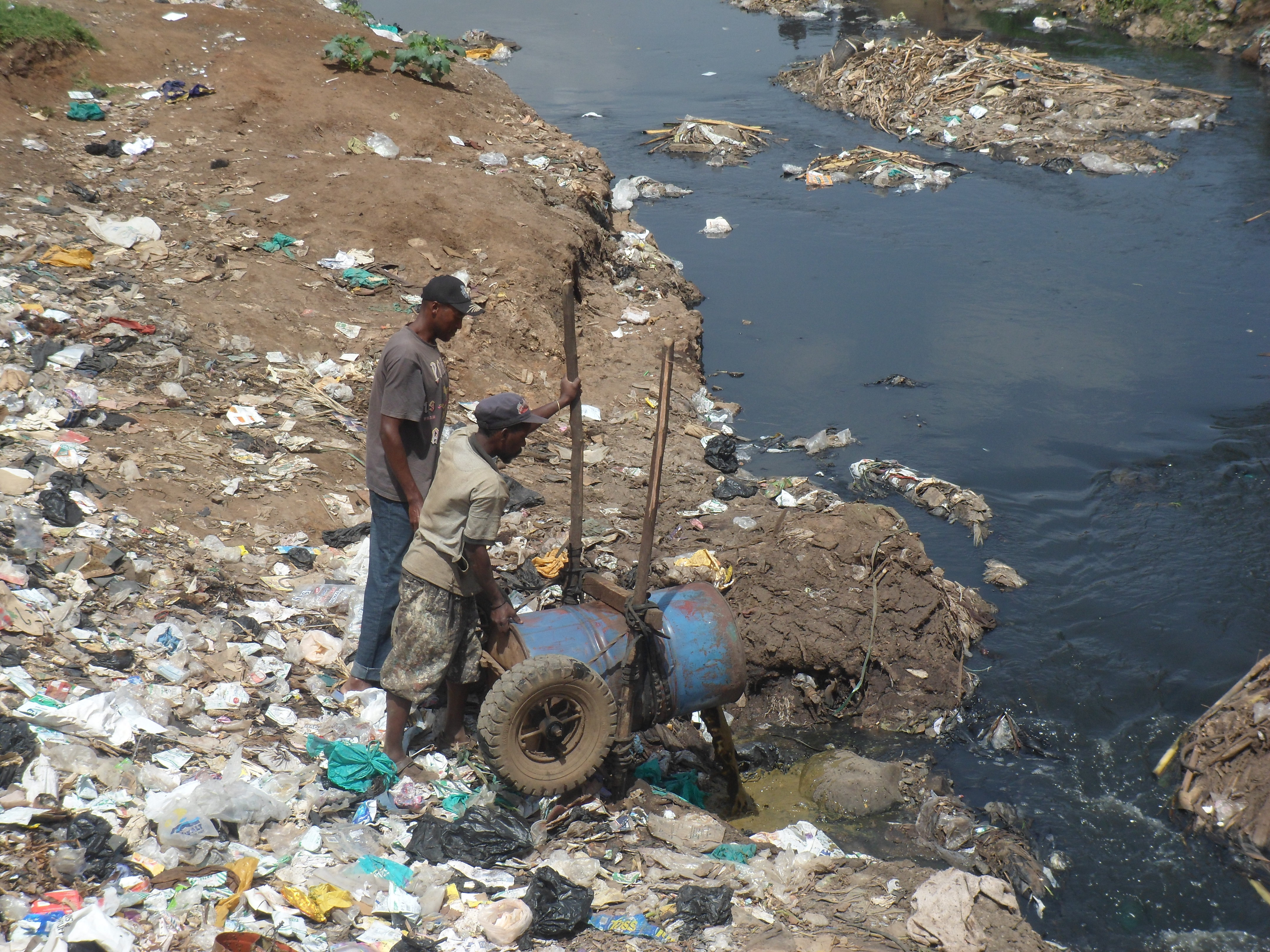
Bad practice example: Sanitation workers dump fecal sludge from pits into a river at Korogocho slum near Nairobi, Kenya.

The requirements for safe pit emptying and fecal sludge management are often forgotten by those building pit latrines, as the pit will only fill up in a few years time. However, in many developing countries safe fecal sludge management practices are lacking and causing public health risks as well as environmental pollution.

=== Pit emptying ===
When the pit is full, the toilet is no longer usable. The time it takes to fill the pit depends on its volume, the number of users, the soil permeability and groundwater level. It can typically take between one and ten years or even longer in some exceptional cases. At that point, the pit can be covered and abandoned, and a new pit latrine built if space on the property permits this. The new pit latrine may reuse the shelter (superstructure) if the shelter can be moved without collapsing.

In peri-urban or urban areas, full pits are not abandoned but rather emptied by sanitation workers or the household members themselves so that the toilets can continue to be used at the same location after the emptying has taken place. The emptying can be done manually with shovels and buckets, with manually powered pumps or with motorized pumps mounted on a vacuum truck which carries a tank for storage. For the fecal sludge to be pumpable, water usually needs to be added to the pit and the content stirred up, which is messy and smelly.

Procedures for safe emptying of fecal sludge from pit latrines is a priority for many developing countries where many new pit latrines have been built in rural areas in recent years, such as in Bangladesh.

Fecal sludge that has been removed from pits manually or with vacuum tankers is often dumped into the environment indiscriminately, leading to what has been called "institutionalized open defecation".

=== Sludge management ===
The fecal sludge may be transported by road to a sewage treatment facility, or to be composted elsewhere. There are numerous licensed waste hauling companies providing such service in areas where it is needed in developed countries, although in developing countries such services are not well regulated and are often carried out by untrained, unskilled and unprotected informal workers.

When managed and treated correctly to achieve a high degree of pathogen kill, fecal sludge from pit latrines could be used as a fertilizer due to its high nitrogen, phosphorus and organic matter content. However, it is hard to ensure that this is done in a safe manner. The number of viable helminth eggs is commonly used as an indicator organism to make a statement about the pathogen load in a fecal sludge sample. Helminth eggs are very persistent to most treatment methods and are therefore a good indicator.

=== Pit additives ===
A range of commercial products are available which claim to help reduce the volume of feces in the pit and reduce odor and fly problems. They are collectively described as a pit additive and many of them are based on the concept of effective microorganisms. The intention is to add specific strains of microbes to aid the decomposition process – but their effectiveness is disputed and recent research found no effect in scientific test conditions.

Wood ash, leaves, soil, compost, or sawdust can be sprinkled on top of the feces to decrease the smell in the case of pit latrines without a water seal. This is however not common practice for users in developing countries. Users often do not expect a pit latrine to be odour free, and endure the smell.

== Advantages ==
Advantages of pit latrines may include:

- Can be built and repaired with locally available materials
- Low (but variable) capital costs depending on materials and pit depth
- Small land area required

Measures to improve access to safe water, sanitation and better hygiene, which includes the use of pit latrines instead of open defecation, is believed to be able to prevent nearly 90% of deaths due to infectious diarrhea.

== Disadvantages ==
Disadvantages of pit latrines may include:

- Flies and odours are normally noticeable to the users
- The toilet has to be outdoors with the associated security risks if the person is living in an insecure situation
- Low reduction in organic matter content and pathogens
- Possible contamination of groundwater with pathogens and nitrate
- Costs to empty the pits may be significant compared to capital costs
- Pit emptying is often done in a very unsafe manner
- Sludge (called fecal sludge) requires further treatment and/or appropriate discharge
- Pit latrines are often relocated or re-built after some years (when the pit is full and if the pit is not emptied) and thus need more space than urine-diverting dry toilets for example and people are less willing to invest in a high-quality super-structure as it will have to be dismantled at some point.

== Costs ==
=== Construction ===
In developing countries the construction cost for a simple pit toilet is between about US$25 and 60. This cost figure has a wide range because the costs vary a lot depending on the type of soil, the depth and reinforcement of the pit, the superstructure that the user is willing to pay for, the type of toilet squatting pan or toilet seat chosen, the cost of labour, construction materials (in particular the cost of cement can differ a lot from one country to the next), the ventilation system and so forth.

Rather than looking only at the construction cost, the whole of life cost (or life-cycle cost) should be considered, as the regular emptying or re-building of pit latrines may add a significant expense to the households in the longer term.

In India, Japan's LIXIL Group has supplied tens of thousands of twin pit toilet systems that costs $10 or less apiece (in 2018).

=== Recurrent expenditure ===
Recurring expenditure costs are between US$1.5 and $4 per person per year for a traditional pit latrine. This includes operational and minor expenditure, capital maintenance expenditure and expenditure on direct support but does not include pit emptying costs. The total recurrent expenditure for more "upmarket" pit latrines has been estimated to be $2.5–8.5 for a VIP-type pit latrine and $3.5–11.5 for a pour-flush pit latrine.

== Society and culture ==
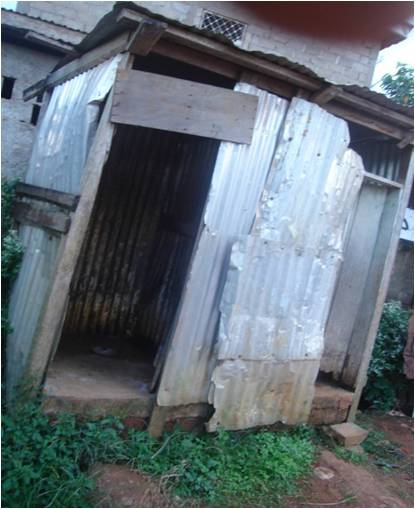
A poorly maintained pit latrine in Yaounde, Cameroon

=== Names ===
There are numerous colloquial names for pit latrines, such as "long drop", "dunny", "privy".

=== User experiences ===
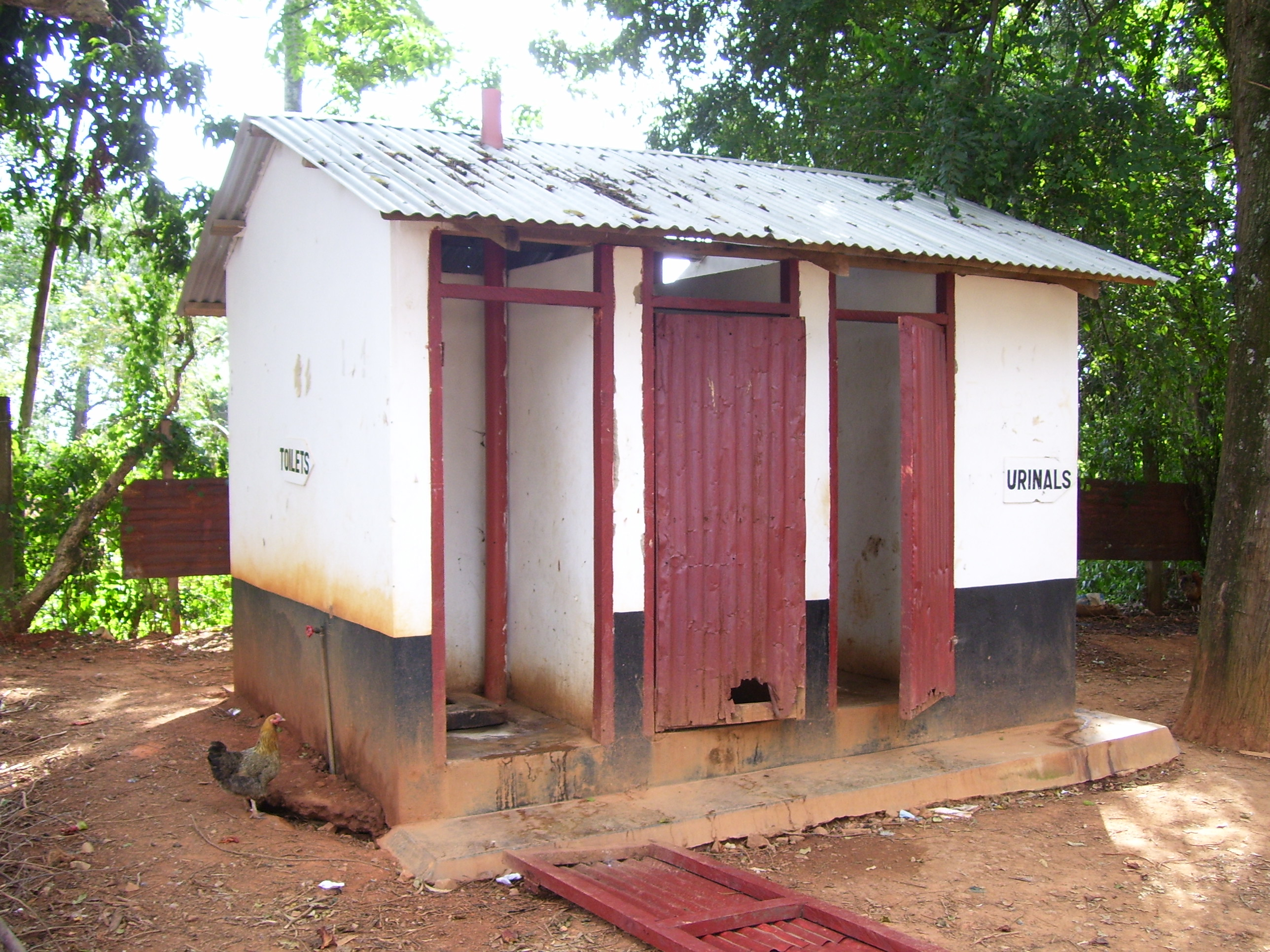
Poorly maintained pit latrine at a school in Nyanza Province, Kenya

Pit latrines may or may not be an enjoyable experience to use. Problems may occur when the pit latrine is shared by too many people, is not cleaned daily and not emptied when the pit is full. In such cases, flies and odour can be a major nuisance. Also, pit latrines are usually dark places which are difficult to keep clean. Often, handwashing facilities are missing. For these reasons, shared pit latrines can be very uncomfortable to use in developing countries.

=== Alternative to open defecation ===
About 419 million people, or 5 percent of the global population, practised open defecation in 2022, mostly because they have no toilets.

Southern Asia and Sub-Saharan Africa have the lowest access to toilets. Pit latrines are a low-cost toilet option that do not require expensive infrastructure. As such, many government agencies and NGOs promote the construction of pit latrines in rural areas (groundwater pollution can be an issue).

The community-led total sanitation approach results in the spontaneous construction and sustained use of pit latrines rather than open defecation.

=== India example ===
The Indian government has been running the Swachh Bharat Abhiyan (Clean India Mission) since 2014 in order to eliminate open defecation and to convince people in rural areas to purchase, construct and use toilets, mainly pit latrines. This campaign is a combination of building new toilets and encouraging behavior change. It is estimated that 50 million additional pit latrines have been built due to that campaign between 2014 and 2017.

Another example is the campaign that took place in Haryana with slogans such as "No Toilet, No Bride" or "No loo, no 'I do'". This campaign promotes the construction of toilets (usually pour flush pit latrine toilets). In rural India, there are sometimes cultural preferences for open defecation and these may be difficult to overcome with unattractive toilet designs, such as pit latrines.

== See also ==
- Bucket toilet
- Cesspit
