= Effective microorganism =

Blend of microorganisms in a nutrient solution

Effective microorganisms (EM) are various blends of common predominantly anaerobic microorganisms in a carbohydrate-rich liquid carrier substrate (molasses nutrient solution) of EM Research Organization, Inc.

Many of the so-called "pit additives" used for improving the performance of sanitation systems, namely pit latrines, septic tanks and wastewater treatment plants, are also based on EM. Despite the claims made by manufacturers, available studies which have used scientific methods to investigate these additives have come to the conclusion that long-term beneficial effects are not proven. Studies have stated that effective microorganisms (EM-A, EM-Bokashi) show no effect on yield and soil microbiology in field experiments as bio-fertilizer in organic farming.

== Possible constituents ==
One trademarked product was originally (c. 1985) marketed as EM-1 Microbial Inoculant. Such EM blends include:

- Lactic acid bacteria: Lactobacillus casei
- Photosynthetic bacteria: Rhodopseudomonas palustris
- Yeast: Saccharomyces cerevisiae
- Others: beneficial microorganisms that exist naturally in the environment may thrive in the mixture.

In his presentational essay "EM: A Holistic Technology For Humankind", Higa states:"I developed a mixture of microbes, using the very common species found in all environments as extensively used in the food industry–namely Lactic Acid Bacteria, Photosynthetic Bacteria an[d] Yeasts (..) EM (..) was developed by accident (..)"

== Background ==
The pseudoscientific concept of "friendly microorganisms" was developed by professor Teruo Higa, from the University of the Ryukyus in Okinawa, Japan. He stated in the 1980s that a combination of approximately 80 different microorganisms was capable of positively influencing decomposing organic matter such that it reverts into a "life-promoting" process. Higa invoked a "dominance principle" to explain the asserted effects of his "Effective Microorganisms". He claimed that three groups of microorganisms exist: "positive microorganisms" (regeneration), "negative microorganisms" (decomposition, degeneration), "opportunist microorganisms" (regeneration or degeneration). Higa stated that in every medium (soil, water, air, the human intestine), the ratio of "positive" and "negative" microorganisms was critical since the synergistic symbiotic microorganisms followed the trend to regeneration or degeneration. Therefore, he claimed that it was possible to positively influence the given media by supplementing with beneficial microorganisms.

=== Validation ===
The concept has been challenged and no scientific studies support its main claims. This was acknowledged by Higa in a 1994 paper co-authored by Higa and soil microbiologist James F Parr. They conclude "the main limitation...is the problem of reproducibility and lack of consistent results.".

Various experimenters have examined the use of EM in making organic fertilizers and investigated the effects of the fermented organic fertilizer on soil fertility and crop growth, not distinguishing the effects of the microorganisms in the EM treatments from the effect of the EM nutrient solution in the carrier substrate. The resulting effects on crop growth depend nonspecifically upon multiple factors, including effects of the introduced EM nutrient solution with microorganisms, effects of the naturally microorganism-rich bio-organic fraction in the soil, and indirect effects of microbially-synthesized metabolites (e.g., phytohormones and growth regulators).

The effectiveness of ″Effective Microorganisms (EM)″ was investigated scientifically in an organic farming field experiment between 2003 and 2006 at Zürich (the study lakcs information on how it was done), Switzerland, differentiating the effects of the EM microorganisms from the effects of the EM nutrient solution in the carrier substrate of the EM treatments. "The experiment was arranged to separate the effect of the microorganisms in the EM treatments (EM-Bokashi and EM-A) from its substrate (sterilized treatments)." EM microorganisms showed no effect on yield and soil microbiology as bio-fertilizer in organic farming. Observed effects related to the effect of the nutrition rich carrier substrate of the EM preparations. "Hence 'Effective Microorganisms' will not be able to improve yields and soil quality in mid term (3 years) in organic arable farming."

In a study (2010), Factura et al. collected human fecal matter in airtight buckets (Bokashi-dry toilet) over several weeks, adding a mix of biochar, lime and soil after each deposit of fecal matter. Two inoculants were tested—sauerkraut juice (pickled sour cabbage) and commercial EM. The combination of charcoal and inoculant was very effective in suppressing odors and stabilizing the material. EM had no advantage over sauerkraut juice.

Due to the fact that only very few studies exist which have used scientific methods to investigate additives based on EM, any claims made by manufacturers regarding long-term beneficial effects need to be evaluated in the intended conditions.

== Applications ==
EM-Bokashi, invented and marketed by Higa, uses commercial EM to ferment organic kitchen waste. Treatments with EM-Bokashi show no effects on soil microbiology or as bio-fertilizer which are caused by the EM microorganisms. Observed effects relate to the effect of the nutrition rich compost carrier substrate of the EM-Bokashi preparation. Natural yogurt, or sauerkraut juice (pickled sour cabbage) can be successfully substituted for commercial EM-bokashi bran.

In India, effective microorganisms have been used in an attempt to treat some sewage-polluted lakes in Bangalore in 2015.

After the Bangkok floods of 2011, effective microorganisms were used in an attempt to treat polluted water.

Scientific methods to investigate applications of wastewater additives have come to the conclusion that long-term beneficial effects are not proven.

Pit additives used for improving the performance of sanitation systems do not work, because "the quantity of bacteria introduced to the pit by dosing additives is insignificant compared to the number already present in the faecal sludge. Similarly, while some additives operate on the logic of adding more nutrients to the sludge to feed bacteria and encourage their growth, faecal sludge is already rich in nutrients."
