= Sanitation worker =

Person who is responsible for the cleaning and maintaining of a sanitation technology

Sanitation workers carrying out manual pit emptying (in Durban, South Africa) with personal protective equipment

A sanitation worker (or sanitary worker) is a person responsible for cleaning, maintaining, operating, or emptying the equipment or technology at any step of the sanitation chain. This is the definition used in the narrower sense within the WASH sector. More broadly speaking, sanitation workers may also be involved in cleaning streets, parks, public spaces, sewers, stormwater drains, and public toilets. Another definition is: "The moment an individual's waste is outsourced to another, it becomes sanitation work." Some organizations use the term specifically for municipal solid waste collectors, whereas others exclude the workers involved in management of solid waste (rubbish, trash) sector from its definition.

Sanitation workers are essential in maintaining safe sanitation services in homes, schools, hospitals, and other settings and protecting public health but face many health risks in doing so, including from exposure to a wide range of biological and chemical agents. Additionally, they may be at risk of injury from heavy labor, poor and prolonged postures and positions and confined spaces, as well as psychosocial stress. These risks are exacerbated under conditions of poverty, illness, poor nutrition, poor housing, child labor, migration, drug and alcohol abuse, discrimination, social stigma and societal neglect. In many developing countries, sanitation workers are "more vulnerable due to unregulated or unenforced environmental and labor protections, and lack of occupational health and safety".

Sanitation work can be grouped into formal employment and informal employment. Sanitation workers face many challenges. These relate to occupational safety and health (diseases related to contact with the excreta; injuries; the dangers of working in confined spaces, legal and institutional issues, as well as social and financial challenges. One of the main issues is the social stigma attached to sanitation work. Sanitation workers are at an increased risk of becoming ill from waterborne diseases. To reduce this risk and protect against illness, such as diarrhea, safety measures should be put in place for workers and employers.

The working conditions, legal status, social aspects etc. are vastly different for sanitation workers in developing countries versus those in high income countries. Much of the current literature on sanitation workers focuses on the conditions in developing countries.

Those workers who maintain and empty on-site sanitation systems (e.g. pit latrines, septic tanks) contribute to functional fecal sludge management systems. Without sanitation workers, the Sustainable Development Goal 6, Target 6.2 ("safely managed sanitation for all") cannot be achieved. It is important to safeguard the dignity and health of sanitation workers.

== Definition and terminology ==
A report by World Bank, International Labour Organization, WaterAid and WHO from 2019 defines "sanitation workers" to include toilet cleaners and caretakers in domestic, public, and institutional settings; those who empty pits from pit latrines and vaults of septic tanks and other fecal sludge handlers; those who clean sewers and manholes; and those who work at sewage treatment plants and fecal sludge treatment plants and disposal sites.

Another definition is: "The moment an individual's waste is outsourced to another, it becomes sanitation work."

Since there are various definitions of sanitation, it is not surprising that there are various definitions of "sanitation worker".

=== Regional differences in terminology ===
In the United States, the term "sanitation worker" tends to be used exclusively for municipal solid waste collectors: people who collect solid waste and take it to a transfer station, landfill, or incinerator. People who work with excreta management are usually known as environmental engineers or environmental specialists. The importance of sanitation workers in the struggle for human rights is seen in the 1968 labor strike of the sanitation workers of Memphis, Tennessee: The Memphis sanitation strike, supported by Martin Luther King Jr., brought together both waste collectors and sewerage maintenance workers.

=== Related terms ===
More commonly, a waste collector, also referred to a bin man, garbage collector, etc. deals with municipal solid waste.

== Types of work and occupations ==
The types of work that sanitation workers carry out is shown in the table below.

Types of work and occupations along the sanitation chain (based on but with further additions)
Toilet/containment	Emptying	Conveyance	Treatment	End use/Disposal
Janitor; Restroom attendant (public toilets); Sweeping; Latrine or pit latrine cleaning; Domestic work (domestic worker); Community/public toilet keeping; School toilet cleaning; Municipalities, government, and private offices cleaning (commercial cleaning)	Vacuum truck operator; Desludging operator; Fecal sludge management worker; Manual emptier; Mechanical emptier (including septic tank desludging)	Manual transport; Mechanical transport; Sewer cleaning; Sewer and pumping station maintenance; Manhole cleaning	Wastewater treatment plant operator; Sewage treatment plant cleaning; Wastewater and sludge handling at sewage treatment plants	Manual disposal; Mechanical disposal

== Types of employment ==
Sanitation workers work in different types of employment situations. They are either government-employed workers, workers of private service providers or informal workers. Sanitation workers who are employed by the government usually have comparatively good infrastructure, tools and personal protective equipment (PPE), and face only moderate health and safety risks.

For example, the tasks of unclogging of the main sewers or operating wastewater treatment plants are usually performed by formal government workers or private companies, whereas the unclogging of household sewer connections is performed by private companies and informal sanitation workers.

=== Informal workers ===
In many developing countries, informal workers collect human excreta from certain types of toilets (such as bucket toilets and pit latrines) without mechanical equipment and without personal protective equipment. These workers are "scooping out feces from 'dry' latrines and overflowing pits". They are usually working in the informal labour sector and are commonly referred to as "informal sanitation workers". They have weak legal protection results from working informally and do not follow occupational health and safety standards.

Informal workers provide "manual emptying services to households, particularly where inaccessible to trucks and to the most vulnerable households". They are not registered or legally recognized, and often work without any protection, facing discrimination and stigma.

== Number of sanitation workers ==
While the definition of sanitation workers encompasses a vast line of services, the number of sanitation workers globally is difficult to estimate because they often have multiple jobs or are categorized with other sectors (e.g., solid waste and healthcare facility management). Also, sanitation workers in developing countries are often informally employed which makes it difficult to determine how many there are.

Estimates at country level include:

- There are an estimated 5 to 6 million "sweepers" (a term used for sanitation workers) in Bangladesh.
- An estimate in 2018 put the number of "sanitation workers" in India at 5 million, and 50% of them being women.

== Challenges ==
A short video shedding light on the unsafe and undignified working conditions of many sanitation workers in India (2018)

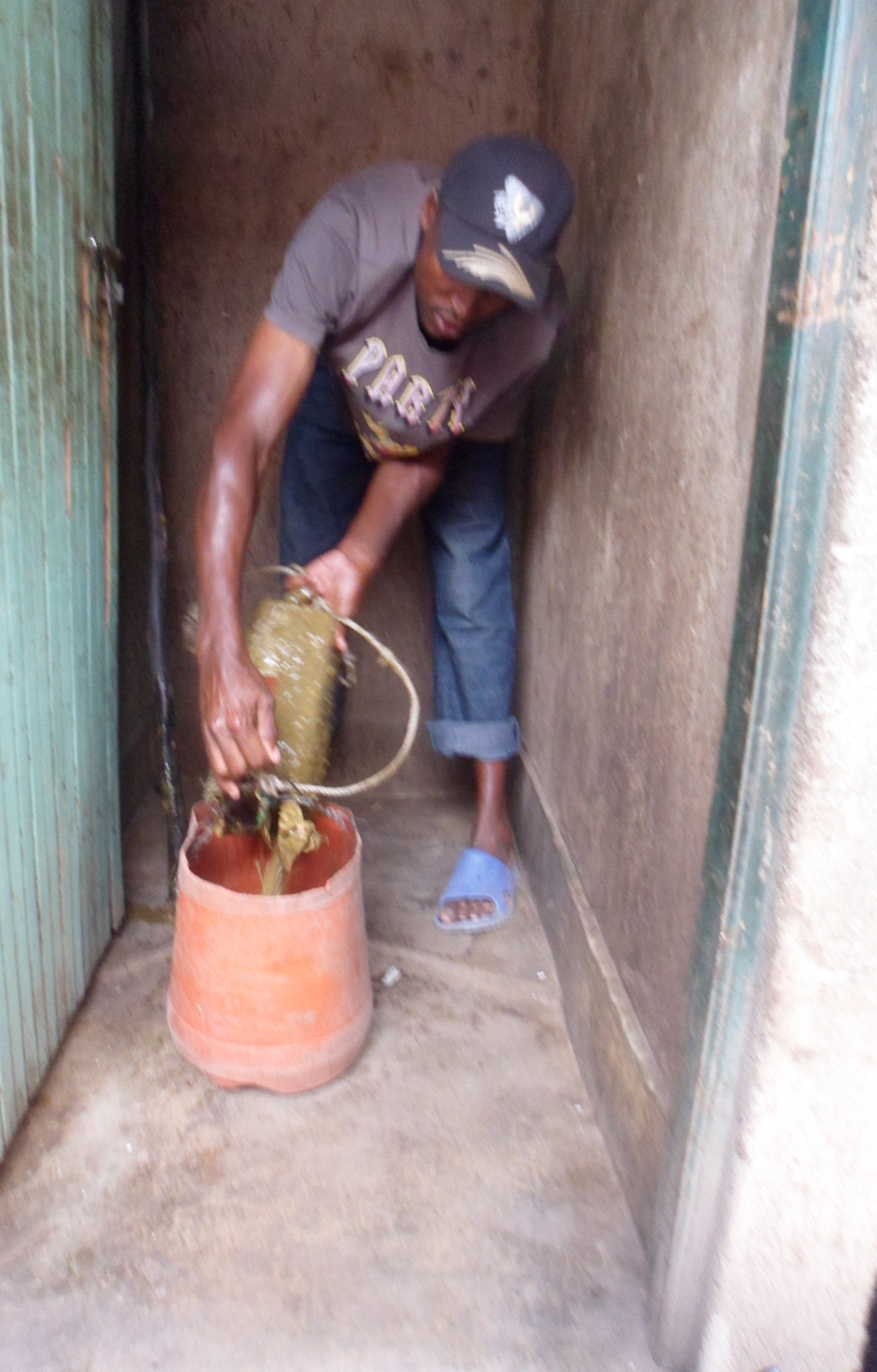
Sanitation workers carrying out unsafe manual pit emptying of a pit latrine in Korogocho slums in Kenya

Sanitation workers provide a critical public service, essential for our daily lives and the environment. Yet their working conditions expose them to the worst consequences of poor sanitation such as debilitating infections, injuries, social stigma and even death every day. The challenges faced by sanitation workers can be categorized as follows: occupational safety and health, legal and institutional issues, financial insecurity, and social issues.

In the case of India, the work of sanitation workers (especially those without formal employment contracts) has been described as: Drudgery, dangerous, dirty and dehumanizing.

The five hidden dangers for people working as sanitation workers include health hazards, discrimination, psychological problems, low wages and lack of social security coverage.

=== Occupational safety and health ===
Occupational safety and health issues for sanitation workers include: diseases related to contact with the excreta; injuries related to the physical effort of extracting and transporting the waste, including falls from height; injuries related to cuts from non-fecal waste (e.g. glass or needles) disposed of down the toilet. There are also the general dangers of working in confined spaces, including lack of oxygen.

Many sanitation workers in developing countries work without any form of personal protective equipment (PPE) and no or minimal formal training. Physical and medical conditions directly associated with sanitation work that is carried out unsafely can include: "headaches, dizziness, fever, fatigue, asthma, gastroenteritis, cholera, typhoid, hepatitis, polio, cryptosporidiosis, schistosomiasis, eye and skin burn and other skin irritation, musculoskeletal disorders (including back pain), puncture wounds and cuts, blunt force".

Sanitation workers are at an increased risk of becoming ill from waterborne diseases. One specific disease that concerns workers in sewers is Leptospirosis, spread through contact with rat urine.

The safety of sanitation workers is influenced by: Design and construction of the toilet or other piece of sanitation infrastructure, pressure by the customer or by the employer, as well as materials and equipment available to do the job.

==== Estimating occupational health outcomes among sanitation workers ====
It is difficult to estimate the burden of disease for sanitation workers. A systematic literature review with 65 studies showed the following: "There was an increased risk of adverse health across a range of outcomes. This is especially true in the case of hepatitis A infections [...]". The review also showed "an increase in adverse gastrointestinal and respiratory conditions associated with sanitation work". A few studies found some "adverse musculoskeletal and mental/social impacts". With regards to mortality, there was "inconsistent evidence on mortality".

Governmental policies and other efforts can work together to mitigate these risks. There are research gaps in characterizing the health risks of sanitation workers in three main areas: "low-income countries, among women and those under informal employment".

=== Legal and institutional issues ===
In many developing countries, sanitation workers often have to work with weak legal protection, missing or weak standard operating procedures, weak law enforcement and few policies protecting their rights and health.

=== Financial insecurity ===
Sanitation workers in developing countries are typically poorly and irregularly paid. This applies in particular to those who are employed on temporary or informal terms, as is common for many low grade jobs. Workers are also vulnerable to extortion in many countries.

=== Social issues ===
In developing countries, low-grade, unskilled sanitation workers often face social stigma and discrimination. This is especially true when sanitation is linked to a caste-based structure, such as in India and Bangladesh. This stigma can result in intergenerational discrimination, where children of sanitation workers often struggle to escape the vicious cycle of limited opportunities and sanitation work.

There can be implicit or explicit discrimination, which hinders workers' social inclusion, their opportunities to shift careers, and social mobility. Furthermore, alcoholism and drug addiction to evade the working conditions are common among some sanitation workers in developing countries.

Sanitation workers, particularly those in information employment who manually empty septic tanks and pit latrines, are often subjected to social stigma for their work.

== Approaches for improvement ==
The main approaches used to improve the situation of sanitation workers in developing countries include the reform of policy, legislation and regulation to acknowledge and professionalize the sanitation workforce. Furthermore, operational guidelines to mitigate the occupational risks of all types of sanitation work are required. This includes standard operating procedures, enforcement of laws, personal protective equipment (PPE) for all aspects of sanitation work. A third approach is to build strong unions and associations to protect worker rights.

Motivated staff are needed to keep cities clean and functioning. Concerns like fair wages, medical and maternity benefits (for women staff), safety equipment, respect and security of employment must be addressed. Overall, a "positive perception of sanitation workers in government as well as civil society" would be helpful.

=== Operational guidelines ===
To reduce this risk and protect against illness, measures have been proposed for occupational health: Basic hygiene practices for workers (handwashing etc.); sanitation workers should be provided with proper personal protective equipment (PPE) and be trained on how to use it (i.e. goggles, face mask, overalls, gloves, boots); vaccinations (e.g. tetanus, polio, typhoid fever, hepatitis A and hepatitis B vaccinations.

Technology must match the needs of the workers. Workers are more likely to wear protective gear if they are given a choice of suitable clothing.

== History ==
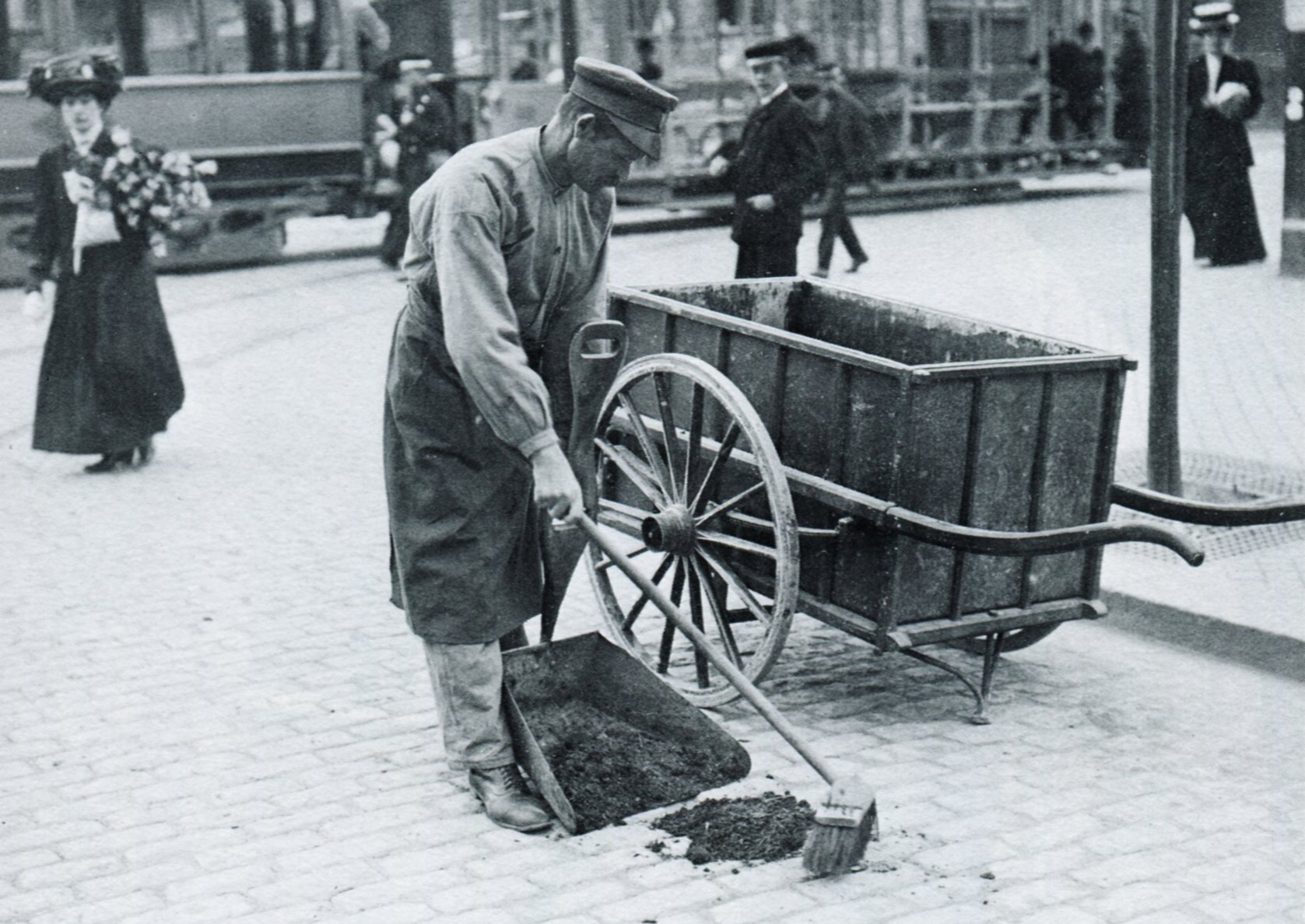
Street sweeper with hand cart in Stockholm, Sweden in 1905

In European history the terms "nightsoil collectors" or "nightmen" and gong farmers were used. The current term for the safe collection of human excreta is fecal sludge management. Towns with sanitation systems based on pail closets (bucket toilets in outhouses) relied on frequent emptying, performed by workers driving "honeywagons", a precursor to the vacuum truck now used to pump out septage from septic tanks. The municipal emptying of pail toilets continued in Australia into the second half of the twentieth century; these were known as dunnies and the workers were dunnymen.

== Society and culture ==
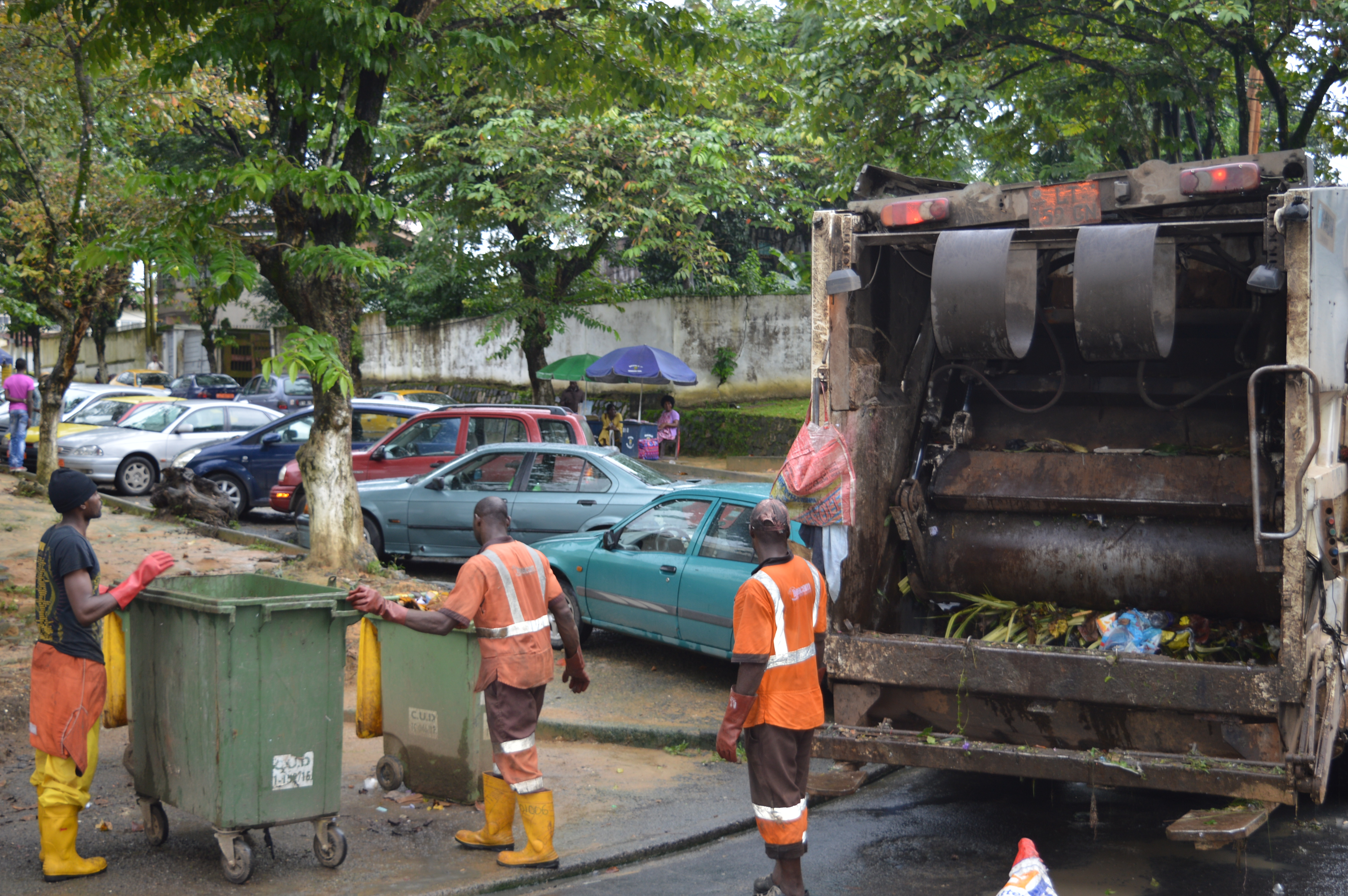
Garbage collectors from the Hysacam company in Douala, Cameroon

=== Income ===
Examples by country:

- Sanitation workers typically earn an average monthly salary of $2,226 in the United States, although this figure can vary widely between states. As of 2022, the salary in New York could range between $47,371 and $89,339. For instance, the state of New York provides total annual wages of up to $91,336 for sanitation workers after 20 years of service. In 2020, some sanitation workers in New York City earned up to $300,000 as a result of shortage in staff and boosted pay due to snowstorms.
- Sanitation worker salaries in Zambia range from 870 ZMK ($42) per month as their minimum salary to 2,480 ZMK ($124) per month as maximum salary.
- In South Africa, public-sector sanitation workers are paid almost double compared to formal private-sector employees who are usually on a minimum wage only.
- In Tanzania, a casual laborer offering cleaning services (e.g., maintenance of toilet, occasional cleaning of drains and sewers) earns around 120,000 TSh per month ($52). A daily laborer employed for the assistance of a cesspit emptier earns around 210,000 TSh per month ($91).

=== Global goals ===
Improving the working conditions of sanitation workers is also important for reaching at least four of the 17 Sustainable Development Goals (SDGs) of the United Nations. The working conditions of sanitation workers relate to "end poverty in all its forms everywhere" (SDG 1); "ensure healthy lives and promote well-being for all at all ages" (SDG 3); "ensure availability and sustainable management of water and sanitation for all" (SDG 6); and "decent work and economic growth" (SDG 8).

=== Impacts of the COVID-19 pandemic ===
During the COVID-19 pandemic, sanitation workers in some countries have been designated as essential workers or even corona warriors to underscore their importance in the fight against COVID-19. They often had higher workloads than before. They might have had a higher risk of infection due to "the presence of the viruses in fecal sludge and sewage". However, as of 2022 there was "little if any evidence to date of actual transmission of the SARS-CoV-2 virus via waste".

== Country examples ==
=== Africa ===
==== South Africa ====
In South Africa, sanitation work is mostly formalized. The different types of sanitation work are carried out via different arrangements in South Africa: sewer maintenance is carried out by public sanitation workers, whereas pit emptying is contracted out to the private sector. In the municipality of eThekwini (which includes Durban, the third largest city in South Africa), there are "approximately 100 pit emptiers on any given day through 15 private contractors, plus 800 municipal sanitation workers".

==== Zambia ====
In Zambia, organizations such as the SNV Netherlands Development Organisation under their WASH SDG Programme and the Lusaka Water and Sanitation Company (LWSC) under a project known as the Lusaka Sanitation Programme (LSP) supported by international organizations including the German Corporation for International Cooperation GmbH, have been working on projects to "legalize and make sanitation workers more visible and create the recognition and respect that they so rightfully deserve."

Lusaka is one of the fastest-growing cities in Africa and the majority of the population live in informal, peri-urban settlements. Various organizations in Lusaka attempt to make sanitation workers more visible and create more recognition and respect for them. They also aim to design projects and processes that improve their working environment and conditions, and help to provide the required investments to support their enterprises.

Pit latrine emptiers empty the toilet pits and septic tanks in communities. They enter inspection holes and sewers to fix or unblock them and then transport the fecal waste to treatment plants, while maintaining the sanitation facilities. If septic tanks and pit latrines are not emptied regularly, waste flows into the groundwater, contaminating the environment and surrounding water supplies. The response from society towards pit emptiers is "stigmatized, lowly, and invalid" despite the importance of the work that they do.

=== Asia ===
==== Bangladesh ====
Bangladesh has sanitation workers in formal arrangement as well as informal arrangement (called "sweepers"). There are an estimated 5 to 6 million sweepers in Bangladesh. They use only basic tools, often without PPE. The informal "sweepers" in Bangladesh face financial and job insecurities, discrimination, and stigmatization. Many live in segregated "sweeper colonies", which are often slum-like. They tend to be dalits (low-caste Hindus) and Christian and Muslim Bengalis.

The permanent workers have more secure positions than the informal workers, with a guaranteed income and other benefits, such as membership in the government emptiers' union.

==== India ====
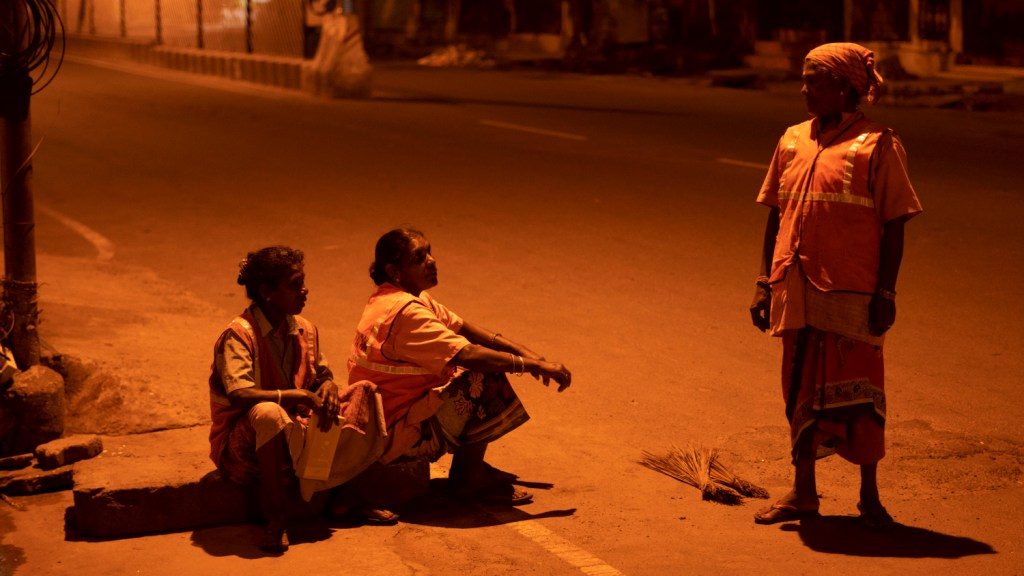
Sanitation workers in Pondicherry, India

"Sanitation workers" can be used as a translation for the Hindi word "safai karamcharis". This includes "manual scavengers", but also people who work as street sweepers, are employed to clean open spaces, collect solid waste, and clean open drains and public toilets. Another commonly used term is "Pourakarmikas" which includes manual scavengers, sewer workers, sanitation workers.

Sanitation workers in India are "overwhelmingly Dalits, and are in fact from 'scavenging castes'". Programs like Swachh Bharat exist to reduce caste-based discrimination in India, but so far have proven to be ineffective due to increased deaths of sanitation workers.

An estimate in 2018 put the number of "sanitation workers" in India at 5 million (with 2 million working in high-risk conditions), and 50% of them being women. Typically, women are involved in the containment process since it requires fewer technical skills and a lower degree of technology, resulting in employment as school toilet and drain cleaners.

In India the term manual scavengers is used historically for a subset of sanitation workers. The official definition in Indian law is "manually cleaning, carrying, disposing of, or otherwise handling, human excreta in an insanitary latrine or in an open drain or pit". The practice has officially been banned since 1993 but still continues.

=== Other regions ===
==== Haiti ====
In Haiti, sanitation workers in the informal sector are called bayakou, which comes from Haitian Creole. The capital Port-au-Prince is one of the largest cities in the world without a sewer system.

The following is analysis from VanRiper et al. about sanitation workers in Haiti:

"A 2018 report estimated that the sanitation system of the Port-au-Prince, Haiti metropolitan area supports 270 manual excavation livelihoods. Based on the population and household density of this metropolitan area, proportion of the regional urban population using latrines, and a conservative latrine-emptying frequency of 4.5 years. we estimate a ratio of 0.001 manual emptying professionals per latrine-using household. Furthermore, reports of manual excavators' team structure and working hours indicate an average team of three to four professionals working for two to three nights per latrine emptied. Assuming 2.5 professionals per team and the population of urban Nord Department using latrines, we estimate 42,000 manual pit-emptying exposure events per year; and with 16 hours per job, this translates to over 800,000 annual hours of direct exposure by manual emptying professionals in the urban areas of the Nord Department.

In contrast, Sustainable Organic Integrated Livelihoods (SOIL) operates a container-based sanitation (CBS) service called that currently operates at a rate of 0.016 CBS excreta-handling professionals (collection and processing) per household. Assuming an 86% increase in efficiency brought about by increases in scale and customer density, if latrine-using households instead adopt CBS, this would yield a replacement ratio of two CBS excreta handlers per manual excavator. Furthermore, based on urban Nord Department latrine users, the equivalent sanitation coverage, provided by CBS services, would support over 500 safe excreta-handling livelihoods. An additional 100 plus livelihoods would be created if CBS was extended to the 20% of Haitian households who currently lack sanitation altogether. Thus, a transition to CBS would replace unsafe labor conditions with safe and reliable livelihoods and potentially increase employment opportunities while dramatically reducing exposure to sanitation workers. These changes would lift multiple community members from circumstances undermining the human right to sanitation, as well as safe and dignified employment. Many previous international efforts to improve the working conditions of manual excavators have been deemed unsuccessful and abandoned. While political systems may lack the enforcement resources to protect independent workers, CBS services provide a structure compatible with safety monitoring and worker protection, and confer dignity to employees. CBS is gaining recognition around the world, and recent research has taken on the question of scaling these operations and integrating them with inclusive sanitation planning. From a systems perspective, the social benefit of a stable and increased employment base in the community is created by CBS expansion."

== See also ==
- Fecal sludge management
- Memphis sanitation strike
