= Bayakou (trade) =

A bayakou is a sanitation worker who works to empty the fecal sludge out of pit latrines in Haiti, especially in larger cities, such as Port-au-Prince. The word bayakou comes from Haitian Creole. Bayakou are subjected to social stigma for their work in manually emptying septic tanks and pit latrines.

The more general term used for this kind of undignified practice, particularly in India, is "manual scavenging". Proper emptying of pit latrines is part of a city-wide fecal sludge management concept.

== Background ==
Port-au-Prince, with close to 3 million residents, is one of the largest cities in the world without a sewer system. Sinks, showers and toilets have no connection to a central sewage treatment plant. Most of the city uses septic tanks and pit latrines. Port-au-Prince finally opened its first sewage treatment plant, Morne a Cabrit, in 2012 with a second, unfinished plant mostly abandoned.

== Description ==
Because of the lack of infrastructure for sewage removal, the city turns to other means. The bayakou in Port-au-Prince are paid to come annually to empty the pits of full pit latrines.

Bayakou use plastic buckets to empty pit latrines during the night. The bayakou work as a crew. One part of the bayakou team climbs through the toilet's squat hole into the pit under the latrine and fills the bucket. Then the person in the pit hands the bucket up to another crew-member. The human waste is put into sacks and placed into a wheelbarrow which a third person carts away. The waste is normally dumped on the ground, ravines or sometimes into vacuum trucks run by private companies who will take the waste to the treatment plant. Dumping waste anywhere other than in a treatment plant is illegal. Some bayakou have been arrested for transporting waste.

Before entering the pit, bayakou pour floor cleaner into the pit in order to soften the fecal sludge. Many bayakou clean the pit in the nude because the filth in the latrines will ruin their clothes and protective gear. Hazards of the job include injury from objects thrown into latrines and exposure to infectious diseases such as cholera.

Bayakou and their families also face social stigma for working with human waste.
