= CBSA =

CBSA may refer to:

- Canada Border Services Agency, a federal law enforcement agency that is responsible for border control
- Core-based statistical area, a U.S. geographic area defined by the Office of Management and Budget
  - List of core-based statistical areas
- Container Based Sanitation Alliance, an association promoting a specific form of toilet systems; see Container-based sanitation
