= Emergency sanitation =

Humanitarian relief process

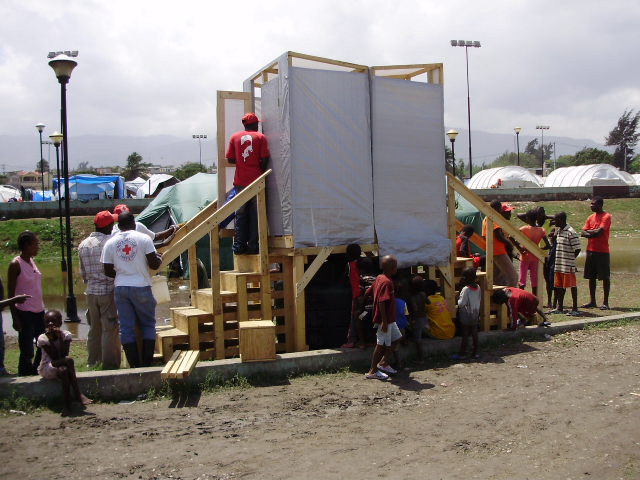
Emergency toilet in Haiti, suitable for areas where digging pit latrines is not possible

Emergency sanitation is the management and technical processes required to provide sanitation in emergency situations. Emergency sanitation is required during humanitarian relief operations for refugees, people affected by natural disasters and internally displaced persons. There are three phases of emergency response: Immediate, short term and long term. In the immediate phase, the focus is on managing open defecation, and toilet technologies might include very basic latrines, pit latrines, bucket toilets, container-based toilets, chemical toilets. The short term phase might also involve technologies such as urine-diverting dry toilets, septic tanks, decentralized wastewater systems. Providing handwashing facilities and management of fecal sludge are also part of emergency sanitation.

The immediate sanitation phase focuses on the provision of proper waste management resources. The main course of action during this stage is reducing open defecation. It is implemented as a course of initial action in emergency situations and it lasts from one to three months. Toilets provided might include very basic Latrines, pit latrines, Bucket toilets, container-based toilets or Chemical toilets.

The Sphere Project handbook provides protection principles and core standards for sanitation to put in place after a disaster or conflict. The short term sanitation phase provides technology to contain fecal matter for as long as six months. 75% of the affected population have access to such resources and 75% of the collected waste is disposed of properly. One waste bin that is around 100 liters is provided for the use of 100 people. Bins are placed at a maximum walking distance of 50 metres from where people are housed or camped.

Waste management bins installed during the long-term phase are sustainable to use for three years. During this phase, 95% of the population have access to the bins and 95% of the waste is properly disposed of. Bins are placed at a maximum distance of 15 metres from living areas. Fecal sludge management becomes a priority during the long-term emergency management phase. Providing showers and handwashing facilities is part of emergency sanitation during all phases.

== Background ==
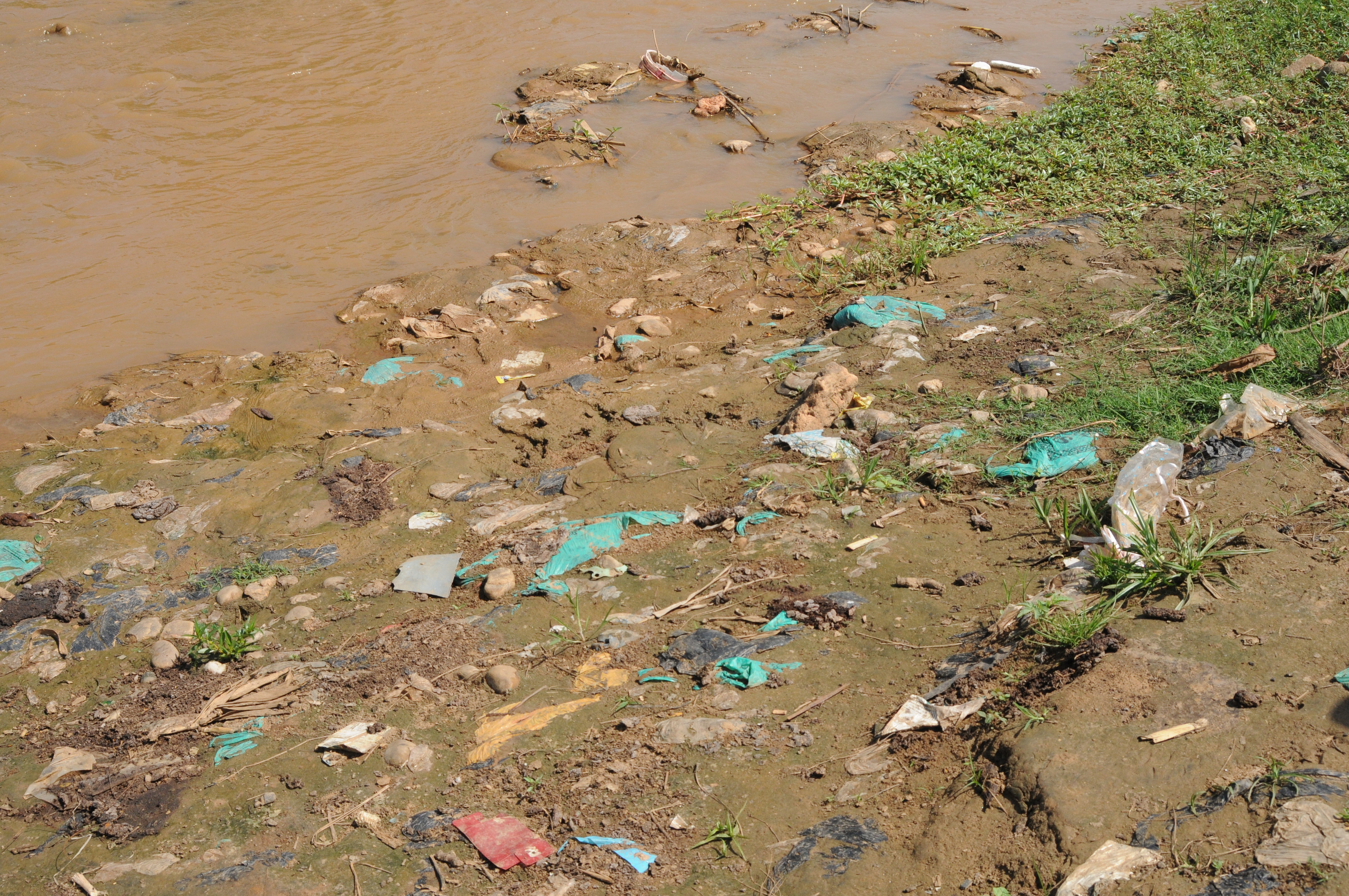
Open defecation along the river bank in Burundi

The term "Emergency" is perceived differently by different people and organizations. In a general sense, an emergency may be considered to be a phenomenon originating from a man-made and/or natural disaster which results in a serious, usually sudden threat to the health or well-being of the affected community which relies on external assistance to easily cope up with the situation. There are different categories of emergency depending on its time frame, whether it lasts for few weeks, several months or years. The number of people who are and will be affected by catastrophes (human crisis and natural disasters), which are increasing in magnitude and frequency, is rapidly increasing. The affected people are subjected to such dangers as temporary homelessness and risks to life and health.

Emergency sanitation is put into place to create suitable living conditions for populations who lack proper water resources and to decrease the spread of waterborne illnesses. In June 2012, a conference was held with various relief agencies and government officials in order to address proper management of human fecal matter along with the public health of people struck with disaster. They concluded that the current sanitation solutions were not up to date nor the best of quality. The decision to utilize technology to track human feces collection along with the creation of emergency sanitation coordination centers and the use of smart toilets were among a few of the implemented policies.

== Methods ==
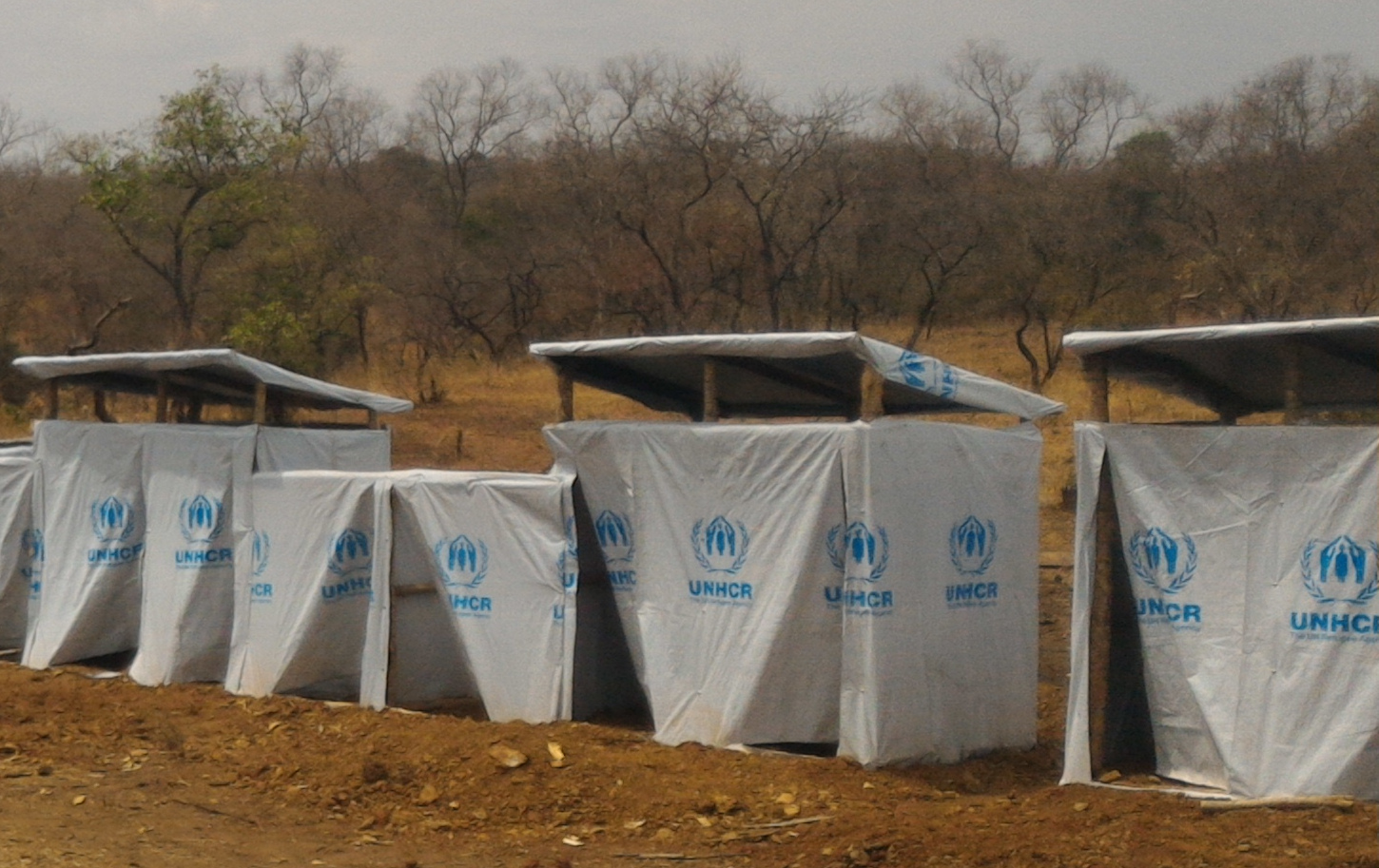
Emergency pit latrines with bathing shelters built in the Bidi Bidi Refugee Settlement in northern Uganda

To address the problem of public health and the spread of dangerous diseases that come as a result of lack of sanitation and open defecation, humanitarian actors focus on the construction of, for example, pit latrines and the implementation of hygiene promotion programs.

The supply of drinking water during an emergency in an urban-setting has been improved by the introduction of standardised, rapid deployment kits. Alternatively, germ-infected water can be sanitized by adding disinfectants, boiling and/or filtering. If the water supply contains toxic chemicals it cannot be made safe to drink.

In the immediate emergency phase, the focus is on managing open defecation, and toilet technologies might include very basic trench latrines, pit latrines, bucket toilets, container-based toilets, chemical toilets. For short-term emergencies there should be an approximate of 1 latrine or toilet for every 50 people, and work should be done with the goal of eventually reducing this amount to 20 people per latrine/toilet if possible. The short term phase might also involve technologies such as urine-diverting dry toilets, septic tanks, decentralized wastewater systems.

In urban emergencies, the main focus is usually on a quick rehabilitation and extension of existing services such as sewer-lines and waste-water treatment plants. This can also include the installation of sewerage pumping stations to improve or extend services.

The creation of provisional hand washing stations or the distribution of hand sanitizer (that contains 60% alcohol or more) are put into practice so that people keep their hands clean and thus eliminate the propagation of germs.

Information on health care can be provided to the affected population in their respective languages, including instructions on how to use latrines efficiently. Further efforts can be made to help educate individuals who are not able to read the health communication materials.

=== Standards ===
The handbook by Sphere on "Humanitarian Charter and Minimum Standards in Humanitarian Response" describes minimum standards in four "key response sectors" in humanitarian response situations. This places "Water Supply, Sanitation and Hygiene Promotion" (WASH) alongside the other response sectors, which are: Food security and nutrition, shelter and settlement and health. Within the "Water supply, sanitation, and hygiene promotion standards" the handbook describes standards in the following areas: Hygiene promotion, water supply, excreta management, vector control, solid waste management and WASH in disease outbreaks and healthcare settings.

With regards to excreta management, standards relate to: "(1) Environment free from human excreta, (2) Access to and use of toilets, (3) Management and maintenance of excreta collection, transport, disposal and treatment" (fecal sludge management).

Some key indicators include:

- "Ratio of shared toilets": Minimum 1 per 20 people
- "Distance between dwelling and shared toilet": Maximum 50 meters
- "Number of handwashing stations at healthcare facilities": Minimum one station for every ten inpatients

=== Manhole toilet ===
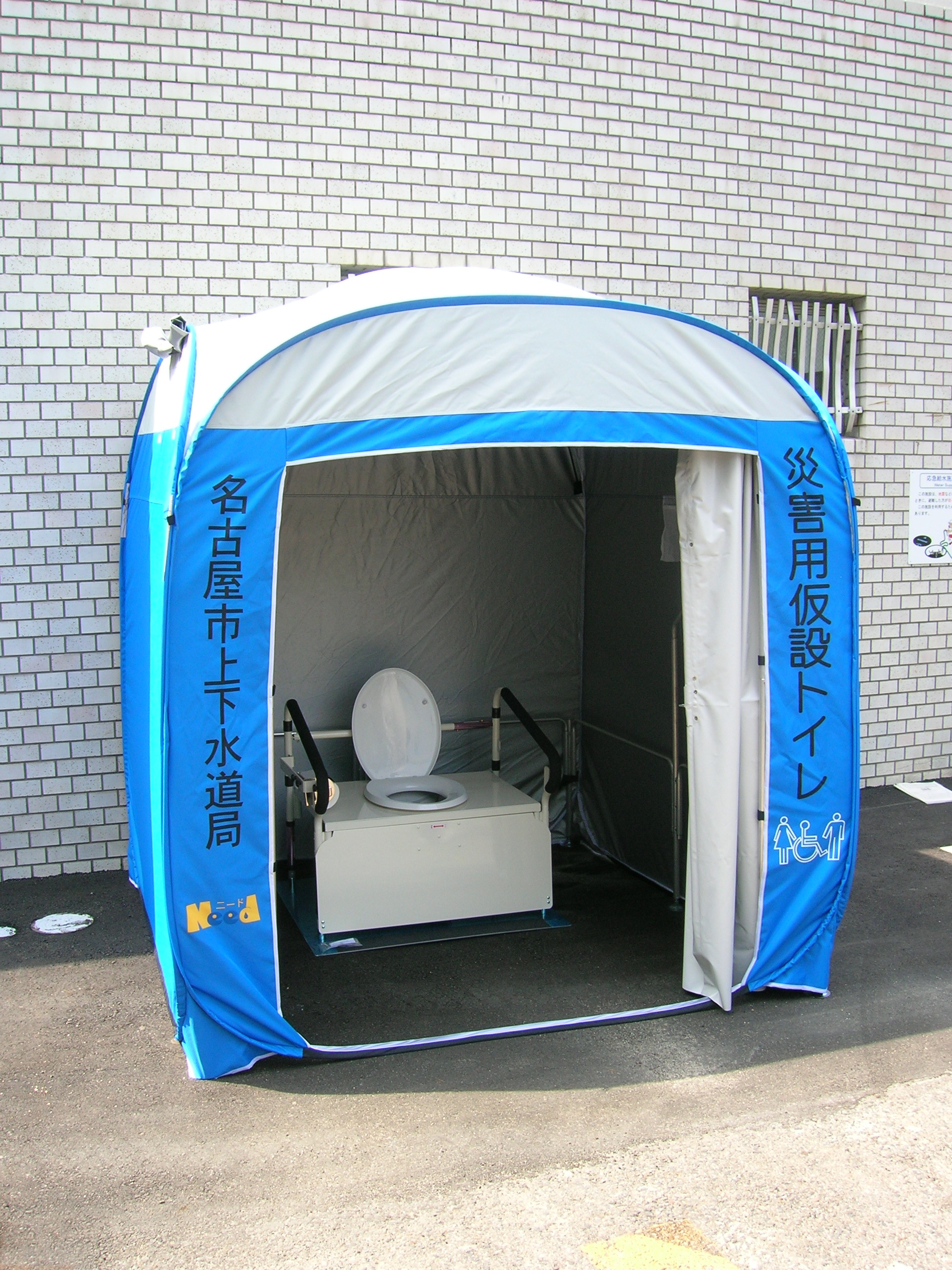
Historical Museum of Waterworks and Sewerage. Chikusa-ku, Nagoya city, Aichi Prefecture, Japan.

A manhole toilet is a simple toilet setup over manholes.

After disasters, one of the most difficult issues to attend to is restrooms. The water supply for these generally comes fairly quickly, but actually maintaining and establishing bathrooms takes more and longer efforts. Many municipal governments encourage twin bucket toilets for residential houses and evacuation sites. These are also called "disaster toilet", "toilet for disaster" and "disaster preventative toilet".

The Japanese Ministry of Land, Infrastructure, Transport and Tourism started using manhole toilets by putting a simple toilet over a public sewage manhole. This has caused issues due to manholes often being located on or near public roads.

There are several types of manhole toilets that are directly connected to the sewerage system. The main types are flow (sewer main connection), storage (sewer main connection) and toilet tank.

== Locations ==
=== Mass shelter ===
Mass shelter settings where the displaced population is housed in existing but often re-purposed building-complexes such as schools, community centres, places of worship, malls, warehouses and sport stadiums. Jurisdictional governments are primarily responsible for ensuring that people are directed to clear evacuation routes and zones. In some disaster prone countries, dedicated large emergency shelters are built for this purpose.

Existing sanitation facilities are usually inadequate for full-time stay of a high number of people, and the non-emergency management structures are typically unable or unwilling to continue their services. Legal issues over the re-purposing are also fairly common, especially if occupation continues for a longer time.

Due to usually cramped living conditions there is a high risk of conflict and often also cases of sexual violence, both of which often are in some relation to the sanitation facilities. Mortality rates are high among large groups of internally displaced people.

=== Emergency settlements ===
Emergency settlements (formal or informal) where previously sparsely populated areas are newly occupied by the displaced population in large numbers. Refugee camps fall into this category. Typically these are set up by governments, the UN and humanitarian aid organizations.

Due to the typically short time frame of arrivals and the non-existing infrastructure, these kind of encampments pose maybe the greatest challenge in regards to providing adequate emergency sanitation facilities. The immediate demand for basic supplies and health services, having to account for the injured, dead, and survivors of man-made and/or natural disasters also aggravates these issues.

=== Emergency healthcare ===
Infection prevention and control (IPC) is an important activity in disease prevention in any emergency situation. It is critical for the patients and the healthcare worker to ensure Minimum Standards are met in healthcare settings during emergency situations, but doing so often requires structured collaboration and support from emergency response teams, including WASH actors.

All healthcare settings should maintain minimum WASH infection prevention and Control standards.

== Challenges ==
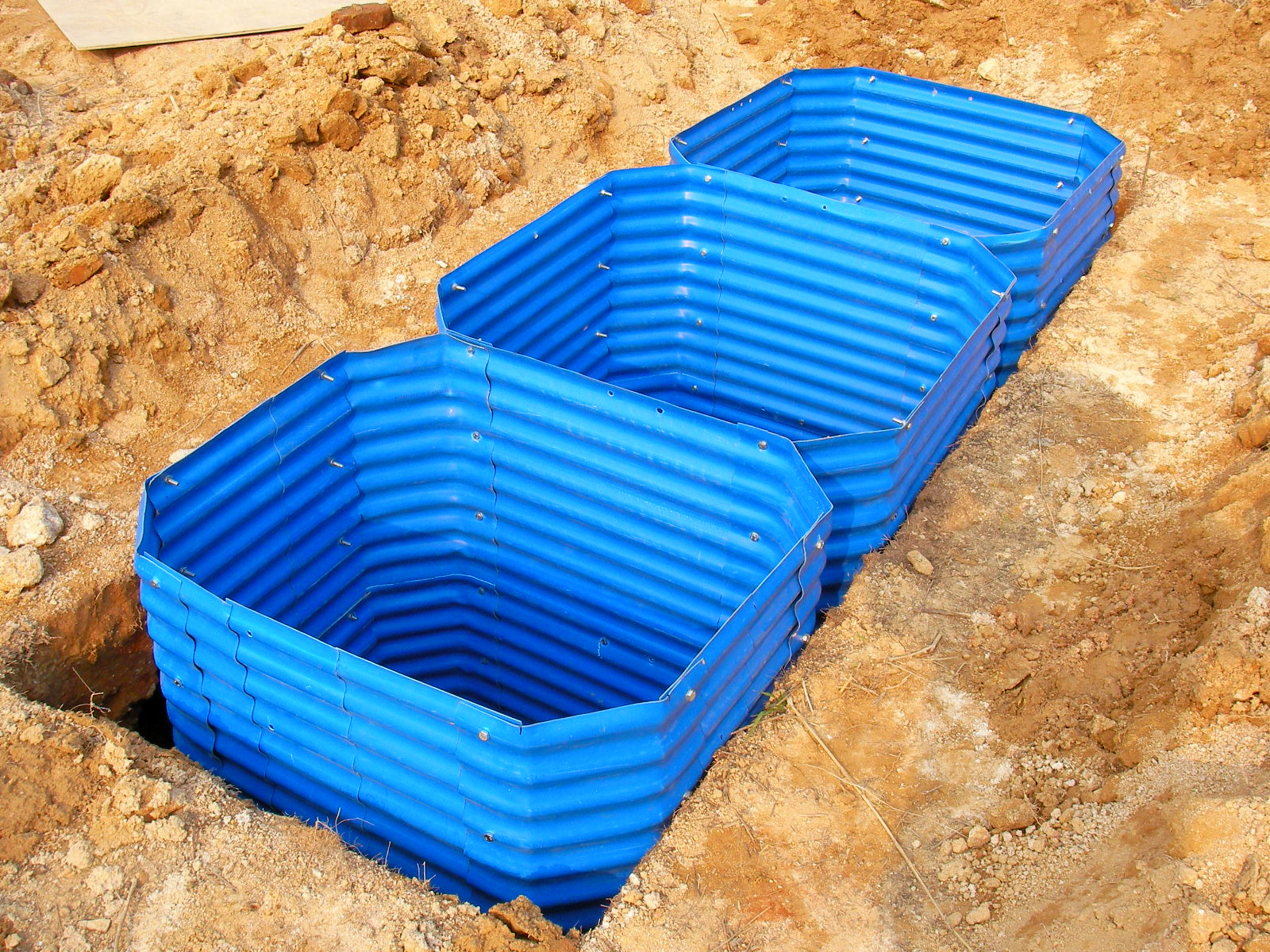
Emergency pit lining kits, suitable for areas with high water table

The provision of sanitation programmes is usually more challenging than water supply as it provides a limited choice of technologies. This is exacerbated by the overwhelming and diverse needs of WASH.

The World Health Organization recognises that the emergency setting is a challenging situation with respect to access to sanitation, and therefore recognises shared or public toilets that safely contain excreta under this setting as safe sanitation.

Challenges with excreta disposal in emergencies include building latrines in areas where pits cannot be dug, desludging latrines, no-toilet options and the final treatment or disposal of the fecal sludge.

== See also ==
- Self-supply of water and sanitation
