= Loowatt =

Waterless toilet company

Loowatt is a waterless toilet company, using a container-based sanitation model in which the containers holding waste are periodically removed for treatment. Waste from the toilet can be sent to an anaerobic digester to create biogas and fertilizer.

In 2012, the company started a trial project in Antananarivo, Madagascar.

In July 2013, the company received a grant of US$1,269,936 from the Bill & Melinda Gates Foundation to design and build a "commodity-generating waterless toilet system".
