= Manual scavenging =

Handling of human excrement

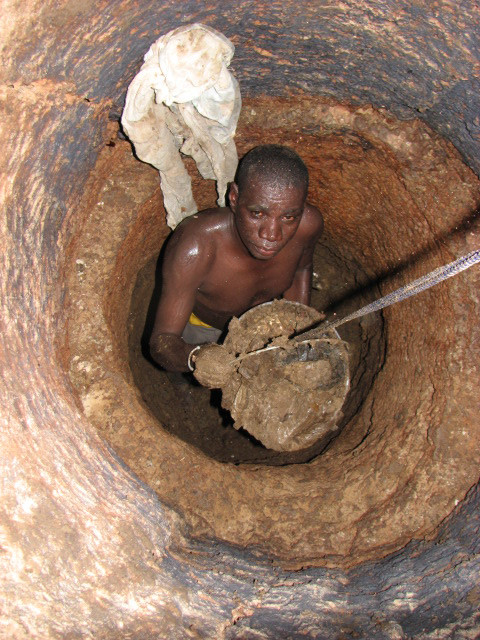
A man emptying a pit manually in Burkina Faso in 2007

Manual scavenging is a term used mainly to refer to "manually cleaning, carrying, disposing of, or otherwise handling, human excreta in an insanitary latrine or in an open drain or sewer or in a septic tank or a pit". Manual scavengers usually use hand tools such as buckets, brooms and shovels. The workers have to move the excreta, using brooms and tin plates, into baskets, which they carry to disposal locations sometimes several kilometers away. The practice of employing human labour for cleaning of sewers and septic tanks is prevalent in India, Bangladesh and Pakistan. These sanitation workers, called "manual scavengers", rarely have any personal protective equipment. The work is regarded as a dehumanising practice.

The occupation of sanitation work is intrinsically linked with caste in India. All kinds of cleaning are considered lowly and are assigned to people from the lowest rung of the social hierarchy. In the caste-based society, it is mainly the Dalits who work as sanitation workers - as manual scavengers, cleaners of drains, as garbage collectors and sweepers of roads. It was estimated in 2019 that between 40 and 60 percent of the six million households of Dalit sub-castes are engaged in sanitation work. The most common Dalit caste performing sanitation work is the Valmiki (also Balmiki) caste.

The construction of dry toilets and employment of manual scavengers to clean such dry toilets was prohibited in India in 1993. The law was extended and clarified to include ban on use of human labour for direct cleaning of sewers, ditches, pits and septic tanks in 2013. However, despite the laws, manual scavenging was reported in many states including Maharashtra, Gujarat, Madhya Pradesh, Uttar Pradesh, and Rajasthan in 2014. In 2021, the NHRC observed that eradication of manual scavenging as claimed by state and local governments is far from over. Government data shows that in the period 1993–2021, 971 people died due to cleaning of sewers and septic tanks.

The term "manual scavenging" differs from the stand-alone term "scavenging", which is one of the oldest economic activities and refers to the act of sorting though and picking from discarded waste. Sometimes called waste pickers or ragpickers, scavengers usually collect from the streets, dumpsites, or landfills. They collect reusable and recyclable material to sell, reintegrating it into the economy's production process. The practice exists in cities and towns across the Global South.

== Definition ==
Manual scavenging refers to the unsafe and manual removal of raw (fresh and untreated) human excreta from buckets or other containers that are used as toilets or from the pits of simple pit latrines. The safe and controlled emptying of pit latrines, on the other hand, is one component of fecal sludge management.

The official definition of a manual scavenger in Indian law from 1993 is as follows:

"manual scavenger" means a person engaged in or employed for manually carrying human excreta and the expression "manual scavenging" shall be construed accordingly

In 2013, the definition of manual scavenger was expanded to include persons employed in cleaning of septic tanks, open drains and railway tracks. It reads:

"Manual scavenger" means a person engaged or employed, at the commencement of this Act or at any time thereafter, by an individual or a local authority or an agency or a contractor, for manually cleaning, carrying, disposing of, or otherwise handling in any manner, human excreta in an insanitary latrine or in an open drain or pit into which the human excreta from the insanitary latrines is disposed of, or railway track or in such other spaces or premises, as the Central Government or a State Government may notify, before the excreta fully decomposes in such manner as may be prescribed, and the expression “manual scavenging” shall be construed accordingly.

The definition ignores many other sanitation workers like fecal sludge handlers, community and public toilet cleaners, workers cleaning storm water drains, waste segregators, etc. Such workers are not required to handle excreta directly, but get in contact due to poor working conditions, lack of segregation, and the interconnectedness of excreta management with solid waste management and storm water management, states notable sanitation crusader and investigative journalist Pragya Akhilesh. The 2013 Act adds that a person engaged or employed to clean excreta with the help of equipment and using the protective gear as notified by the Union government shall not be deemed to be a manual scavenger. Bhasha Singh argues that this clause gives the government an escape clause as all forms of manual scavenging can be kept outside the purview of the law by arguing that the individual is using protective gear.

In 2021, the National Human Rights Commission (NHRC) of India advocated for the term to include other types of hazardous cleaning.

There is a very clear gender division of various types of work that is called manual scavenging in India. The cleaning of dry toilets and carrying of waste to points of disposal is generally done by women, while men are involved in the cleaning of septic tanks and sewers. There is an economic reason for this distribution - the municipality employs workers to clean sewers and septic tanks and hence the salary is better. Cleaning private toilets, on the other hand, pays little and is therefore handed over to the women. The women involved are referred to differently - 'dabbu-wali' in Bengal, 'balti-wali' in Kanpur, 'tina-wali in Bihar, tokri-wali in Punjab and Haryana, 'thottikar' in Andhra Pradesh and Karnataka, 'paaki' or 'peeti' in Odisha, 'vaatal' in Kashmir. These names directly refer to the tools (dabbu, balti, tokri) used by the women to carry waste or dustbin (thottikar) or excreta (paaki, peeti).

Manual scavenging is done with basic tools like thin boards and either buckets or baskets lined with sacking and carried on the head. Due to the hazardous nature of the job, many of the workers have related health problems. Scavengers risk suffering from respiratory disorders, typhoid, and cholera. Scavengers may also contract skin and blood infections, eye and respiratory infections due to exposure to pollutants, skeletal disorder caused by the lifting of heavy storage containers, and burns due to coming into contact with hazardous chemicals combined with waste. The data obtained by Safai Karmachari Andolan for 2017-2018 found the average age of deceased sewer workers to be around 32 years — they do not reach the age of retirement and the family often loses their breadwinner early.

Not all forms of dry toilets involve "manual scavenging" to empty them, but only those that require unsafe handling of raw excreta. If on the other hand the excreta is already treated or pre-treated in the dry toilet itself, as is the case for composting toilets, and urine-diverting dry toilets for example, then emptying these types of toilets is not classified as "manual scavenging". Container-based sanitation is another system that does not require manual scavenging to function even though it does involve the emptying of excreta from containers.

Also, emptying the pits of twin-pit toilets is not classified as manual scavenging in India, as if used and emptied appropriately, the excreta is already treated.

The International Labour Organization describes three forms of manual scavenging in India:

- Removal of human excrement from public streets and "dry latrines" (meaning simple pit latrines without a water seal, but not dry toilets in general)
- Cleaning septic tanks
- Cleaning gutters and sewers

Manual cleaning of railway lines of excreta dropped from toilets of trains is another form of manual scavenging in India.

The Hindi phrase safai karamchari defines not only "manual scavengers" but also other sanitation workers.

== History ==
The practice of manual scavenging in India dates back to ancient times. According to the contents of sacred scriptures and other literature, scavenging by some specific castes of India has existed since the beginning of civilization. One of the fifteen duties of slaves enumerated in Naradiya Samhita was of manual scavenging. This continues during the Buddhist and Maurya period also.

Scholars have suggested that the Mughal women with purdah required enclosed toilets that needed to be scavenged. It is pointed out that the Bhangis (Chuhra) share some of the clan names with Rajputs, and propose that the Bhangis are descendants of those captured in wars. There are many legends about the origin of Bhangis, who have traditionally served as manual scavengers. One of them, associated with Lal Begi Bhangis, describes the origin of Bhangis from Mehtar.

Manual scavenging is historically linked to the caste system in India. Not only cleaning of toilets, but all types of cleaning jobs are considered lowly in India. The elites assigned the most lowly and polluting jobs for members of the Dalit community. The caste-based assignment of cleaning jobs can be traced back to the revival of the Brahmanical order during the Gupta period, considered the golden era in the history of the Indian sub-continent. The workers usually belonged to the Balmiki (or Valmiki) or Hela (or Mehtar) subcastes; considered at the bottom of the hierarchy within the Dalit community itself.

Before the passage of the 1993 Act that prohibit employment for manual scavengers, local governments employed 'scavengers' to clean dry latrines in private houses and community or public facilities. These jobs were institutionalised by the British. In London, cesspits containing human waste were called 'gongs' or 'jakes' and men employed to clean them 'Gongfermours' or 'Gongfarmers'. They emptied such pits only in the night and dumped it outside the city. They had designated areas to live and were allowed to use only certain roads and by lanes to carry the waste. The British organized systems for removing the excreta and employed Bhangis as manual scavengers. They also brought Dalits working as agricultural labourers in the rural areas for the job in urban areas. This formal employment of Bhangis for human waste management and Chamars for animal carcasses disposal by the British reinforced the caste based assignment. Even today, sanitation department jobs are almost unofficially 100% reserved for people from the Scheduled caste groups.

== Current prevalence ==
Despite the passage of two pieces of legislation, the prevalence of manual scavenging is an open secret. According to the Socio Economic Caste Census 2011, 180,657 households within India are engaged in manual scavenging for a livelihood. The 2011 Census of India found 794,000 cases of manual scavenging across India. The state of Maharashtra, with 63,713, tops the list with the largest number of households working as manual scavengers, followed by the states of Madhya Pradesh, Uttar Pradesh, Tripura and Karnataka. Manual scavenging still survives in parts of India without proper sewage systems or safe fecal sludge management practices. It is thought to be prevalent in Maharashtra, Gujarat, Madhya Pradesh, Uttar Pradesh, and Rajasthan.

In March 2014, the Supreme Court of India declared that there were 96 lakh (9.6 million) dry latrines being manually emptied but the exact number of manual scavengers is disputed – official figures put it at less than 700,000. An estimate in 2018 put the number of "sanitation workers" in India at 5 million with 50% of them being women. However, not all sanitation workers are manual scavengers. Another estimate from 2018 put the figure at one million manual scavengers, stating that the number is "unknown and declining" and that 90% of them are women.

The biggest violator of this law in India is the Indian Railways where many train carriages have toilets dropping the excreta from trains on the tracks and who employ scavengers to clean the tracks manually. The situation is being improved in 2018 by the addition of on-train treatment systems for the toilet waste.

Bezwada Wilson, an activist, at the forefront in the battle to eradicate manual scavenging, argues that the practice continues due to its casteist nature. He also argues that the failure of implementation of the 1993 Act is a collective failure of the leadership, judiciary, the administration, and the Dalit movements to address the concerns of the most marginalized community. Unlike infrastructure projects like metros, the issue receives little or no priority from the Government and hence the deadline to comply with the 1993 Act has been continuously postponed. An example that demonstrates the apathy of the government is the fact that none of the Rupees 100 Crore (1,000 million) allocated in the budgets for financial years 2011-12 and 2012-13 was spent. Such is the stigma attached to manual scavengers that even professionals who work for their emancipation get labelled. For example, prolific investigative journalists like Pragya Akhilesh, who is one of the most notable sanitation crusaders in India, was labelled 'Toiletwoman of India'. Bhasha Singh also was labelled a 'manual scavenging journalist'.

=== Threats and harassment ===
In India, women who practice manual scavenging face pressure from their respective communities if they miss a day since toilets are cleaned every day. Many women have no choice but to turn up to clean the toilets. The practical requirement that they do not miss a day prevents them from pursuing alternate occupations like agricultural labor. And in the event that they are able to find the means and support to stop manual scavenging, women still face extreme pressure from the community.

== Initiatives for eradication ==
=== Legislation ===
In the late 1950s, freedom fighter G. S. Lakshman Iyer banned manual scavenging when he was the chairman of Gobichettipalayam Municipality, which became the first local body to ban it officially. Sanitation is a State subject as per entry 6 of the Constitution. Under this, in February 2013 Delhi announced that they were banning manual scavenging, making them the first state in India to do so. District magistrates are responsible for ensuring that there are no manual scavengers working in their district. Within three years of the ruling municipalities, railways and cantonments were required to make sufficient sanitary latrines available.

But by using Article 252 of the constitution which empowers Parliament to legislate for two or more States by consent and adoption of such legislation by any other State, the Government of India has enacted various laws. The continuance of such discriminatory practice is violation of ILO's Convention 111 (Discrimination in Employment and Occupation). The United Nations human rights chief welcomed in 2013 the movement in India to eradicate manual scavenging.

In 2007 the Self Employment Scheme for Rehabilitation of Manual Scavengers was passed to help in transition to other occupations.

==== Employment of Manual Scavengers and Construction of Dry Latrines (Prohibition) Act, 1993 ====
After six states passed resolutions requesting the Central Government to frame a law, "The Employment of Manual Scavengers and Construction of Dry Latrines (Prohibition) Act, 1993", drafted by the Ministry of Urban Development under the Narasimha Rao government, was passed by Parliament in 1993. The act punishes the employment of scavengers or the construction of dry (non-flush) latrines with imprisonment for up to one year and/or a fine of Rs 2,000. No convictions were obtained under the law during the 20 years it was in force.

==== Prohibition of Employment as Manual Scavengers and their Rehabilitation Act, 2013 ====
Government has passed the new legislation in September 2013 and issued Government notification for the same. In December, 2013 Government also formulated Rules-2013 called as "The Prohibition of Employment as Manual Scavengers and their Rehabilitation Rules 2013" or "M.S. Rules 2013". The hearing on 27 March 2014 was held on manual scavenging of writ petition number 583 of 2003, and Supreme Court has issued final orders and case is disposed of with various directions to the Government. The broad objectives of the act are to eliminate unsanitary latrines, prohibit the employment of manual scavengers and the hazardous manual cleaning of sewer and septic tanks, and to maintain a survey of manual scavengers and their rehabilitation.

==== Prohibition of Employment as Manual Scavengers and their Rehabilitation (Amendment) Bill, 2020 ====
The Bill calls for a complete mechanization of cleaning sewers and septic tanks.

=== Activism ===
In India in the 1970s, Bindeshwar Pathak introduced his "Sulabh" concept for building and managing public toilets in India, which has introduced hygienic and well-managed public toilet systems. Activist Bezwada Wilson founded a group in 1994, Safai Karmachari Andolan, to campaign for the demolition of then newly illegal 'dry latrines' (pit latrines) and the abolition of manual scavenging. Despite the efforts of Wilson and other activists, the practice persists two decades later. In July 2008 "Mission Sanitation" was a fashion show held by the United Nations as part of its International Year of Sanitation. On the runway were 36 previous workers, called scavengers, and top models to help bring awareness of the issue of manual scavenging.

The Movement for Scavenger Community (MSC) is an NGO founded in 2009 by Vimal Kumar with young people, social activists, and like-minded people from the scavenger community. MSC is committed to working towards the social and economic empowerment of the scavenger community through the medium of education.

The "Campaign for Dignity" (Garima Abhiyan) in Madhya Pradesh in India has assisted more than 20,000 women to stop doing manual scavenging as an occupation.

Pragya Akhilesh is an investigative journalist who is called as the 'sanitation woman of India' for her prolific contribution highlighting SBM's irregularities focusing on merely infrastructure building rather than protecting the rights of thousands of sanitation workers in India. Since 2010 she has highlighted the government's failure to recognise the labour movement of sanitation workers and the failure to eradicate and rehabilitate manual scavengers in India.

== Other countries ==
Historically, manual emptying of toilets also took place in Europe. The excreta was known as night soil and in Tudor England the workers were called gong farmers.

In Pakistan, municipalities mostly rely on Christian sweepers. In the city of Karachi, sweepers keep the sewer system flowing, using their bare hands to unclog crumbling drainpipes of feces, plastic bags and hazardous hospital refuse, part of the 1,750 million litres of waste the city's 20 million residents produce daily. Christians make up a small percentage of Pakistan's population, and they fill majority of the sweeper jobs. When Karachi's municipality tried to recruit Muslims to unclog gutters, they refused to get down into the sewers, instead sweeping the streets. The job was left to Christians and lower-caste Hindus.

In Sierra Leone, waste storage practices in homes are poor, adding to collection difficulties. Unsorted waste is often stored in old plastic bags and leaky buckets instead of plastic bag-lined bins. Like most African countries, waste collection in Sierra Leone is a problem. Garbage collected by collection workers, who are not provided with personal protective equipment like gloves, from communal skips is moved straight for the city's two disposal sites. Scavengers try to earn a living from scouring through rotting rubbish, plastic bags and raw sewage for discarded things they can sell.

== See also ==
- Sanitation worker
- Swachh Bharat Abhiyan (Clean India Mission)
- Waste collector
- Water supply and sanitation in India
