= Bucket toilet =

Basic form of a dry toilet with a bucket

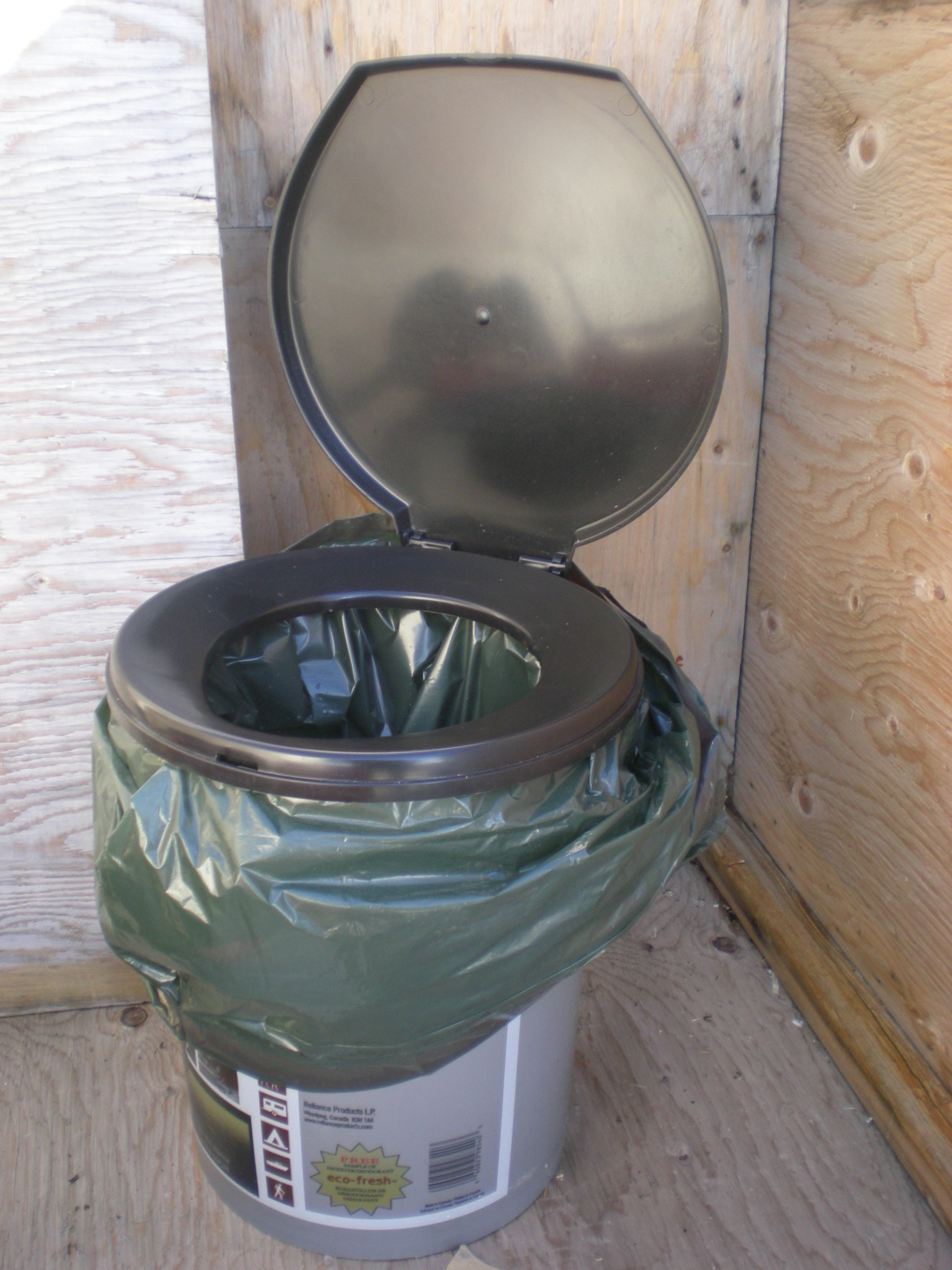
A plastic bucket fitted with a toilet seat for comfort and a lid and plastic bag for waste containment

A bucket toilet is a basic form of a dry toilet whereby a bucket (pail) is used to collect excreta. Usually, feces and urine are collected together in the same bucket, leading to odor issues. The bucket may be situated inside a dwelling, or in a nearby small structure (an outhouse).

Where people do not have access to improved sanitation – particularly in low-income urban areas of developing countries – an unimproved bucket toilet may be better than open defecation. They can play a temporary role in emergency sanitation, e.g. after earthquakes. However, the unimproved bucket toilet may carry significant health risks compared to an improved sanitation system. The bucket toilet system, with collection organised by the municipality, used to be widespread in wealthy countries; in Australia it persisted into the second half of the 20th century.

Once the basic bucket toilet has been "improved", it evolves into a number of different systems, which are more correctly referred to as either container-based sanitation systems, composting toilets, or urine-diverting dry toilets.

== Applications ==
=== Unimproved toilets ===
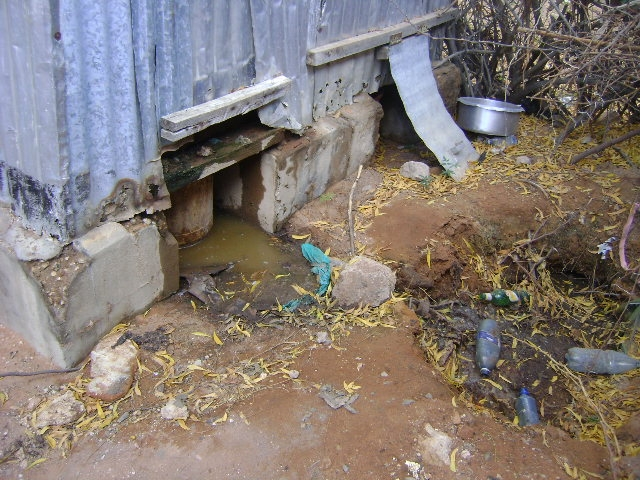
Access point for collection of buckets in Kenya

Bucket toilets are used in households and even in health care facilities in some low- and middle- income countries where people do not have access to improved sanitation.

In those settings, bucket toilets are more likely to be used without a liner, or the liner is not removed each time the bucket is emptied. This is because the users cannot afford to regularly discard suitably sized, sturdy liners. Instead, the users may place some dry material in the base of the bucket (newspaper, sawdust, leaves, straw, or similar) in order to facilitate easier emptying.

=== Cold climates ===
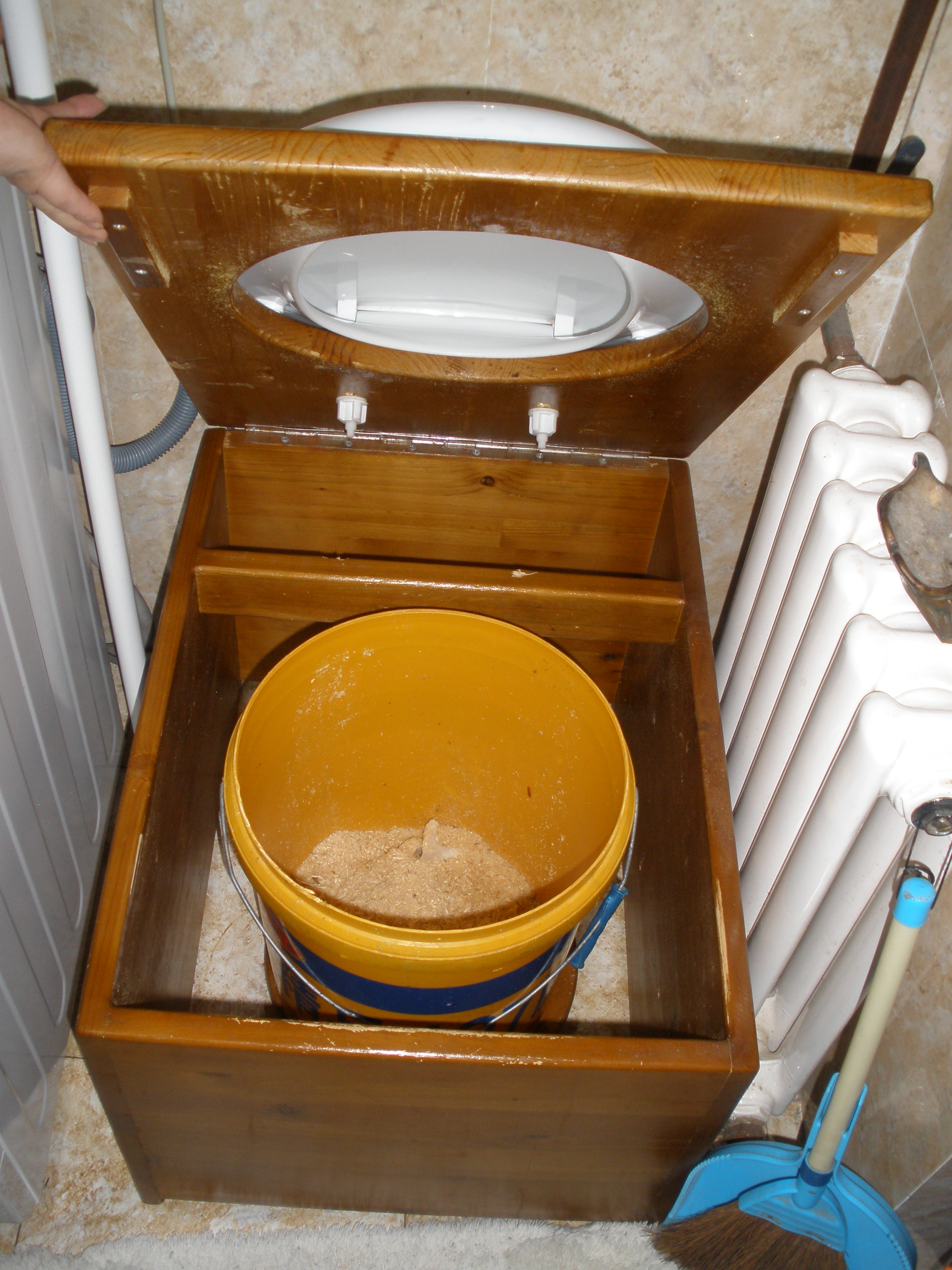
Inside view of a bucket toilet in Ulaan Baatar, Mongolia. The bucket has a layer of sawdust at the bottom.

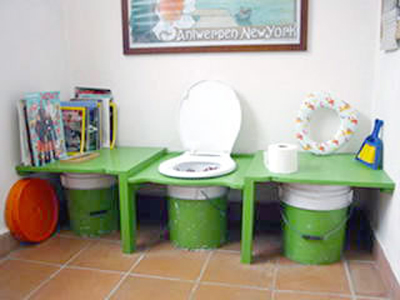
Bucket toilet with spare buckets stored on either side.

Bucket toilets have been historically common in cold climates where installing running water can be difficult and expensive and subject to freezing-related pipe breakage, for example in Alaska and rural areas of Canada and Russia.

=== Emergencies ===
In natural disasters and other emergencies, the portability of bucket latrines can make them a useful part of an appropriate emergency response, especially where pit latrines cannot be isolated from floodwater or groundwater (potentially leading to groundwater pollution) and where the contents can be safely disposed into sanitary systems, taking measures to avoid contact with the contents. Different organizations give advice on how to build bucket toilets in case of emergency. The Twin Bucket Emergency Toilet system (a two bucket system), for example, has been developed in Christchurch, New Zealand following their infrastructure destroying earthquake in 2011. The system has been endorsed by the Portland Bureau of Emergency Management. It is promoted by the volunteer advocacy group PHLUSH (Public Hygiene Lets Us Stay Human) for reasons of safety, affordability, and matching ecological sanitation principles.

== Usage and maintenance ==
The bucket is emptied when it becomes full or emits excessive foul odor; usually once a day for large families, and about once a week for smaller families. Some sources say that it averages once per week per person per five-gallon bucket. The quantity of excreta varies widely depending on the amount of fiber in the local diet. If the bucket has a liner, then emptying is more hygienic in areas with poor water access for cleaning the collection chamber (bucket) than without a liner, as the bag could be sealed with a knot and the bucket would remain fairly clean.

To minimize offensive odors and prevent the spread of disease, the material in the bucket can be covered with some covering material after each use, such as quick lime, wood ash, finely crushed charcoal or fine sawdust (similarly to the operation of a urine-diverting dry toilet).

=== Disposal or treatment and reuse of collected excreta ===
When the bucket is full, it can be covered with a lid and stored away until the collected waste can either be disposed of (e.g., by burial) or treated for safe reuse, e.g., via composting the material. Some municipalities, accept double/triple bagged waste in the trash can, much like the disposing of cat litter.

== Health aspects ==
An unimproved, open bucket in which excreta are not covered by carbon matter does not offer much protection to the user from the pathogens in the feces, which can lead to significant health risks. Flies can access the contents unless it is kept securely covered (e.g., by a toilet lid and/or adequate carbon matter). There is also the risk that the bucket can tip over and spill its contents; an improved system encloses the bucket inside something which is securely bolted to the floor. Unhygienic emptying and disposal practices add further opportunities for pathogens to be spread, for example, if the bucket is not cleaned after each use or if a liner is not used.

For these reasons, unimproved bucket toilets were not considered as improved sanitation systems according to WHO and UNICEF for monitoring access to basic sanitation as part of Goal 7 of the Millennium Development Goals. At the time of these goals, IAPMO had not yet published new standards for acceptable improved bucket toilet procedure.

== Upgraded options ==
=== Two bucket system ===
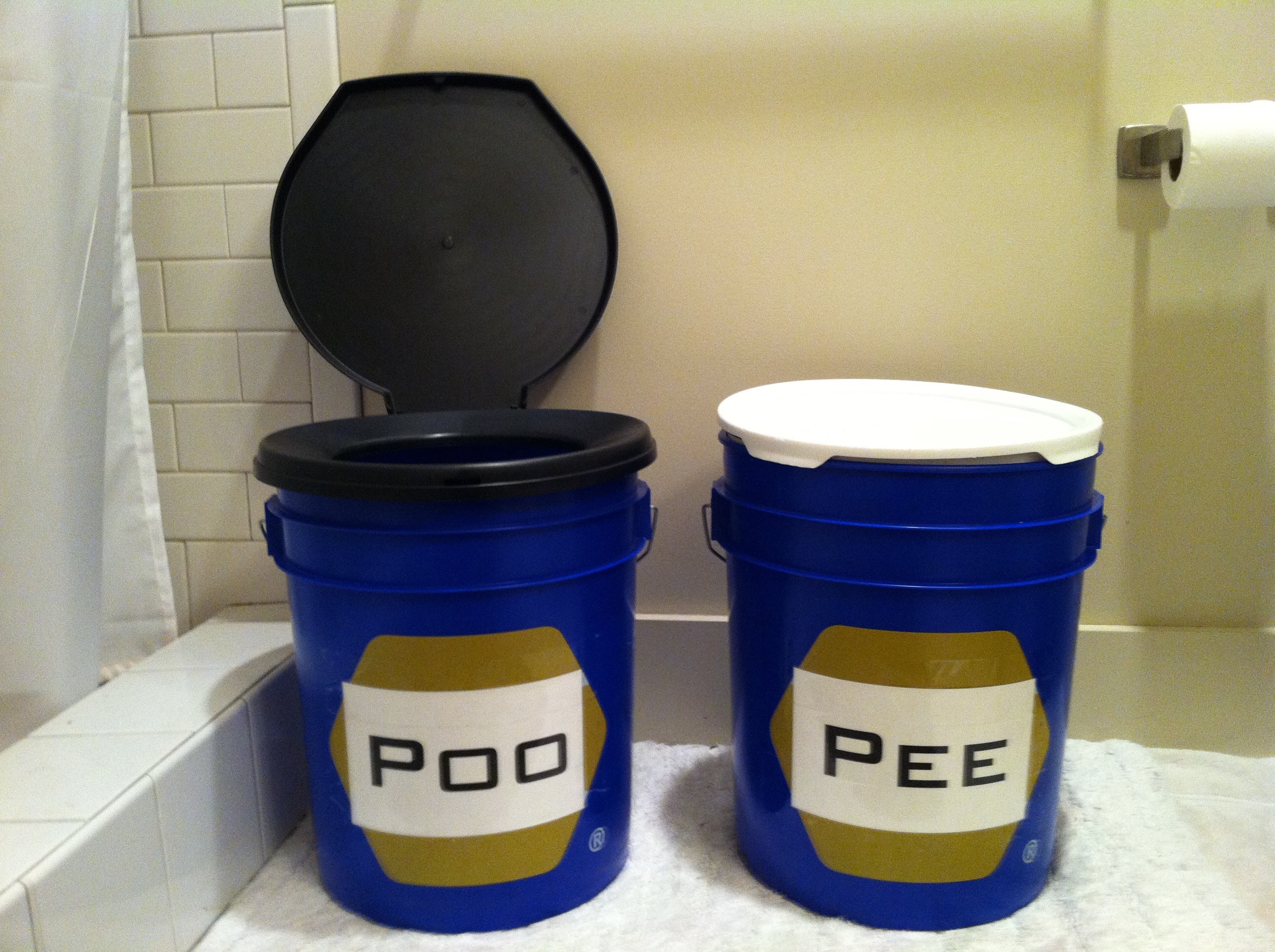
A two bucket urine diversion system: one bucket is for urine, the other one for feces.

For application in emergencies (e.g. after earthquakes), it is possible to use two buckets (also known as "twin bucket toilet"): one for urine, the other one for feces and soiled toilet paper. The Wellington Region Emergency Management Office recommends strong 15–20 litres (3.3–4.4 imp gal; 4.0–5.3 US gal) buckets or pails and the use of dry mulch material that can consist of sawdust, dry leaves, soil, or shredded newspaper. The bottom of the "urine bucket" should be covered with water and emptied every day. The content is then poured onto a disused green space after diluting the urine with water. The bottom of the "feces bucket" should be covered with dry mulch. After every use, a handful of dry mulch should be used to cover the feces in order to keep it as dry as possible. After the bucket is full, it should be emptied into a hole in the ground or into a separate large storage bin. Since feces contain pathogens, they should be handled with caution.

=== Composting toilets ===
Unimproved bucket toilets can be upgraded to become improved bucket toilets, where some composting starts in the bucket itself but most of it takes place in an external composter.

An upgraded system may consist of a bucket under a wooden frame supporting a toilet seat and lid, possibly lined with a biodegradable bag, but many are simply a large bucket without a bag. Newspaper, cardboard, straw, sawdust, or other absorbent materials are often layered into the bucket toilet. Improved bucket toilets also have an associated composting chamber, with well-defined specifications for how to manage the manure as it composts.

=== Container-based toilets ===
Container-based sanitation systems have superficial similarities with bucket toilets but use a rigorous approach regarding safety of the user and of the staff who is handling the collected excreta.

== History ==
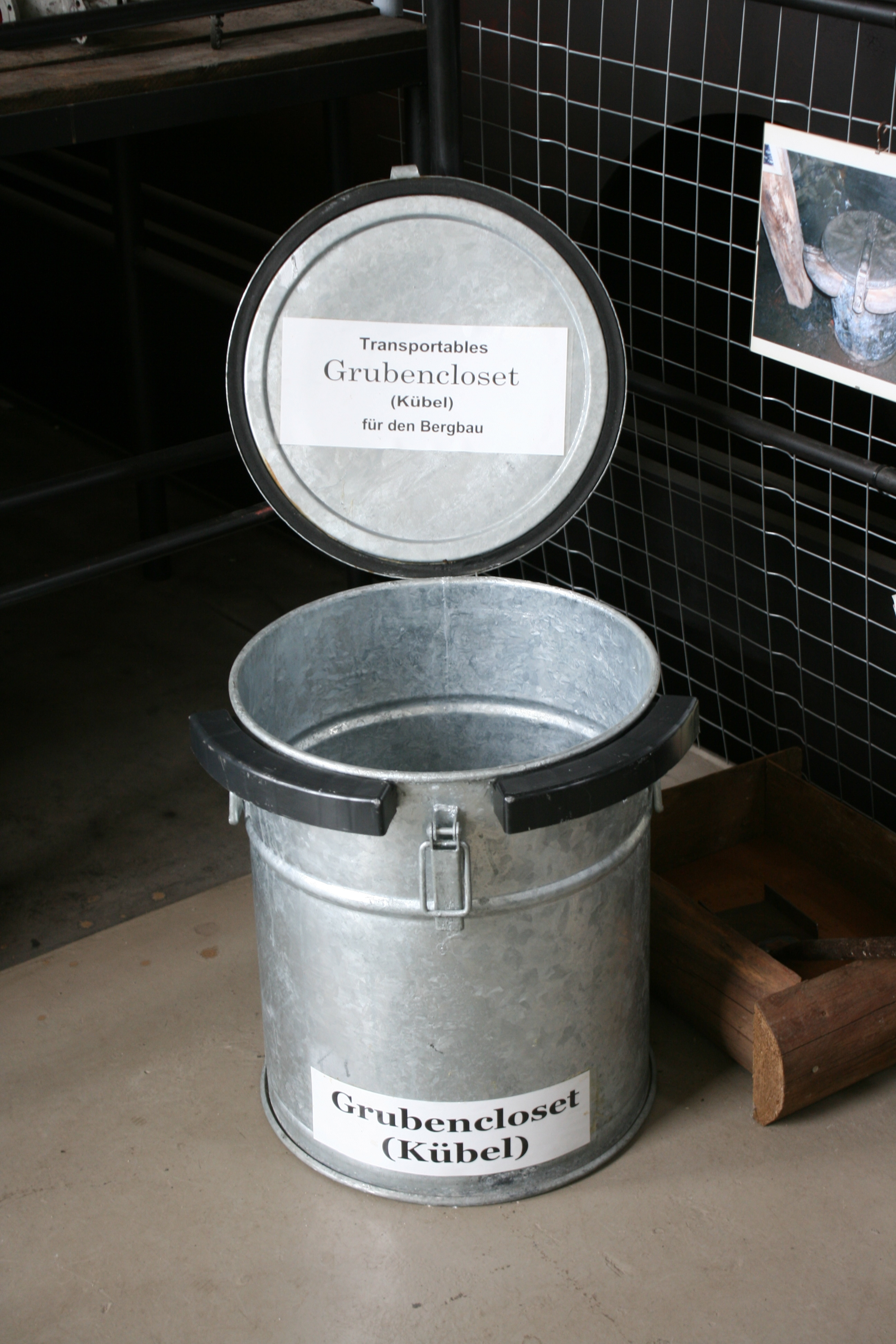
Bucket toilet historically used at a mine near Gelsenkirchen, Germany

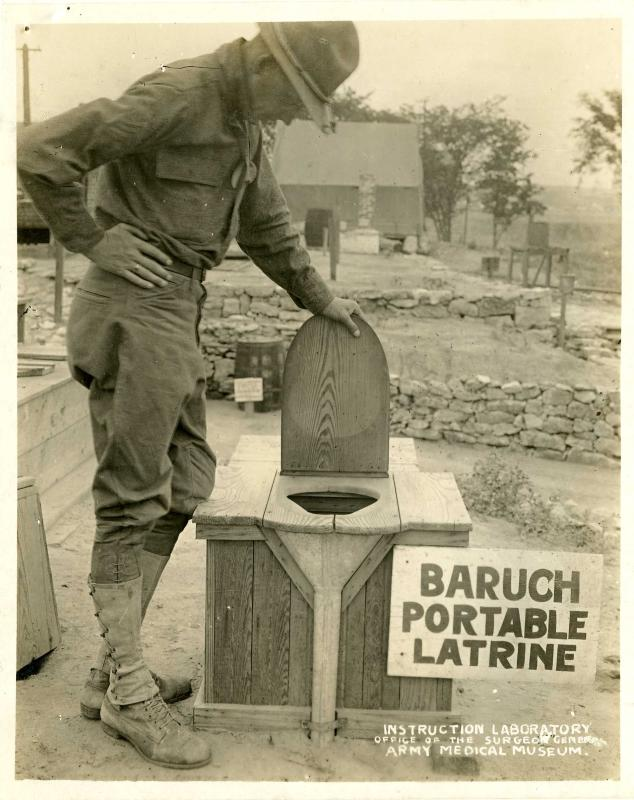
Baruch portable latrine, US Army, World War One

Although bucket toilet systems are now rare in developed countries, particularly where sewers are common, basic forms of sanitation were widely used until the mid 20th century. The pail closet was the term in Victorian England for a bucket (pail) in an outhouse. The municipality employed workers, often known as "nightmen" (from night soil, the euphemism for excreta), to empty and replace the buckets. This system was associated in particular with the English town of Rochdale, to the extent that it was described as the "Rochdale System" of sanitation. It persisted in England in some rural schools into the 1960s.

Twentieth-century books report that similar systems were in operation in parts of France and elsewhere in continental Europe. In Germany, bucket toilets were used by workers in some mines up to the 20th century.

The system of municipal collection was widespread in Australia; "dunny cans" persisted well into the second half of the twentieth century. Because the population was so dispersed, it was difficult to install sewerage. Tar, creosote, and disinfectant kept the smell down. Academic George Seddon claimed that "the typical Australian back yard in the cities and country towns" had, throughout the first half of the twentieth century, "a dunny against the back fence, so that the pan could be collected from the dunny lane through a trap-door"

Armies used to use "thunderboxes" or portable latrines.

== Examples ==
=== Ghana ===
Bucket latrines were used extensively in the Kumasi Metropolis of Ghana since colonial times. They are still used in some households in the metropolis. Since the mid-1980s, the Kumasi Metropolitan Assembly has actively discouraged bucket latrines and has stopped the emptying services that was provided by the assembly.

=== Kenya ===
In the region of Wajir, few residents have access to improved sanitation. Because of the high water table, pit latrines are impossible to use, and instead bucket toilets are common. By the time the waste collectors come, the bucket toilets are often already overflowing. These unhygienic circumstances can lead to frequent outbreaks of diarrhea.

=== Namibia ===
Due to high poverty, some inhabitants still use bucket toilets.

=== United States ===
Bucket toilets are common in many rural villages in the state of Alaska, such as those in the Bethel area of the Yukon–Kuskokwim Delta, and are found throughout the rural regions of the state.

Bucket toilets are used especially where permafrost makes the installation of septic systems or outhouses impractical. Bucket toilets are promoted for cases of emergency, especially in regions with risk of earthquakes.

=== Canada ===
They were also relatively common in the Yukon, Northwest Territories, and Nunavut of Canada, but by now they have mostly been replaced with indoor plumbing and sewage pump-out tanks. They are still found in summer cabins where the use of a sewage tank is impractical.

=== South Africa ===
In South Africa, bucket toilets – frequently referred to as the "bucket system" – are still used in 2016 in some low-income communities as a relic of the Apartheid era. During that era, the poor, predominantly black townships generally did not get proper sanitation. The term "bucket toilet" or "bucket system" is nowadays very much stigmatized in South Africa and politically charged. Protests against bucket toilets are still occurring. As of 2012, 5.3 percent of households in South Africa either had no toilets, or used bucket toilets.

The South African government set up a bucket eradication programme in order to eradicate all pre-1994 sanitation buckets from the formal townships and replace them with sanitary sewers and other sanitation systems. According to the Department of Water Affairs & Forestry, in 2005 the bucket sanitation backlog in formal townships was estimated at 252,254 bucket toilets. In 2009, the majority of the pre-1994 buckets were eradicated. However, this change has not been completed throughout the country. In 2013 the use of bucket systems was still common in the Free State, Eastern Cape, Western Cape, and Northern Cape provinces.

A study in 2012 evaluated South Africa's bucket eradication programme and highlighted the following weaknesses: "One-size-fits-all" toilets were constructed that did not meet the special sanitation needs of vulnerable groups; health and hygiene education and user education had not been integrated; community participation barely took place; and operation and maintenance of water treatment works were neglected, as were water conservation and water demand management.

=== India ===
The number of bucket toilets still in use in India is unknown but figures on "manual scavenging" can give some indication of the practice: Manual scavenging is a term used in Indian English for the removal of untreated human excreta from bucket toilets or pit latrines. The workers, called scavengers, rarely have any personal protective equipment. According to Socio Economic Caste Census 2011, 180,657 households are engaged in manual scavenging for a livelihood. The 2011 Census of India found 794,000 cases of manual scavenging across India.

=== UK ===
Prior to the introduction of mains sewerage, most houses had a Pail closet which is a bucket toilet in a dedicated outbuilding. In larger towns and cities a bucket collection service was operated, while in rural areas a 'lat pit' or burial was common. Local Authority bucket collection services were discontinued in the post war years as sewers were extended to nearly all built up areas, and most rural locations installed either septic tanks or cesspits

== Society and culture ==
=== Alternative names ===
In some regions, the term "honey bucket" is used (for example in Alaska), see also honeywagon (a vehicle which collects human excreta for disposal elsewhere). The term "bucket latrine" is also in use. In the UK Pail closet was also a common description.

== See also ==
- Dry toilet, a toilet that does not have a water seal (unlike a flush toilet), for example, a composting toilet, pit latrine, urine-diverting dry toilet, freezing toilet
- Flying toilet, a euphemism for a plastic bag that is used to collect human feces and then discarded into the environment
- Portable toilet
- Slopping out, the manual emptying of human waste when prison cells are unlocked in the morning (associated with old British prisons)
