= Latrine =

Toilet or an even simpler facility that is used as a toilet within a sanitation system

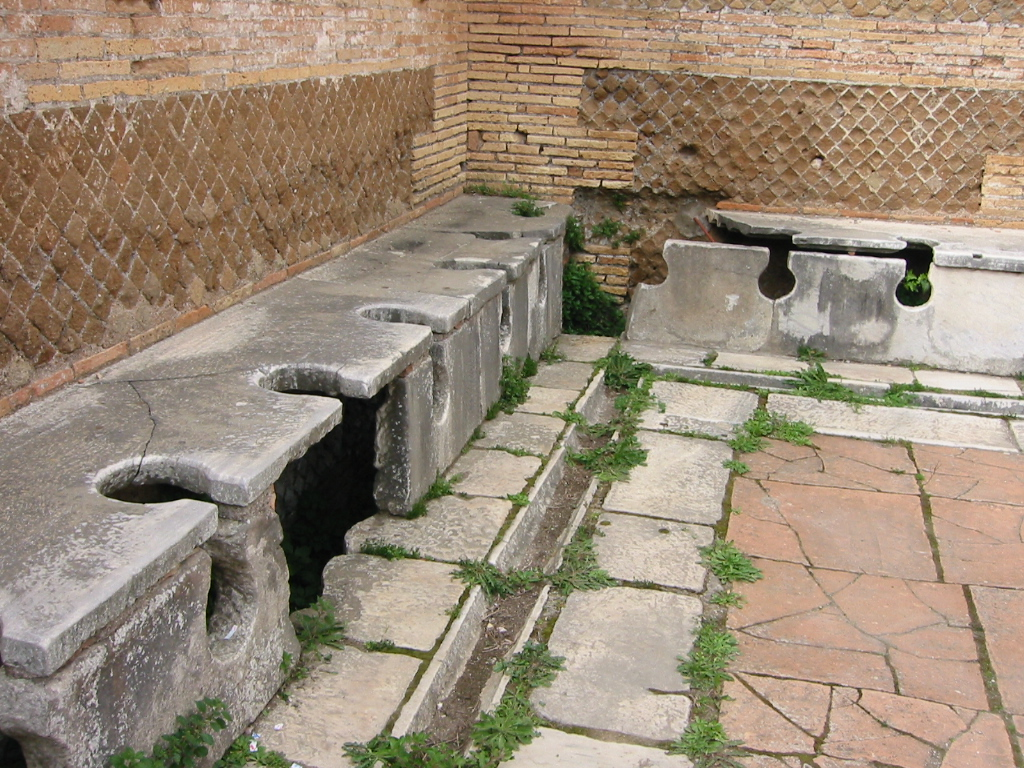
Roman public latrine found in the excavations of Ostia Antica; unlike modern installations, the Romans saw no need to provide privacy for individual users.

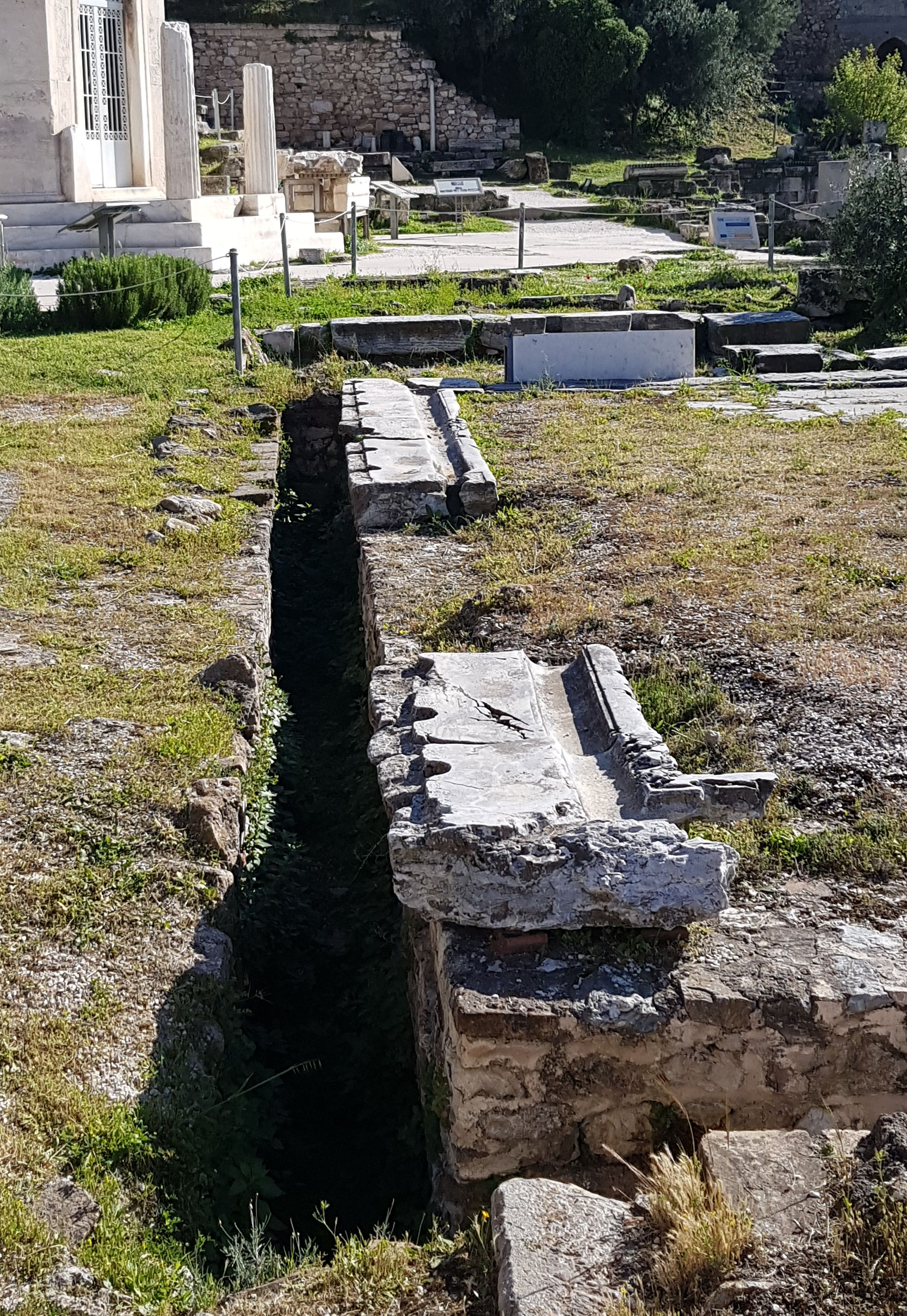
Public Latrine at Athens' Roman Forum site

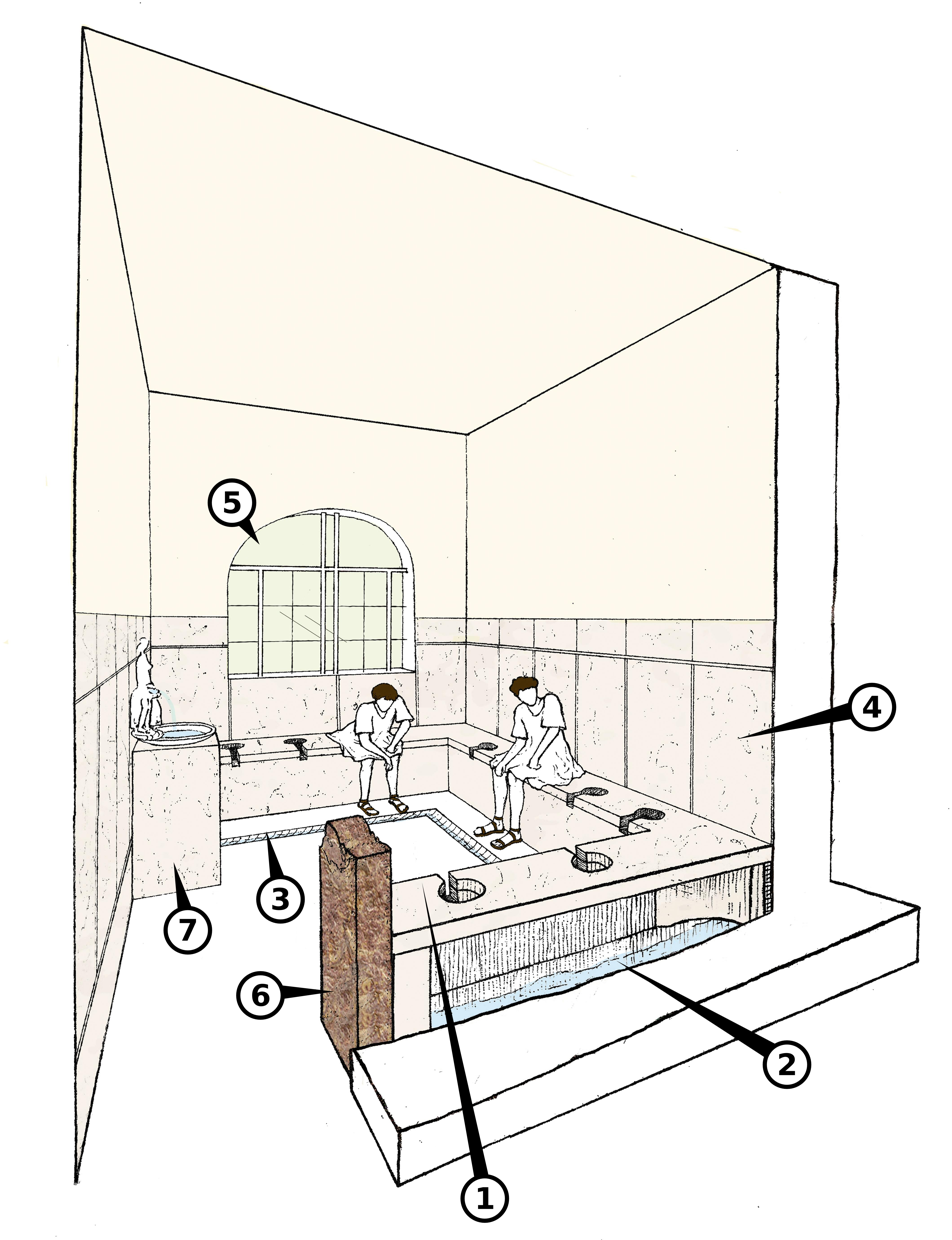
Roman latrines in Els Munts villa at Altafulla in Tarragonès, Spain. 1) Bench 2) Main water channel 3) Front water channel 4) Wall 5) Window 6) Divider 7) Washbasin

A latrine is a toilet or an even simpler facility that is used as a toilet within a sanitation system. For example, it can be a communal trench in the earth in a camp to be used as emergency sanitation, a hole in the ground (pit latrine), or more advanced designs, including pour-flush systems.

The term "latrine" is still commonly used in military parlance, and less so in civilian usage except in emergency sanitation situations. Nowadays, the word "toilet" is more commonly used than "latrine", except when referring to simple systems like "pit latrines" or "trench latrines".

The use of latrines was a major advance in sanitation over more basic practices such as open defecation, and helped control the spread of many waterborne diseases. However, unsafe defecation in unimproved latrines still remained a widespread problem by the end of 2020, with more than 3 billion people affected (46 % of the global population). Eradication of this public health threat is one of the United Nations' 17 goals for sustainable development.

== Terminology ==
The word "latrine" is derived from the Latin lavatrina, meaning bath. Today it is commonly used in the term "pit latrine". It has the connotation of something being less advanced and less hygienic than a standard toilet. It is typically used to describe communal facilities, such as the shallow-trench latrines used in emergency sanitation situations, e.g. after earthquakes, floods or other natural disasters.

== Types ==
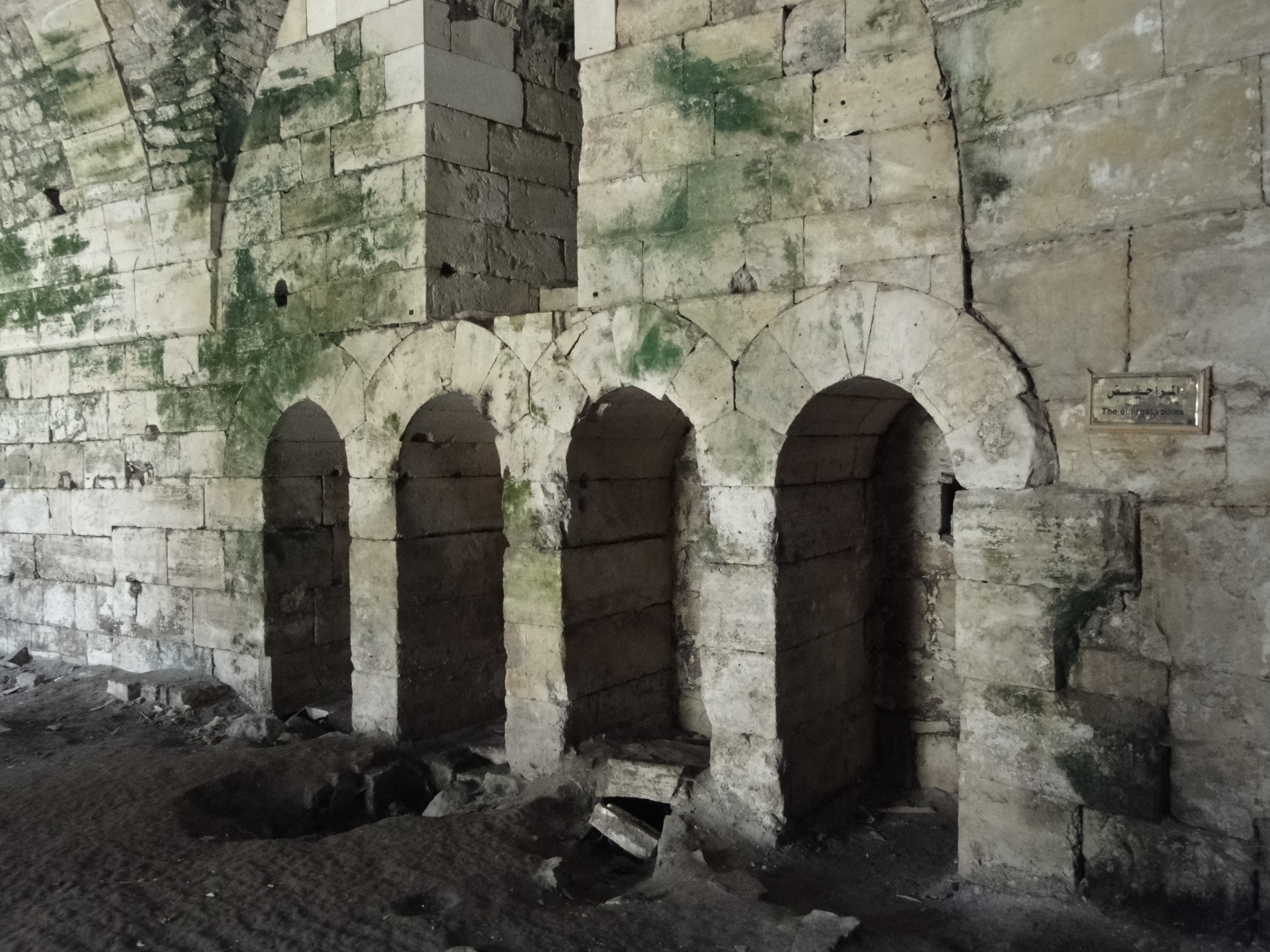
Latrines of Krak des Chevaliers in Syria

Many forms of latrine technology have been used, from very simple to more complex. The more sophisticated the system, the more likely that the term "toilet" is used instead of "latrine".

=== Pit latrine ===
A pit latrine is a simple and inexpensive toilet, minimally defined as a hole (pit) in the ground. More sophisticated pit latrines may include a floor plate, or ventilation to reduce odor and fly and mosquito breeding (called ventilated improved pit latrine or "VIP latrine"). Many military units, if intended for extended use, place basic shelters and seating over the pits. A pit is typically sited well away from any water sources to minimize possible contamination. After prolonged use, a pit is typically buried.

Other types of pit latrines may include the Reed Odourless Earth Closet, the arborloo or treebog (very simple types of composting toilet), or the twin pit pour-flush pit latrine, popularized by Sulabh International.

The shelter that covers such a pit latrine is known in some varieties of English as an outhouse.

=== Trench latrine ===
In a location without longer term sanitation infrastructure, such as for emergency sanitation, a trench latrine is a workable solution. It typically consists of a pit or a trench in the ground, 4 to 5 feet (1.2 to 1.5 m) deep and 4 to 20 feet (1.2 to 6.1 m) long.

==== Slit-trench latrine ====
A slit-trench latrine consists of a relatively shallow trench which is narrow enough to stand with one leg on either side (see defecation postures). This type of latrine is used either by squatting, with the users' legs straddling the pit, or by various arrangements for sitting or leaning against a support structure. Such support may be simply a log, plank, branch or similar arrangement placed at right angles to the long axis of the pit. This type of latrine is not commonly found in developing countries, but can be used for emergency sanitation.

==== Shallow-trench latrine ====
The shallow-trench latrine is similar to the slit-trench latrine but is wider (20–30 cm or 7.9–11.8 in wide) than the latter. It is also shallow, with a depth of about 15 cm (5.9 in). This type of latrine is often used in the initial phases of emergencies and is a simple improvement on open defecation fields. A rule of thumb in emergency sanitation provision is to allow 0.25 m^{2} (2.7 sq ft) of land per person per day. This means 2,500 m^{2} (27,000 sq ft) per 10,000 people per day, or nearly two hectares per week. Men's and women's areas should always be separated.

=== Aqua privy ===
An aqua privy is essentially a small septic tank located directly below a dry toilet squatting pan or bowl which has a drop pipe extending below the liquid level in the tank to form a simple water seal to minimise odors.

=== Most basic ===
- Campers refer to a cathole – a one-use, shallow scrape.
- Bucket

== See also ==
- Emergency sanitation
- Reredorter, medieval monastic latrine
