= Sustainable Organic Integrated Livelihoods =

American nonprofit organization

Sustainable Organic Integrated Livelihoods (SOIL)
- Founded: 2006
- Founder: Dr. Sasha Kramer, Sarah Brownell
- Type: 501(c)(3)
- Purpose: Ecological sanitation
- Location: Haiti
- Region served: Haiti
- Key people: Sasha Kramer
- Website: www.oursoil.org

Sustainable Organic Integrated Livelihoods or SOIL is an American nonprofit developmental aid organization co-founded by Sasha Kramer and Sarah Brownell in 2006. Its goal is to develop integrated approaches to the problems of poverty, poor public health, agricultural productivity, and environmental destruction in Haiti. SOIL's efforts have focused on the community-identified priority of increasing access to ecological sanitation, where human wastes are converted into compost. More than 20,000 Haitians are currently using SOIL ecological sanitation toilets.

== Programs ==
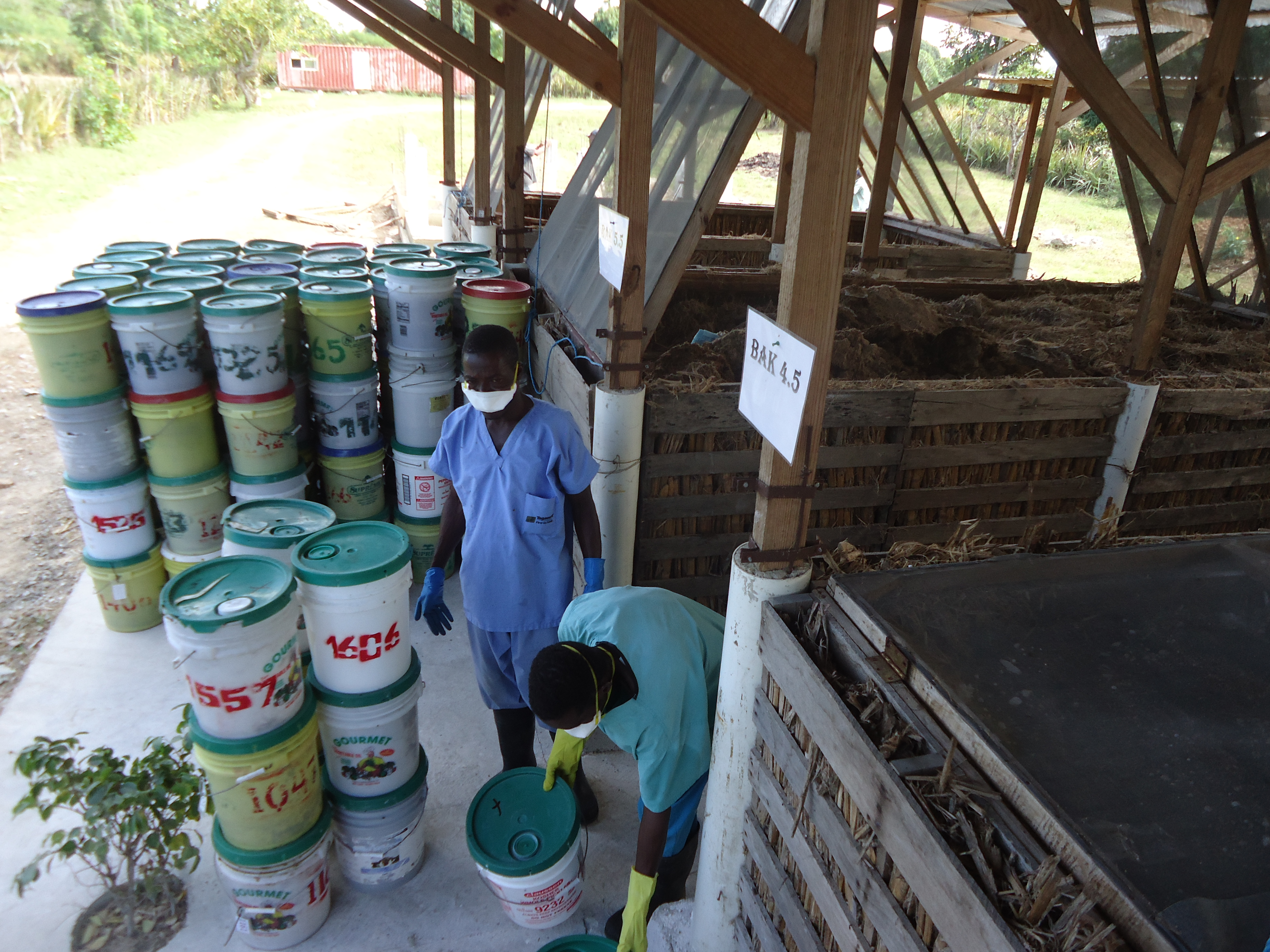
Emptying buckets of waste at the SOIL composting facility in Cap-Haitien, January 2014

- EkoLakay. EkoLakay is a container-based household sanitation service in Cap-Haitien and Port-au-Prince. Clients pay a low monthly service fee of around US$4. The service includes toilet rental, the provision of at least one bucket of carbon-based cover material each week, as well as weekly pick up of buckets full of wastes. SOIL designs and builds low-cost ecological sanitation toilets made from locally available materials. The primary design that SOIL builds are called urine diversion, or dry toilets that separate the urine and the feces through the use of a specially designed toilet seat. The sterile urine is used directly as a fertilizer or diverted into soakaway pits. The feces is treated through a process of managed composting to ensure that all pathogens have been killed and the resulting compost is safe for agricultural use.
- EkoMobil. EkoMobil is a mobile toilet service that SOIL offers to construction sites, cultural events, and others in need of mobile sanitation. EkoMobil uses the same container-based ecological sanitation technology as EkoLakay.
- Compost. Waste collected from SOIL's ecological sanitation toilets, as well as the ecological sanitation toilets of other organizations in Haiti, are treated through a process of managed thermophilic composting at SOIL's composting waste treatment sites. The process exceeds standards set by the World Health Organization (WHO) for the safe treatment of human waste. SOIL tests all wastes in their laboratory before bagging and selling it under the brand name Konpòs Lakay. Since 2006, SOIL has produced over 250 metric tons of compost.
- EcoSan Education. In 2011, SOIL published The SOIL Guide to Ecological Sanitation. This document describes SOIL's five years of ecological sanitation experience in Haiti. It covers topics such as toilet designs, management strategies, composting techniques, and lessons learned. The SOIL Guide is available in English and Haitian Creole.

== Past Programs ==
- Permaculture. Starting in late 2013 SOIL began attending permaculture design courses at the 2013 International Permaculture Congress in Cuba. They designed two farms according to permaculture principles, the SOIL office, farm, and the KOMOP farm. KOMOP is a contraction of Komite = Committee and Opòtinite = Opportunity.
- Public Toilets. SOIL built the first ecological sanitation toilet in Haiti in 2006 and went on to build toilets around northern Haiti in partnership with many local community groups and international organizations.
- Emergency Sanitation. Following the 2010 Haiti earthquake, SOIL expanded to Port-au-Prince.

== See also ==
- Ecological sanitation
- Urine diversion
- Water supply and sanitation in Haiti
