= Container-based sanitation =

Sanitation system which uses removable containers

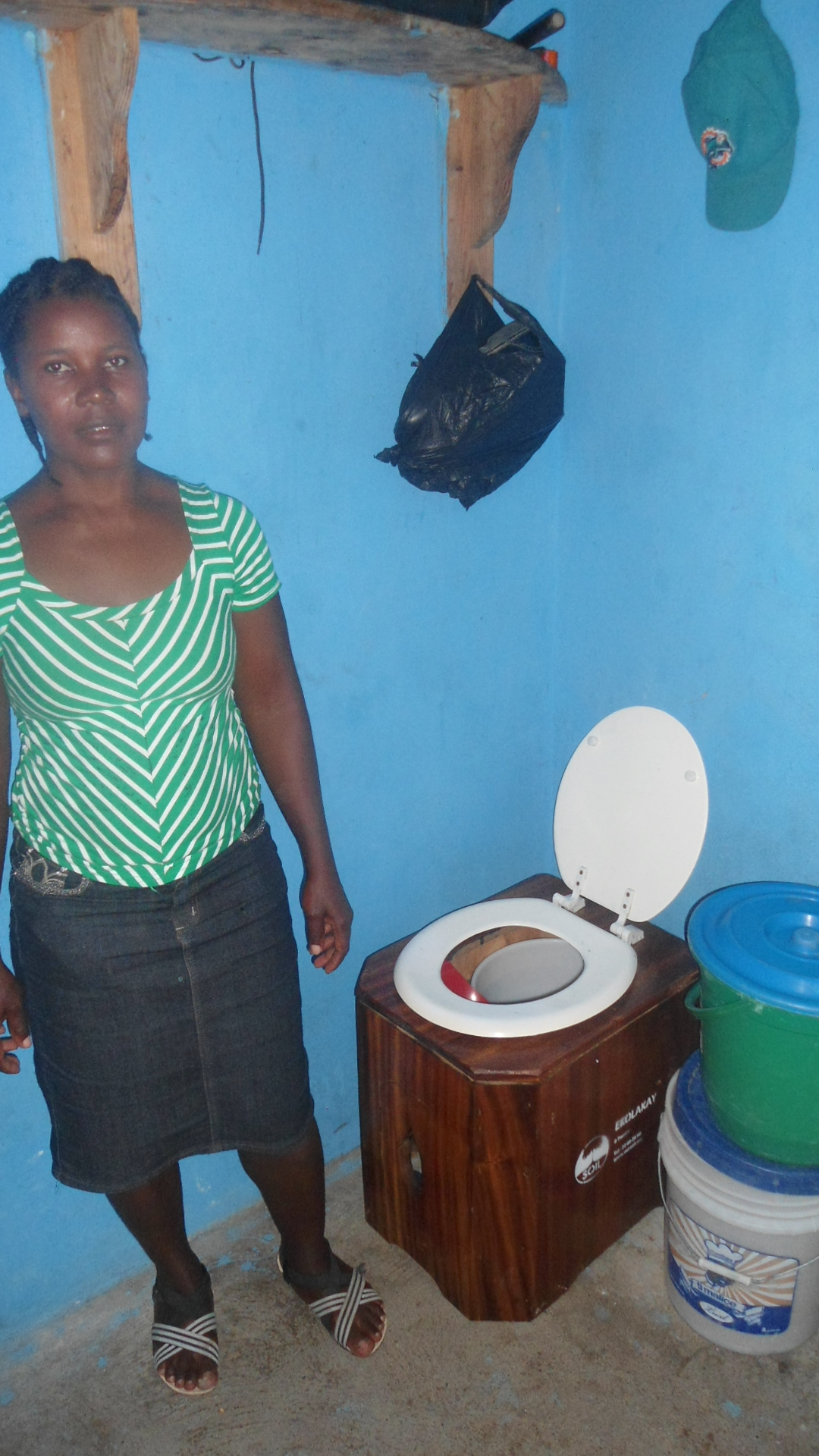
Example of a toilet used in a container-based sanitation system (urine-diverting dry toilet as marketed by the NGO SOIL in Haiti under the name of "EkoLakay")

Container-based sanitation (abbreviated as CBS) is the collection of human excreta in sealable, removable containers (also called cartridges) that are transported to waste treatment facilities. This type of sanitation involves a commercial service which provides certain types of portable toilets, and delivers empty containers when picking up full ones. The service transports and safely disposes of or reuses collected excreta. The cost of collection of excreta is usually borne by the users. With suitable development, support and functioning partnerships, CBS can be used to provide low-income urban populations with safe collection, transport and treatment of excrement at a lower cost than installing and maintaining sewers. In most cases, CBS is based on the use of urine-diverting dry toilets.

A key benefit of container-based sanitation systems is its relative low-cost. In addition, the process assures there is no human contact with excreta. Feces can be contained, carried, transported and emptied into treatment facilities without exposing humans to pathogens.

Since 2010, container-based sanitation has typically been used in low-income settings where it is not feasible or appropriate to use or construct sewerage systems. This includes densely populated urban neighborhoods, informal settlements, areas with high water tables, or where there is risk of frequent flooding.

Container-based sanitation systems are a low-cost sanitation solution. They can be used in rapidly growing urban areas, refugee camps and emergency sanitation situations. They are in line with the United Nations' Sustainable Development Goal 6 to "ensure sanitation for all by 2030". Container based sanitation is promoted since 2016 by the Container Based Sanitation Alliance.

== Background ==
Container-based sanitation systems can be used in rapidly growing urban areas. The pressure to achieve Sustainable Development Goal 6 – "to ensure availability and sustainable management of water and sanitation services for all" – is increasing.

Current operators of container-based sanitation systems have developed different approaches. As of 2017, several systems are being tested for scalability. With suitable development, support and effective partnerships, some believe that container-based sanitation can be scaled up to provide more low-income urban populations with safe sanitation. Costs for containment, collection, transport and treatment of excreta are expected to be lower than the cost of sewers and water treatment plants.

== Overview ==
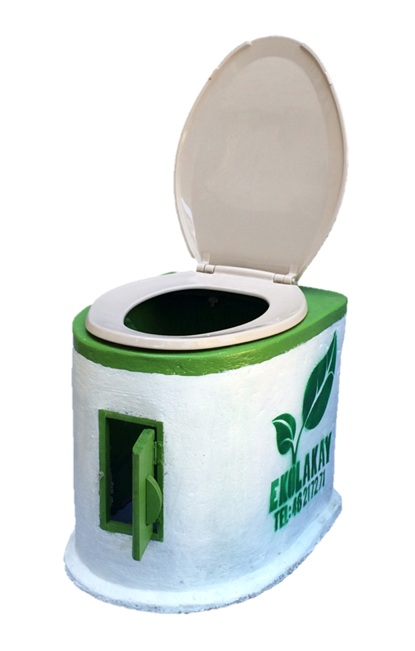
Example of a container-based toilet – "EkoLakay" by SOIL

A study by Worldbank published in 2019 states that CBS emerged as an alternative service approach for the urban poor in about 2009.

Container-based sanitation is usually provided as a commercial service, typically for a weekly or monthly fee for a 'household subscription', that provides toilets and regularly collects excreta. All infrastructure associated with a container-based sanitation system is typically situated above ground. Excreta-filled containers are sealed and transported by container-based sanitation service providers to a designated treatment or disposal site. Water usage is limited to the amount required for hand washing and anal cleansing.

Households do not have to build their own toilets (such as pit latrines) but can sign up for a service by the CBS service provider.

One of the main advantages of container-based sanitation is that it is a modular system. Each aspect of the system (from technology to business model) can be adapted to fit the context.

Like pay-per-use public toilets, household subscription container-based sanitation services enable customers to discontinue usage if they so choose. The advantage of low upfront cost is another similarity to public toilets. The capital required for installing some household toilets and sanitation systems can be prohibitive. Container-based sanitation toilets can be installed with very little upfront cost.

The underlying principles of a container-based system can appear superficially similar to models of excreta management, which also contain excreta in-situ. These might be bucket toilets or pan latrines. Excreta is carried in open containers which are likely to be emptied before proper treatment. In India, the term, manual scavenging refers to emptying pit latrines.

The key distinction is that while a container-based sanitation system can include manual collection of containers, the containers or cartridges are sealed and the excreta is treated. People do not come into contact with waste throughout the entire service chain of containment, emptying, transportation, treatment and disposal or reuse. Proponents also note that users have more freedom of choice in that container-based toilets are portable and customers could choose another service provider.

=== Service chain ===
==== The toilet ====
A container-based sanitation toilet typically requires no water and can often be moved quite easily. The removable container for excreta is routinely exchanged for an empty container when it is full. The toilet bowl often has a lid. Odor is eliminated by adding a dry cover material or using a biodegradable plastic film. The goal is to eliminate human contact with feces, reduce odor and avoid attracting insects.

In most cases, but not all, container-based sanitation systems require separation of urine and excrement. Therefore, a urine-diverting dry toilet is often used. These types of toilets are simple and minimize the volume of waste in the excreta container. Diverted urine is often drained into the soil if the water table is low enough. It can also be stored long enough for pathogen die-off via desiccation or biodegredation so it can be used as plant fertilizer. Solar exposure has been highly correlated with biosolids that meet EPA Class A pathogen reduction.

==== Container transport ====
Containers vary in size from 5 liters to 208 liters, depending on the particular system. After sealing, the containers are transported by service providers to centralized facilities where the waste is removed and processed. Containers are then disinfected before being delivered to a customer again.

==== Treatment, disposal and reuse ====
Waste processing can take many different forms, from simple pathogen reduction to full resource recovery techniques. Resource recovery from human waste collected by a container-based sanitation system is comparatively easier to convert into energy, animal feed or soil amendments. There is far less liquid to remove and treat since toilet waste has not been mixed with water from other household tasks.

Currently, the most common method of resource recovery is thermophilic composting. Others options are conversion to uncarbonized and carbonized biomass fuel, using black soldier fly larvae to produce protein-rich animal feed, and anaerobic digestion for biogas production.

== Applications ==
CBS systems may be applicably especially for poor urban populations in dense urban slums. Other applications can include areas where:

- Floods are possible or they are difficult to reach (such as hilly terrains or settlements above or very near to water courses).
- The ground conditions are not suitable for the installation of latrine pits, septic tanks, or sewers
- Landlords are not willing to invest in toilets;
- Water shortages make sewer-based solutions more challenging
- Refugee camps have been built

=== Humanitarian response ===
In 2017 at the Kakuma refugee camp in Kenya, the container-based sanitation system run by Sanivation was shown to be cheaper than pit latrines, given the costs associated with installation and frequent de-sludging. Due to quick installation, minimal permanent infrastructure and relatively low costs, container-based sanitation proved to be a system that was easily shipped to new areas and quickly scaled to match refugee, emergency sanitation or disaster response needs.

In response to the earthquake that struck Port-au-Prince Haiti in January 2010, the non-profit organization SOIL mounted the first large-scale humanitarian response using container-based sanitation. The organization constructed over 200 public toilets in 32 camps for internally displaced people throughout the city. Over their five-year humanitarian response program more than 20,000 people accessed these container-based sanitation toilets. Over 700 metric tons of waste was converted into compost and sold to the agricultural sector.

== Costs ==
Families pay significantly less for a household subscription (that includes a toilet) compared to the cost of constructing a latrine or pour flush toilet. For example, Ghana households of up to five users pay about 9 USD a month.

For the public sector, container-based sanitation systems offer a cost-effective option. Low infrastructure investment relative to sewer-based sanitation systems make systems attractive. Costs are also kept down because water and energy are not needed.

Although container-based sanitation systems have shown considerable potential for cost recovery through service fees and sales of final products, the need to continue experimenting and identifying the right elements for business models and public financing remain.

== Society and culture ==
=== Government approvals ===
Container-based sanitation has gained official recognition in Kenya as a safe and cost-effective alternative to sewers and on-site sanitation systems. However, many regions have yet to take any official stance on container-based sanitation. Some service providers are currently working together with local government partners to conduct World Health Organization Sanitation Safety Planning, which is a modular risk assessment process used to systematically understand and mitigate health-related hazards for each link of the sanitation chain.

The Container-Based Sanitation Alliance was formed in November 2016 to share information on "best practices" and collaborate on building industry standards of safety.

== Examples and types ==
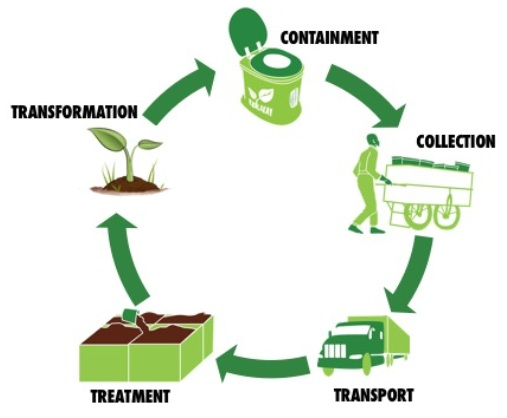
Schematic showing how container-based sanitation can achieve hygienic and productive recycling of feces

The basic concept of the container-based sanitation system is being applied by various organizations and businesses around the world, differentiated mainly by the types of toilet interface used, financing models, and reuse or disposal methods.

=== Social enterprises as service providers ===
==== Clean Team ====
Clean Team is a social enterprise providing safe, affordable in-home container-based sanitation toilets for low-income families in Kumasi, Ghana. It began operations in 2011 as a joint venture between Water and Sanitation for the Urban Poor (WSUP) and Unilever. Toilets are provided at no initial cost, with a weekly charge paid by customers for a "Swap & Go" service to collect full sealed containers and replace them with clean, empty containers. Clean Team transports the waste and ensures its safe disposal and treatment at a processing center owned by Kumasi Metropolitan Assembly.

==== Loowatt ====
Loowatt is an enterprise that develops safe, closed-loop container-based sanitation solutions. Loowatt toilets are waterless and linked to value-generating treatment systems. Loowatt works across global markets serving diverse users, including customers at events and festivals in the UK, and urban households in low-income markets. In 2017, Loowatt toilets were being tested in five countries.

==== Sanergy: Fresh Life Toilet ====
Sanergy is a social enterprise making safe sanitation accessible and affordable in Africa's urban informal settlements where there are no sewer connections. Sanergy's approach to solving the sanitation crisis involves five key steps: building a network of container-based sanitation franchises offering affordable "Fresh Life Toilets"; supporting its operating partners with access to finance, training, and marketing; collecting the waste regularly and safely removing it from the community; converting the waste into valuable end products, such as organic fertilizer, insect-based animal feed, and renewable energy; and selling the end products to Kenyan farms. As of October 2017, Sanergy serves 50,000 people daily through a network of 1,300 facilities in Nairobi.

==== Sanitation First: GroSan Toilet ====
Sanitation First, a UK and India based non-profit organization, has developed a container-based system suitable for use in India that does not contravene the country's strict manual scavenging laws. The toilet, which they call a "GroSan Toilet" has an interface based around that of a urine-diverting dry toilet. Within the toilet superstructures are two spaces: one for the toilet and another for anal cleansing with water. Underneath, containers separately receive the three types of excreta: feces, urine, and anal wash water. Once full, the containers are taken to a central treatment facility. The waste products are stored, treated and disposed of safely, generally as an agricultural compost. As of November 2017 some 5,000 people were daily using these kinds of toilets in the Union Territory of Puducherry and Cuddalore, in the Indian state of Tamil Nadu.

==== EcoLakay Toilets ====
The non-profit organization SOIL was established in Haiti in 2006, providing affordable household container-based sanitation services in some of the world's poorest communities. Feces collected in locally made, urine-diverting container EkoLakay toilets are transported to a composting facility, where they are safely transformed into agricultural-grade compost. This compost is then sold for agricultural application, improving both the fertility and water-holding capacity of local soils. Revenue from monthly user fees and compost sales are used to cover a part of the ongoing service costs.

==== Sanivation ====
Sanivation is a social enterprise based in Kenya that partners with institutions to turn feces into a sustainable fuel. Sanivation offers mobile or permanent models of their Bluebox toilet: a locally built, urine-diverting, dry container-based sanitation toilet. This waste is processed using their proprietary treatment technology, which harnesses solar-thermal energy to safely treat the waste and transform it into charcoal briquettes for sale, creating a financially sustainable and business model for sanitation services that can also be replicated.

==== Sanima ====
Sanima (previously called x-runner) is a women-led enterprise that works in Lima, Peru. Operations began in early 2012, piloting a dry-toilet and waste collection system, as well as a treatment process. Sanima provides customer households with a portable dry toilet from Separett. In less than an hour, a toilet is installed in a user's home and accumulated waste is collected on a weekly basis. The waste is then safely processed into compost by Sanima. Households pay a monthly fee for the toilet rental and collection service. In the past six years, Sanima has been providing safe sanitation to hundreds of households in Lima, Peru.

==== Mosan ====
Mosan is a Swiss social enterprise active in Guatemala providing circular sanitation systems, which include the Mosan Urine-Diverting Dry Toilet for in-home use. The toilet itself is mobile, contains two removable containers and a smell valve to avoid smell from urine. It is produced from PE plastics which make it easy to clean, long-lasting and aspirational for users. The Mosan services provides collection and transport of excreta and ensures safe transformation into fertilizers. The comprehensive systemic solution improves health conditions, protects the environment and water sources, while creating local business opportunities.

=== Packaging toilet ===
A packaging toilet is a dry toilet which seals all the excreta from one bowel movement into its own package. It does not use water. The smell of excreta is sealed away from other users of the toilet.

The design goes back to 1936, where it was used in Buckminster Fuller's Dymaxion house. That toilet used shrinkwrap plastic for packaging the waste. Other designs are currently marketed by various companies.

== See also ==
- Decentralized wastewater system
- Fecal sludge management
- Open defecation
- Self-supply of water and sanitation
- Sustainable Sanitation Alliance
