= Reed Odourless Earth Closet =

The Reed odourless earth closet (ROEC) is a variation on the ventilated improved pit (VIP) toilet where the pit is fully off-set from the Outhouse and is connected to the squatting plate by a curved chute.

The ROEC is fitted with a vent pipe to control odour and insect nuisance. It is claimed that the chute, in conjunction with the ventilation stack, encourages vigorous air circulation down the toilet, thereby removing odours and discouraging flies.

This type of latrine is common in southern Africa.

== Design consideration for ROEC ==
=== Design life ===
Most likely 4 to 15 years but the design life should be as long as possible: at least 10 years is desirable. The longer the design life, the longer the interval between relocating or emptying the latrine.

=== Dimensions ===
Usually the pit cross-sectional area should not be more than 2 m^{2} in order to avoid cover spans with large spans. In practice, a ROEC serving one household commonly has a diameter of 1–1.5 m or in case of square or rectangular pits, a width of 1–1.5 m.

=== Vent pipe ===
Vent pipe of a wide variety of materials are used, for example polyvinyl chloride (PVC), unplasticized PVC, bricks, etc. Whatever material is used, durability (including corrosion resistance), availability, cost and ease of construction are important factors. The vent pipe is sufficiently long such that the roof does not interfere with the action of wind across the top of the vent pipe. For both flat and sloped roofs, the top of the vent pipe should be at least 500 mm higher than highest point of the roof.

The internal diameter of the vent pipe depends on the required venting velocity necessary to achieve the recommended ventilation rate of at least 20 m^{3}/h. This in turn depends on factors like internal surface roughness of the pipe, its length (which determines the friction losses), the head loss through the flyscreen and wind direction.

=== Flyscreen specification ===
The purpose of the flyscreen is to prevent passage of flies and mosquitoes; therefore, the mesh is not larger than 1.2 mm × 1.5 mm. The flyscreen is made of corrosion-resistant material that is able to withstand intense rainfall, high temperature and strong sunlight. Stainless steel screens are preferred.

== Advantages ==
As the pit is offset from the squatting hole excreta will not be seen, thus convenient to the users.
