= Human waste =

Feces and urine

Human waste (or human excreta) refers to the waste products of the human digestive system, menses, and human metabolism including urine and feces. As part of a sanitation system that is in place, human waste is collected, transported, treated and disposed of or reused by one method or another, depending on the type of toilet being used, ability by the users to pay for services and other factors. Fecal sludge management is used to deal with fecal matter collected in on-site sanitation systems such as pit latrines and septic tanks.

The sanitation systems in place differ vastly around the world, with many people in developing countries having to resort to open defecation where human waste is deposited in the environment, for lack of other options. Improvements in "water, sanitation and hygiene" (WASH) around the world is a key public health issue within international development and is the focus of Sustainable Development Goal 6.

People in developed countries tend to use flush toilets where the human waste is mixed with water and transported to sewage treatment plants.

Children's excreta can be disposed of in diapers and mixed with municipal solid waste. Diapers are also sometimes dumped directly into the environment, leading to public health risks.

== Terminology ==
The term "human waste" is used in the general media to mean several things, such as sewage, sewage sludge, blackwater - in fact anything that may contain some human feces. In the stricter sense of the term, human waste is in fact human excreta, i.e. urine and feces, with or without water being mixed in. For example, dry toilets collect human waste without the addition of water.

== Health aspects ==
Human waste is considered a biowaste, as it is a vector for both viral and bacterial diseases. It can be a serious health hazard if it gets into sources of drinking water. The World Health Organization (WHO) reports that nearly 2.2 million people die annually from diseases caused by contaminated water, such as cholera or dysentery. A major accomplishment of human civilization has been the reduction of disease transmission via human waste through the practice of hygiene and sanitation, which can employ a variety of different technologies.

== Environmental aspects ==
Even high-mountains are not free from human waste. Each year, millions of mountaineers visit high-mountain areas. They generate tons of feces and urine annually which cause environmental pollution. Human feces pose a greater threat to the mountain environment than uncontrolled deposit of urine, due to the higher pathogen content of feces.

== Methods of processing ==
Methods of processing depend on the type of human waste:

- Sewage is treated via sewage treatment
- Sewage sludge is treated by sewage sludge treatment
- Fecal matter from dry toilets may undergo composting
- Fecal sludge from pit latrines is treated and managed with an approach called fecal sludge management

The amount of water mixed with human waste can be reduced by the use of waterless urinals and composting toilets and by recycling greywater. The most common method of human waste treatment in rural areas where municipal sewage systems are unavailable is the use of septic tank systems. In remote rural places without sewage or septic systems, small populations allow for the continued use of honey buckets and sewage lagoons (see anaerobic lagoon) without the threat of disease presented by places with denser populations. Bucket toilets are used by rural villages in Alaska where, due to permafrost, conventional waste treatment systems cannot be utilized.

== Uses ==
Human waste in the form of wastewater (sewage) is used to irrigate and fertilize fields in many parts of the developing world where fresh water is unavailable. There is great potential for wastewater agriculture to produce more food for consumers in urban areas, as long as there is sufficient education about the dangers of eating such food uncooked.

== See also ==
- Blackwater (waste)
- Ecological sanitation
- Excretion
- Human right to water and sanitation
- Improved sanitation
- Night soil
- Reuse of human excreta
- Sustainable sanitation
- Vermifilter toilet
- Workers' right to access the toilet
