= List of countries by access to improved sanitation facilities =

This is a list of countries by access to improved sanitation facilities, which includes access to toilets and safe drinking water.

== Methods ==
Figures used in this chart are based on data compiled and uploaded by the World Bank in May 2013 through their World Development Indicators initiative. The information was provided by the respective governments of the listed countries. As the compiled figures are not collected with the same methodology and with different levels of rigor, there are limitations in their reliability in forming comparisons.

Sanitation as defined by the World Health Organization:

"Sanitation generally refers to the provision of facilities and services for the safe disposal of human urine and feces. Inadequate sanitation is a major cause of disease world-wide and improving sanitation is known to have a significant beneficial impact on health both in households and across communities. The word 'sanitation' also refers to the maintenance of hygienic conditions, through services such as garbage collection and wastewater disposal.

The United Nations states that improved sanitation facilities "ensure hygienic separation of human excreta from human contact."

The Joint Monitoring Programme for Water Supply and Sanitation of WHO and UNICEF has defined improved sanitation as follows: flush toilet, connection to a piped sewer system, connection to a septic system, flush/pour-flush to a pit latrine, ventilated improved pit (VIP) latrine, pit latrine with slab, composting toilet and/or some special cases.

The World Bank states:

"Access to improved sanitation facilities refers to the percentage of the population with at least adequate access to excreta disposal facilities that can effectively prevent human, animal, and insect contact with excreta. Improved facilities range from simple but protected pit latrines to flush toilets with a sewerage connection. To be effective, facilities must be correctly constructed and properly maintained."

== Countries ==
The following table shows the percentage of people using at least basic sanitation services, based on World Bank data.

Country	2000	2005	2010	2015	2020
Afghanistan	22	27	35	43	50
Albania	89	92	95	98	99
Algeria	84	86	87	87	86
American Samoa	65	65	63	57	54
Andorra	100	100	100	100	100
Angola	28	35	41	47	52
Antigua and Barbuda	82	84	86	88	
Argentina	87	90	93	95	
Armenia	87	89	91	93	94
Aruba	98	98	98	98	
Australia	100	100	100	100	100
Austria	100	100	100	100	100
Azerbaijan	62	72	85	96	
Bahamas	88	90	93	95	
Bahrain	100	100	100	100	100
Bangladesh	24	31	39	47	54
Barbados	89	91	94	96	98
Belarus	92	93	95	98	98
Belgium	99	99	99	99	99
Belize	82	84	86	87	88
Benin	9	11	13	15	17
Bermuda	100	100	100	100	100
Bhutan	47	55	63	70	77
Bolivia	35	40	48	57	66
Bosnia and Herzegovina	95	95	95	95	
Botswana	52	59	67	75	80
Brazil	73	78	82	86	90
British Virgin Islands	97	97	97	97	
Bulgaria	86	86	86	86	86
Burkina Faso	11	14	17	20	22
Burundi	45	46	46	46	46
Cape Verde	40	50	61	70	79
Cambodia	10	23	38	53	69
Cameroon	38	39	41	43	45
Canada	100	100	100	99	99
Cayman Islands		84	84	84	
Central African Republic	21	20	18	16	14
Chad	10	10	10	11	12
Chile	92	95	97	99	100
China	57	66	76	84	92
Colombia	75	80	84	89	94
Comoros	29	33	34	36	
Congo	12	14	16	19	20
Costa Rica	94	95	96	97	98
Côte d'Ivoire	21	23	27	31	35
Croatia	96	96	96	96	97
Cuba	88	88	89	90	91
Curaçao	98	98	99	99	
Cyprus	100	100	100	99	99
Czech Republic	99	99	99	99	99
Denmark	100	100	100	100	100
Djibouti	47	48	55	61	67
Dominica	64	70	77	80	
Dominican Republic	77	80	82	85	87
DR Congo	24	22	20	17	15
Ecuador	69	74	80	86	92
Egypt	91	93	94	96	97
El Salvador	83	84	83	83	82
Equatorial Guinea	55	60	64	66	
Eritrea	8	10	11	12	
Estonia	100	100	99	99	99
Eswatini	48	52	56	61	64
Ethiopia	3	4	6	7	9
Fiji	80	83	89	96	99
Finland	99	99	99	99	99
France	99	99	99	99	99
French Polynesia	98	98	98	97	97
Gabon	34	39	44	49	50
Gambia	51	46	46	46	47
Georgia	91	89	88	87	86
Germany	99	99	99	99	99
Ghana	7	11	15	19	24
Gibraltar	100	100	100	100	100
Greece	98	98	99	99	99
Greenland	100	100	100	100	100
Grenada	90	91	92	91	
Guam	89	89	90	90	
Guatemala	62	64	65	67	68
Guinea	9	13	18	24	30
Guinea-Bissau	5	8	11	14	18
Guyana	79	81	83	85	86
Haiti	17	22	27	33	37
Honduras	63	69	74	79	84
Hong Kong	97	97	97	97	97
Hungary	98	98	98	98	98
Iceland	99	99	99	99	99
India	14	28	43	58	73
Indonesia	38	49	61	74	86
Iran	78	82	85	88	90
Iraq	70	74	83	93	100
Ireland	100	100	100	100	100
Israel	100	100	100	100	100
Italy	100	100	100	100	100
Jamaica	83	84	85	86	87
Japan	100	100	100	100	100
Jordan	99	98	98	97	97
Kazakhstan	97	97	97	98	98
Kenya	31	31	32	32	33
Kiribati	32	37	41	43	46
Kuwait	100	100	100	100	100
Kyrgyzstan	92	93	95	97	98
Laos	28	43	56	70	79
Latvia	88	89	90	92	92
Lebanon	77	81	87	94	99
Lesotho	8	20	30	41	50
Liberia	13	15	16	17	18
Libya	90	91	91	92	92
Liechtenstein	100	100	100	100	100
Lithuania	95	98	98	100	100
Luxembourg	98	98	98	98	98
Macau	100	100	100	100	100
Madagascar	4	6	8	10	12
Malawi	21	22	24	25	27
Malaysia	97	98	99	100	
Maldives	75	82	88	94	99
Mali	16	22	29	37	45
Malta	100	100	100	100	100
Marshall Islands		80	82	83	84
Mauritania	17	23	32	43	50
Mauritius	90	92	94	96	
Mexico	77	81	85	89	92
Micronesia	25	46	67	88	
Moldova	74	75	75	76	79
Monaco	100	100	100	100	100
Mongolia	45	50	56	62	68
Montenegro			93	96	98
Morocco	68	73	78	83	87
Mozambique	9	15	22	29	37
Myanmar	63	66	69	71	74
Namibia	28	30	32	34	35
Nauru	66	66	66	66	
Nepal	14	27	42	59	77
Netherlands	98	98	98	98	98
New Caledonia	100	100	100	100	100
New Zealand	100	100	100	100	100
Nicaragua	57	62	67	72	73
Niger	5	8	10	13	15
Nigeria	29	31	34	38	43
North Korea		75	78	82	85
North Macedonia	89	89	92	95	98
Northern Mariana Islands	75	76	77	78	79
Norway	98	98	98	98	98
Oman	89	92	96	99	99
Pakistan	31	40	50	58	67
Palau	91	94	97	99	100
Panama	62	67	73	79	85
Papua New Guinea	18	18	19	19	19
Paraguay	70	77	82	88	93
Peru	63	68	71	75	79
Philippines	61	63	69	75	82
Poland	89	92	95	99	94
Portugal	97	98	99	99	100
Puerto Rico	98	99	99	100	100
Qatar	100	100	100	100	100
Romania		75	79	83	87
Russia	84	86	87	88	89
Rwanda	45	52	58	64	69
Samoa	94	95	95	96	97
San Marino	100	100	100	100	100
São Tomé and Príncipe	20	27	34	41	48
Saudi Arabia	98	99	99	100	100
Senegal	37	42	47	52	57
Serbia	95	96	97	97	98
Seychelles	94	96	98	100	100
Sierra Leone	10	12	13	15	17
Singapore	100	100	100	100	100
Sint Maarten	98	99	99	99	
Slovakia	100	99	98	98	98
Slovenia	98	98	98	98	98
Small states	61	63	68	71	72
Solomon Islands	20	22	27	32	35
Somalia	20	24	29	34	39
South Africa	59	64	69	74	78
South Korea	100	100	100	100	100
South Sudan				11	16
Spain	100	100	100	100	100
Sri Lanka	77	81	86	91	100
St. Kitts and Nevis	86	90	93	95	
St. Lucia	85	85	84	83	83
Saint Martin	99	99	99	100	100
St. Vincent and the Grenadines	71	77	83	87	
Sudan	21	22	28	35	37
Suriname	78	80	83	86	90
Sweden	99	99	99	99	99
Switzerland	100	100	100	100	100
Syria	90	91	91	90	90
Tajikistan	90	92	93	95	97
Tanzania	5	12	19	26	32
Thailand	92	94	95	97	99
Timor-Leste		40	46	51	57
Togo	10	11	13	16	19
Tonga	89	90	93	93	93
Trinidad and Tobago	90	91	93	94	94
Tunisia	77	82	87	92	97
Turkey	87	90	93	96	99
Turkmenistan	93	94	95	97	99
Turks and Caicos Islands	81	83	86	88	
Tuvalu		80	83	84	
Uganda	17	18	18	19	20
Ukraine	94	95	96	97	98
United Arab Emirates		97	98	99	99
United Kingdom	99	99	99	99	99
United States	100	100	100	100	100
Uruguay	93	94	95	97	98
Uzbekistan	93	96	99	100	100
Vanuatu	56	56	55	53	53
Venezuela		93	94	95	96
Vietnam	52	62	71	81	89
U.S. Virgin Islands	99	99	99	99	99
West Bank and Gaza	90	91	94	96	99
Yemen	45	48	50	52	54
Zambia	22	25	27	30	32
Zimbabwe	45	44	41	38	35

== See also ==
- List of countries by access to clean water
- List of countries by Human Development Index
- List of responsibilities in the water supply and sanitation sector in Latin America and the Caribbean
- Water supply and sanitation in Sub-Saharan Africa
- Workers' right to access the toilet
