= Sustainable Development Goal 6 =

Global goal to achieve clean water and sanitation for all people by 2030

- Mission statement: "Ensure availability and sustainable management of water and sanitation for all"
- Commercial?: No
- Type of project: Nonprofit
- Location: International
- Founder: United Nations
- Established: 2015
- Website: sdgs.un.org

Sustainable Development Goal 6 (SDG 6 or Global Goal 6) declares the importance of achieving "clean water and sanitation for all". It is one of the 17 Sustainable Development Goals established by the United Nations General Assembly to succeed the former Millennium Development Goals (MDGs). According to the United Nations, the overall goal is to: "Ensure availability and sustainable management of water and sanitation for all." The goal has eight targets to be achieved by 2030 covering the main areas of water supply and sanitation and sustainable water resource management. Progress toward the targets will be measured by using eleven indicators.

The six key outcome targets to be achieved by 2030 include:

1. Achieve universal and equitable access to safe and affordable drinking water for all;
2. Achieve access to adequate and equitable sanitation and hygiene for all and end open defecation, paying special attention to the needs of women and girls and those in vulnerable situations;
3. Improve water quality, by reducing pollution, eliminating dumping and minimizing release of hazardous chemicals and materials, halving the proportion of untreated wastewater (wastewater treatment) and substantially increasing recycling and safe reuse globally;
4. Substantially increase water-use efficiency across all sectors and ensure sustainable withdrawals and supply of fresh water to address water scarcity and substantially reduce the number of people suffering from water scarcity;
5. Implement integrated water resources management (IWRM), at all levels, including through transboundary cooperation as appropriate;
6. Protect and restore water-related ecosystems, including mountains, forests, wetlands, rivers, aquifers and lakes.

The two means of implementing targets are to expand international cooperation and capacity-building support to developing countries, and to support local engagement in sustainable and participatory water and sanitation management.

Despite Official development assistance (ODA) disbursements to the water sector increasing to $9 billion in 2018. the Joint Monitoring Programme (JMP) of WHO and UNICEF reported in 2017 that 4.5 billion people still did not have safely managed sanitation. In 2017 only 71 per cent of the global population used safely managed drinking water, and 2.2 billion persons were still without safely managed drinking water. Other water-related hazards related to flooding and drought also remain significant threats to human development and wellbeing.

Like the others, this Sustainable Development Goal is closely interwoven with the other SDGs. For example, access to clean water will improve health and wellbeing, leading to a progress in SDG3; and, better health leads to a higher school attendance, progressing SDG 4, improving quality education. Achieving SDG6 can only happen if other SDGs are also achieved.

== Background ==
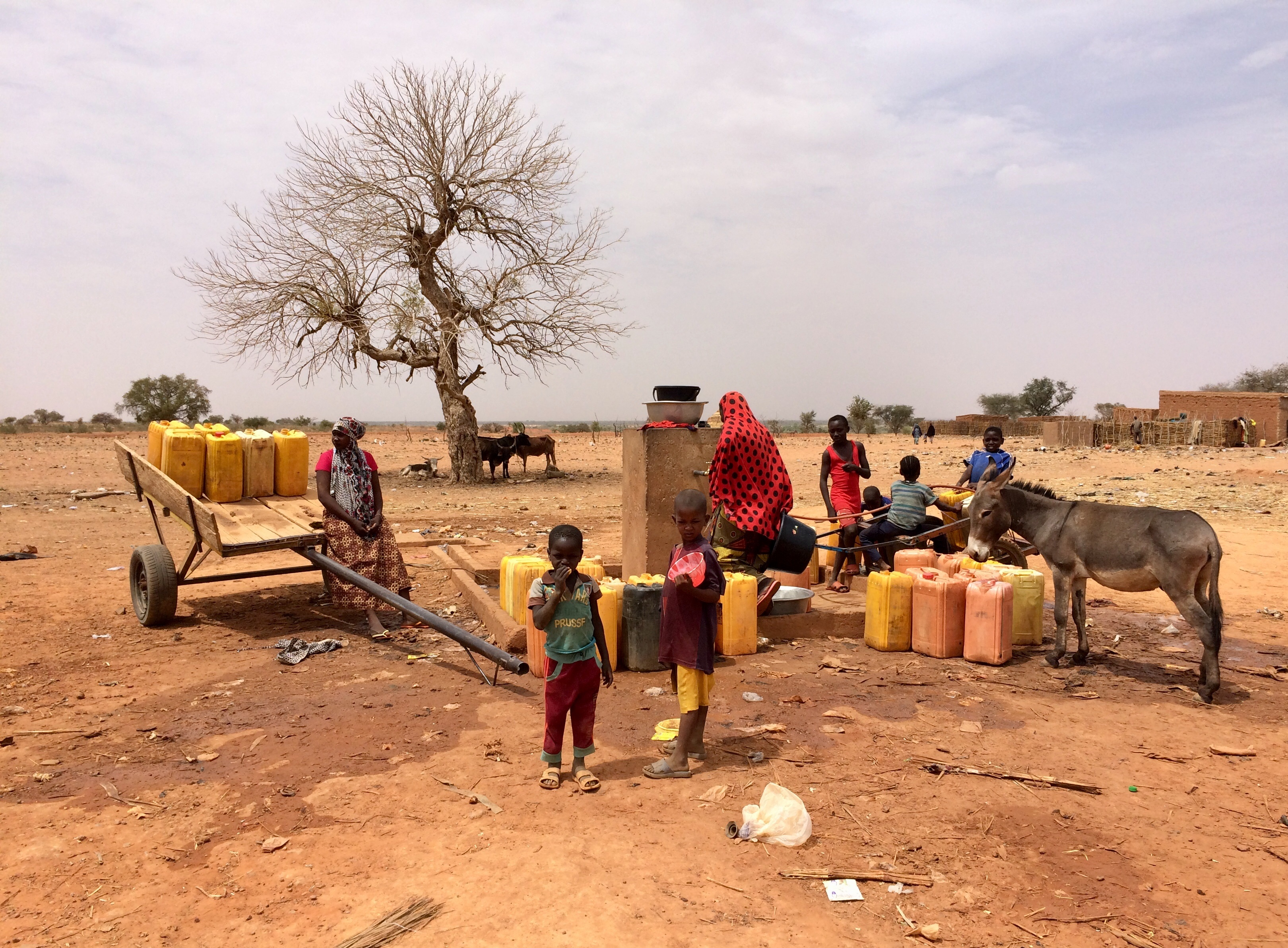
Families collecting water from a water well in Niger

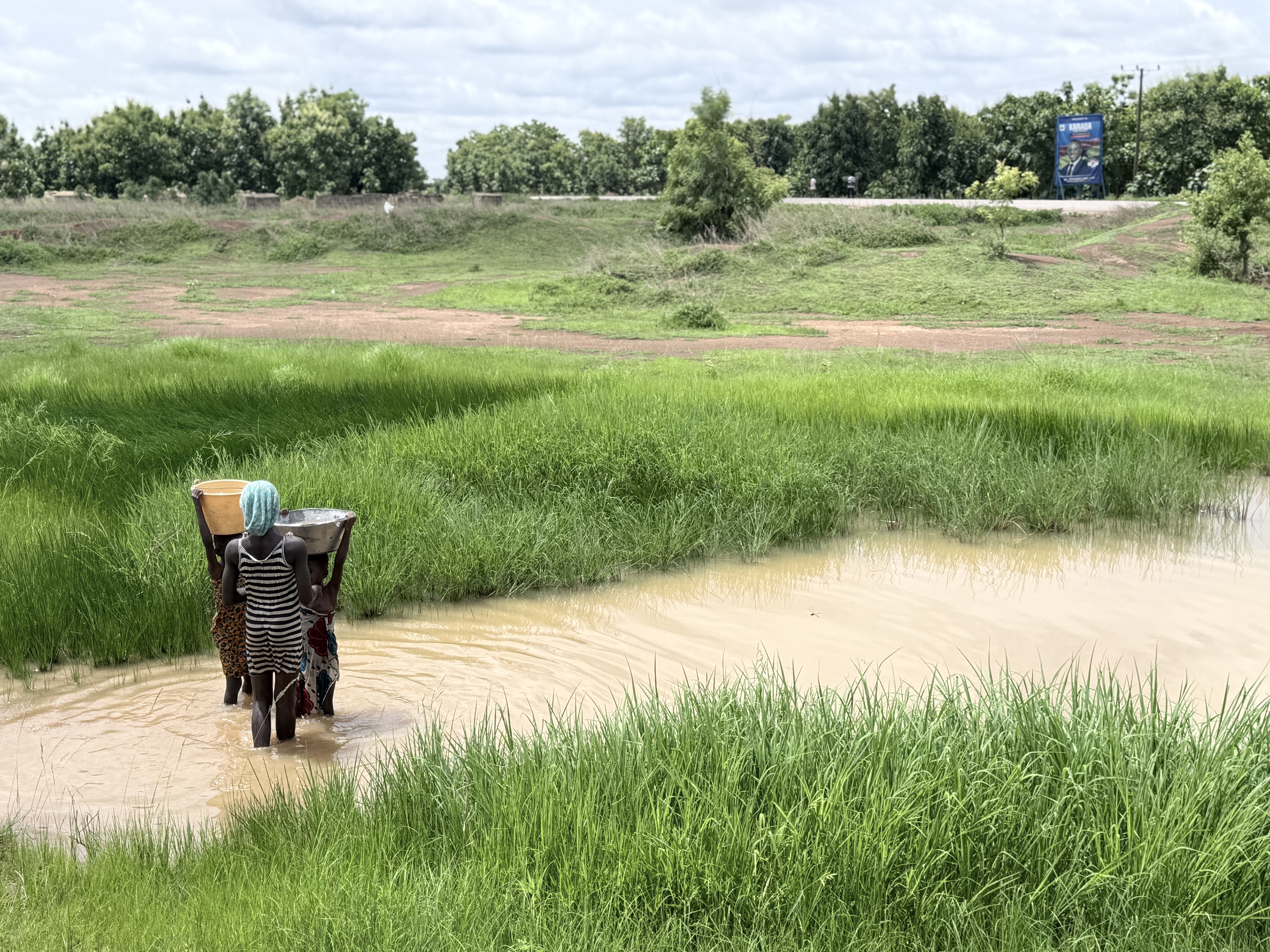
Children fetching muddy water from a pond in Karaga, Ghana.jpg

The United Nations (UN) has determined that access to clean water and sanitation facilities is a fundamental human right. However, only a few countries have written the human right to water into enforceable legislation creating serious problems for people wishing to use legal means to promote better access. Even in those countries, such as South Africa, with a clear constitutional commitment to the human right to water and sanitation it has proven difficult to obtain legal redress.

A review of the progress by the UN in 2020 found that "increasing donor commitments to the water sector will remain crucial to make progress towards Goal 6".

In 2022, the OECD estimated that to achieve SDG 6, current global spending on water needs approximately $1 trillion per year.

== Targets, indicators and progress ==
World map for Indicator 6.1.1 in 2022: Proportion of population using safely managed drinking water services

World map for Indicator 6.2.1a in 2022: Share of population using safely managed sanitation facilities

World map for Indicator 6.2.1b in 2022: "Share of the population with basic handwashing facilities on premises"

SDG 6 has eight targets including two so-called "implementing targets". Six of them are to be achieved by the year 2030, one by the year 2020, and one has no target year. Each of the targets also has one or two indicators which will be used to measure progress. In total there are 11 indicators to monitor progress for SDG6. The main data sources for the SDG 6 targets and indicators come from the Integrated Monitoring Initiative for SDG 6 coordinated by UN-Water.

The six "outcome-oriented targets" include: Safe and affordable drinking water; end open defecation and provide access to sanitation, and hygiene, improve water quality, wastewater treatment and safe reuse, increase water-use efficiency and ensure fresh water supplies, implement IWRM, protect and restore water-related ecosystems. The two "means of achieving" targets are to expand water and sanitation support to developing countries, and to support local engagement in water and sanitation management.

The first three targets relate to drinking water supply, sanitation services, and wastewater treatment and reuse.

An SDG 6 Baseline Report in 2018 found that "less than 50 percent of countries have comparable baseline estimates for most SDG 6 global indicators".

=== Target 6.1: Safe and affordable drinking water ===
The full title of Target 6.1 is: "By 2030, achieve universal and equitable access to safe and affordable drinking water for all".

This target has one indicator: Indicator 6.1.1 is the "Proportion of population using safely managed drinking water services".

The definition of "safely managed drinking water service" is: "Drinking water from an improved water source that is located on premises, available when needed and free from fecal and priority chemical contamination."

=== Target 6.2: End open defecation and provide access to sanitation and hygiene ===
The full title of Target 6.2 is: "By 2030, achieve access to adequate and equitable sanitation and hygiene for all and end open defecation, paying special attention to the needs of women and girls and those in vulnerable situations."

Attending school and work without disruption supports education and employment. Therefore, toilets at school and the workplace are included in the second target ("achieve access to adequate and equitable sanitation and hygiene for all").

Equitable sanitation and hygiene solutions address the needs of women and girls and those in vulnerable situations, such as the elderly or people with disabilities.

This target has one indicator: Indicator 6.2.1 is the "Proportion of population using (a) safely managed sanitation services and (b) a hand-washing facility with soap and water".

The definition of "safely managed sanitation" service is: "Use of improved facilities that are not shared with other households and where excreta are safely disposed of in situ or transported and treated offsite." Improved sanitation facilities are those designed to hygienically separate excreta from human contact.

Ending open defecation will require the provision of toilets and sanitation for 2.6 billion people as well as behavior change of the population. To meet SDG targets for sanitation by 2030, nearly "a third of countries will need to accelerate progress to end open defecation, including Brazil, China, Ethiopia, India, Indonesia, Nigeria, and Pakistan". This will require cooperation between governments, civil society and the private sector.

==== Report from 2019 for Target 6.1 and 6.2 ====
Targets 6.1 and 6.2 are usually reported on together because they are both part of the WASH sector and have the same custodian agency, the Joint Monitoring Program for Water Supply and Sanitation (JMP).

In June 2019, the JMP released their 138-page report "Progress on household drinking water, sanitation, and hygiene 2000-2017: special focus on inequalities."

===== Drinking water (Target 6.1) =====
The report said that in 2017, 5.3 billion people—representing 71% of the population of the world—used a "safely managed drinking-water service—one that is "located on premises, available when needed, and free from contamination".

By 2017, 6.8 billion people—representing 90% of the world's population—used "at least a basic service", which included "an improved drinking-water source within a round trip of 30 minutes to collect water". However, in 2017, there were still 785 million people who lacked "even a basic drinking-water service, including 144 million people who [were] dependent on surface water."

The report said that approximately 2 billion people used a "drinking water source contaminated with feces". The report warned that diseases, including "diarrhoea, cholera dysentery, typhoid, and polio" are transmitted by contaminated water, which cause about 485, 000 diarrhea deaths each year. It cautioned that 50% of the global population will be "living in water-stressed areas" by 2025.

By 2017, eighty countries provided access to clean water for more than 99% of their population. From 2000 to 2017, the global population that lacked access to clean water decreased from nearly 20% to roughly 10%.

===== Sanitation and hygiene (Target 6.2) =====
As of 2017, 22% of health care facilities in the least developed countries had no water service, with similar numbers lacking sanitation and waste management services(people who help in reducing waste in landfill).

The statistic in the 2017 baseline estimate by the JMP is that 4.5 billion people currently do not have safely managed sanitation.

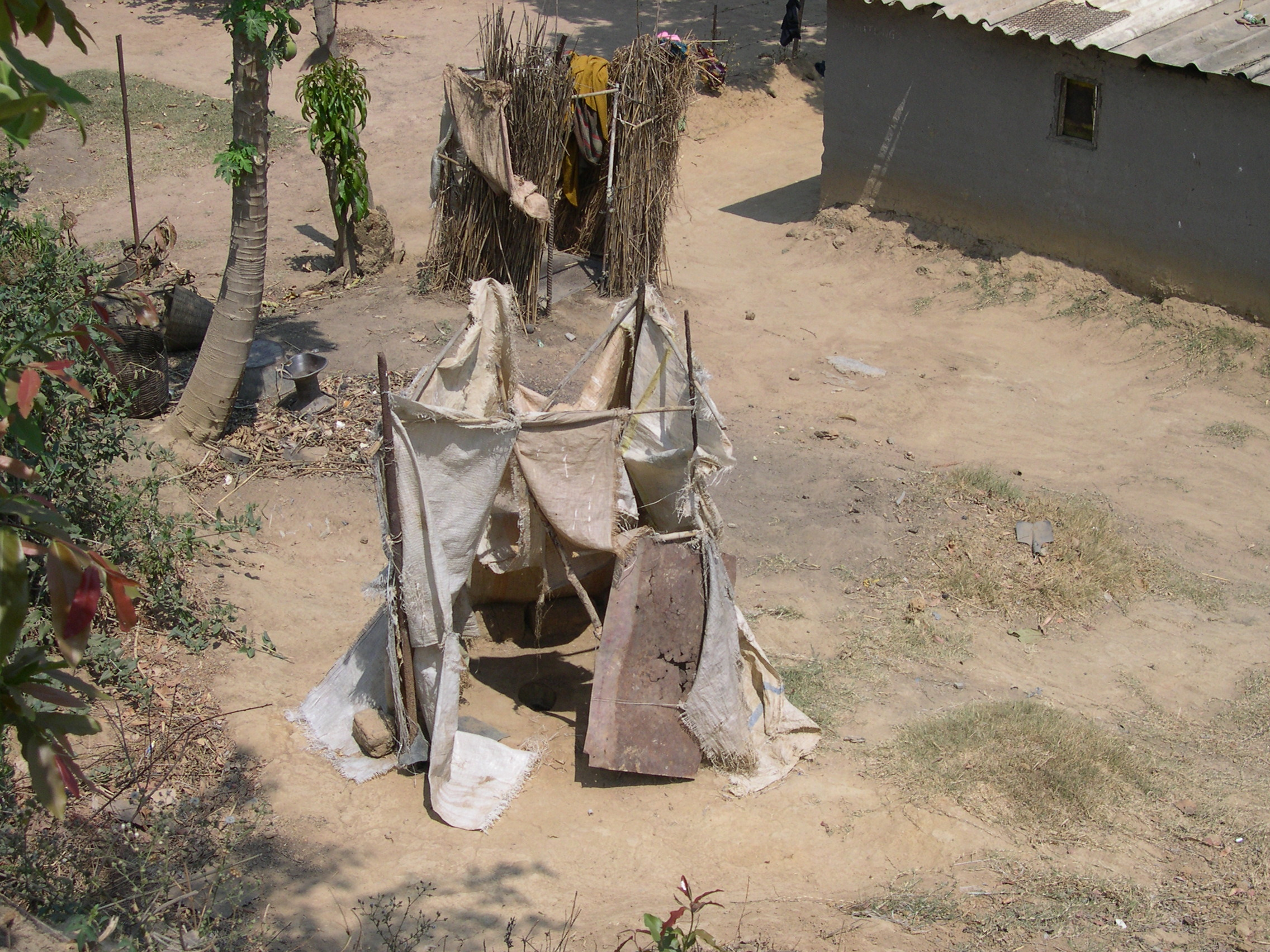
Unimproved sanitation example: pit latrine without slab in Lusaka, Zambia

Globally, the proportion of the population using safely managed sanitation services increased from 28 percent in 2000 to 45 percent in 2017. Latin America and the Caribbean, sub-Saharan Africa, and East and Southeast Asia recorded the largest increase. In total, there are still 701 million people around the world who still had to practice open defecation in 2017. This number had reduced in 2020 to 673 million persons who practised open defecation.

=== Target 6.3: Improve water quality, wastewater treatment, and safe reuse ===
Target 6.3 is formulated as "By 2030, improve water quality by reducing pollution, eliminating dumping and minimizing release of hazardous chemicals and materials, halving the proportion of untreated wastewater and substantially increasing recycling and safe reuse globally". This is also a sanitation-related target, as wastewater treatment is part of sanitation.

The target has two indicators:

- Indicator 6.3.1: Proportion of domestic (household use) and industrial wastewater flows safely treated
- Indicator 6.3.2: Proportion of bodies of water with good ambient water quality

The current status for Indicator 6.3.2 is that: "Preliminary estimates from 79 mostly high- and higher-middle income countries in 2019 suggest that, in about one quarter of the countries, less than half of all household wastewater flows were treated safely."

Preserving natural sources of water is very important to achieve universal access to safe and affordabledrinking water.

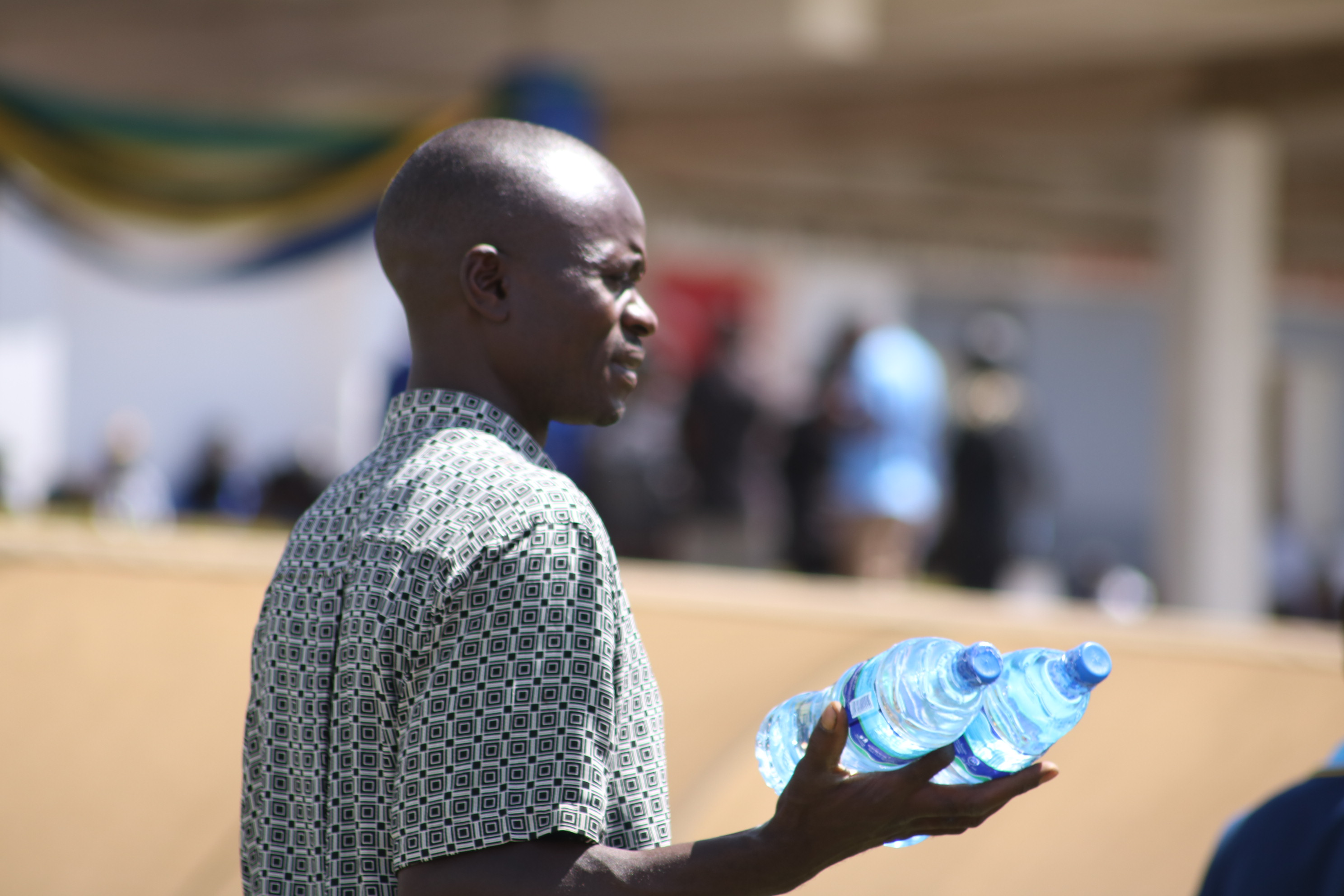
A man selling drinking water

=== Target 6.4: Increase water-use efficiency and ensure fresh water supplies ===
Target 6.4 is formulated as "By 2030, substantially increase water-use efficiency across all sectors and ensure sustainable withdrawals and supply of fresh water to address water scarcity and substantially reduce the number of people suffering from water scarcity."

This target has two indicators:

- Indicator 6.4.1: Change in water-use efficiency over time
- Indicator 6.4.2: Level of water stress: fresh water withdrawal as a proportion of available fresh water resources

Water Stress Indicator:

 WaterStress(%)=(TFWWTRWR−EFR)

Where:

TFWW = Total fresh water withdrawn, where year to which it refers will be provided

TRWR = Total renewable fresh water resources

EFR = Environmental flows requirements

The current situation regarding water stress was summarized as follows: "In 2017, Central and Southern Asia and Northern Africa registered very high water stress – defined as the ratio of fresh water withdrawn to total renewable fresh water resources – of more than 70 percent". This is followed by Western Asia and Eastern Asia, with high water stress of 54 percent and 46 percent, respectively.

=== Target 6.5: Implement IWRM ===
Target 6.5 is formulated as: "By 2030, implement integrated water resources management at all levels, including through transboundary cooperation as appropriate."

The two indicators include:

- Indicator 6.5.1 Degree of integrated water resources management
- Indicator 6.5.2 Proportion of transboundary basin area with an operational arrangement for water cooperation

A review in 2020 stated that: "In 2018, 60 percent of 172 countries reported very low, low and medium-low levels of implementation of integrated water resources management and were unlikely to meet the implementation target by 2030."

=== Target 6.6: Protect and restore water-related ecosystems ===
Target 6.6 is: "By 2020, protect and restore water-related ecosystems, including mountains, forests, wetlands, rivers, aquifers and lakes."

It has one indicator: Indicator 6.6.1 is the "Change in the extent of water-related ecosystems over time". This indicator monitoring methodology is framed around five sub-indicators:

1. spatial extent of water-related ecosystems (from satellite data)
2. water quality of lakes and artificial water bodies (from satellite data)
3. quantity of water (discharge) in rivers and estuaries (in situ data)
4. water quality imported from SDG Indicator 6.3.2 (in situ data)
5. quantity of groundwater within aquifers (in situ data)

=== Target 6.a: Expand water and sanitation support to developing countries ===
Target 6.a is: "By 2030, expand international cooperation and capacity-building support to developing countries in water- and sanitation-related activities and programmes, including water harvesting, desalination, water efficiency, wastewater treatment, recycling and reuse technologies."

It has one indicator: Indicator 6.a.1 is the "Amount of water- and sanitation-related official development assistance that is part of a government-coordinated spending plan".

In April 2020 the UN progress report stated that "ODA disbursements to the water sector increased to $9 billion, or 6 per cent, in 2018, following a decrease in such disbursements in 2017".

Not only ODA for water and sanitation infrastructure but also ODA for health education can promote greater use of safe water and sanitation facilities.

Developing countries with higher levels of military spending may have a greater need for water and sanitation assistance due to the diversion of public funds away from infrastructure. Evidence suggests that these countries receive larger amounts of ODA for water and sanitation, arguably to compensate for the underinvestment resulting from their prioritization of military spending over essential social services.

=== Target 6.b: Support local engagement in water and sanitation management ===
Target 6.b is: "Support and strengthen the participation of local communities in improving water and sanitation management."

It has one indicator: Indicator 6.b.1 is the "Proportion of local administrative units with established and operational policies and procedures for participation of local communities in water and sanitation management".

== Custodian agencies ==
Custodian agencies are in charge of reporting on the following indicators:

- Indicator 6.1.1 and 6.2.1: Joint Monitoring Programme for Water Supply and Sanitation (JMP). The JMP is a joint program of UNICEF and WHO and compiles data to monitor the progress of Target 6.1 and Target 6.2.
- Indicator 6.3.1: UN-Habitat and WHO
- Indicator 6.3.2: Global Environment Monitoring System for Fresh water (GEMS/Water), International Centre for Water Resources and Global Change (UNESCO-IHP); Federal Institute of Hydrology, Germany; University College Cork, Ireland
- Indicators 6.4.1 and 6.4.2: FAOSTAT - AQUASTAT
- Indicator 6.5.1: United Nations Environment Programme-DHI Centre
- Indicator 6.5.2: UNECE and UNESCO-IHP
- Indicator 6.6.1: United Nations Environment Programme, World Conservation Monitoring Centre, International Water Management Institute (IWMI)
- Indicators 6.a.1 and 6.b.1: UN-Water Global Analysis and Assessment of Sanitation and Drinking-Water (GLAAS)

== Challenges ==
=== Climate change ===
Climate change makes it harder to achieve SDG 6 Target 1 (universal access to safe drinking water). This is because climate change can increase weather-related shocks, namely droughts, heavy rain and temperature extremes. This, in turn can cause damage to water infrastructure and water scarcity(the gap between limited resources and unlimited wants).

=== Impact of COVID-19 pandemic ===
The COVID-19 pandemic significantly affected the ability of water utilities to meet SDG 6 by increasing losses on revenues that would otherwise be used to make investments.

The COVID-19 pandemic has also greatly affected the urban poor living in the slums with little or no access to clean water. The pandemic has shown the importance of sanitation, hygiene and adequate access to clean water to prevent diseases. According to the World Health Organization, handwashing is one of the most effective actions one can take to reduce the spread of pathogens and prevent infections, including the COVID-19 virus.

== Monitoring progress ==
Implementation of the SDGs implies continuous monitoring and periodic evaluation to check whether the direction and pace of development are right. High-level progress reports for all the SDGs are published in the form of reports by the United Nations Secretary General. Additionally, updates and progress can also be found on the SDG website which is managed by the United Nations.

In April 2020, United Nations Secretary-General António Guterres said: "Today, Sustainable Development Goal 6 is badly off track" and it "is hindering progress on the 2030 Agenda, the realization of human rights and the achievement of peace and security around the world".

Academics and practitioners continue to debate exactly how best to assess progress towards SDG6, with some continuing to champion resource-based approaches whilst others prefer to emphasise experience-based metrics. Experience-based metrics such as the "Household Water Insecurity Experiences" (HWISE) scale have proven a useful complement to resource-based approaches for assessing SDG progress, applied research of water insecurity dynamics, and monitoring and evaluation of development programmes.

== Links with other SDGs ==
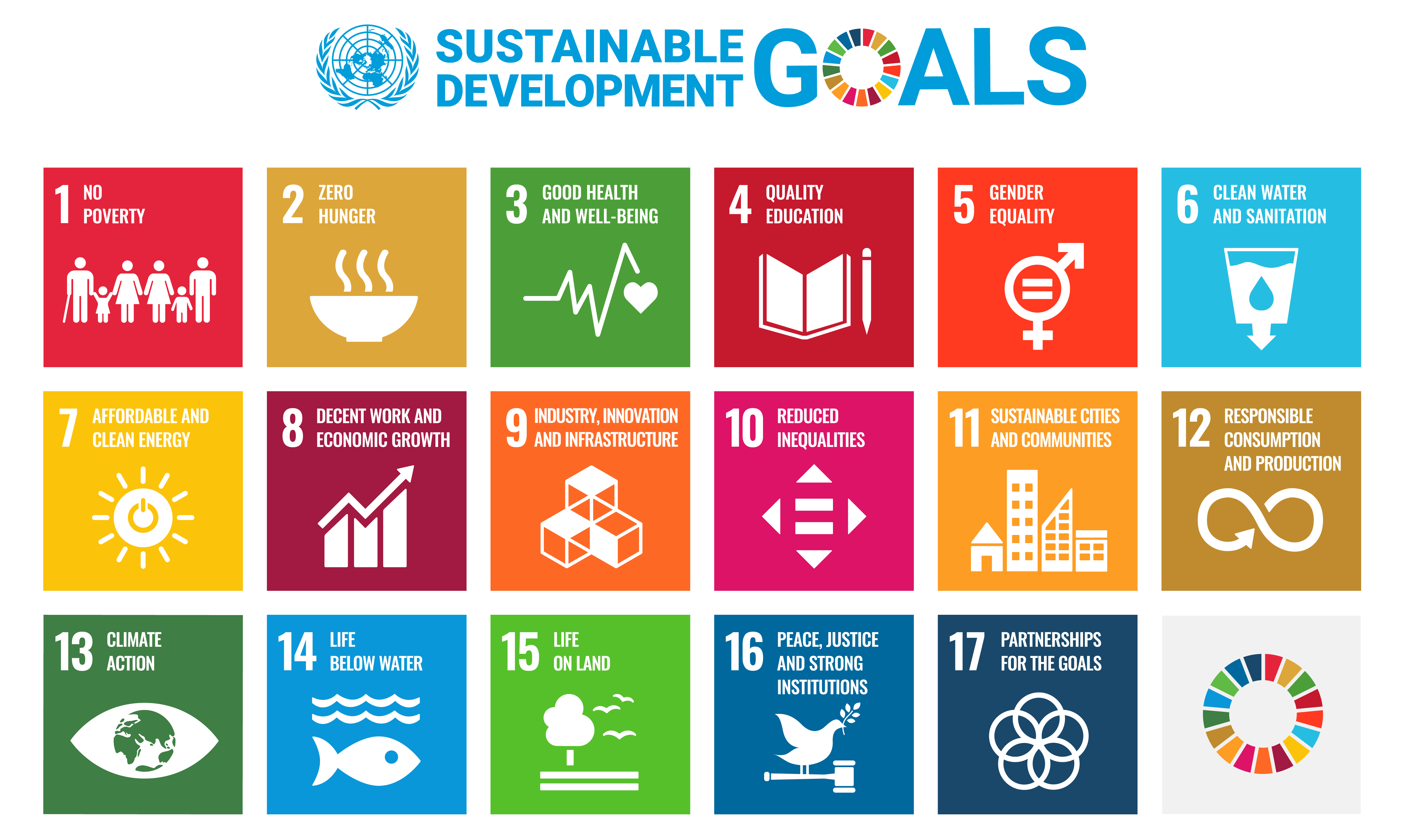
Sustainable Development Goals

The SDGs are highly interdependent. Therefore, the provision of clean water and sanitation for all is a precursor to achieving many of the other SDGs(Sustainable Development Goals). WASH experts have stated that without progress on Goal 6, the other goals and targets cannot be achieved.

For example, sanitation improvements can lead to more jobs (SDG 8) which would also lead to economic growth. SDG 6 progress improves health (SDG 3) and social justice (SDG 16). Recovering the resources embedded in excreta and wastewater (like nutrients, water, and energy) contributes to achieving SDG 12 (sustainable consumption and production) and SDG 2 (end hunger). Ensuring adequate sanitation and wastewater management along the entire value chain in cities contributes to SDG 11 (sustainable cities and communities) and SDG 1 (no poverty).

Sanitation systems with a resource recovery and reuse focus are getting increased attention. They can contribute to achieving at least fourteen of the SDGs, especially in an urban context.

== Organizations ==
The Sustainable Sanitation Alliance (SuSanA) has made it its mission to help achieve Targets 6.2 and 6.3. Global organizations such as Oxfam, UNICEF, WaterAid and many small NGOs as well as universities, research centers, private enterprises, government-owned entities etc. are all part of SuSanA and are dedicated to achieving SDG 6.

== See also ==
- Human right to water and sanitation
- Water security
- Water scarcity
- World Water Day
