= Improved sanitation =

Term used to categorize types or levels of sanitation for monitoring purposes

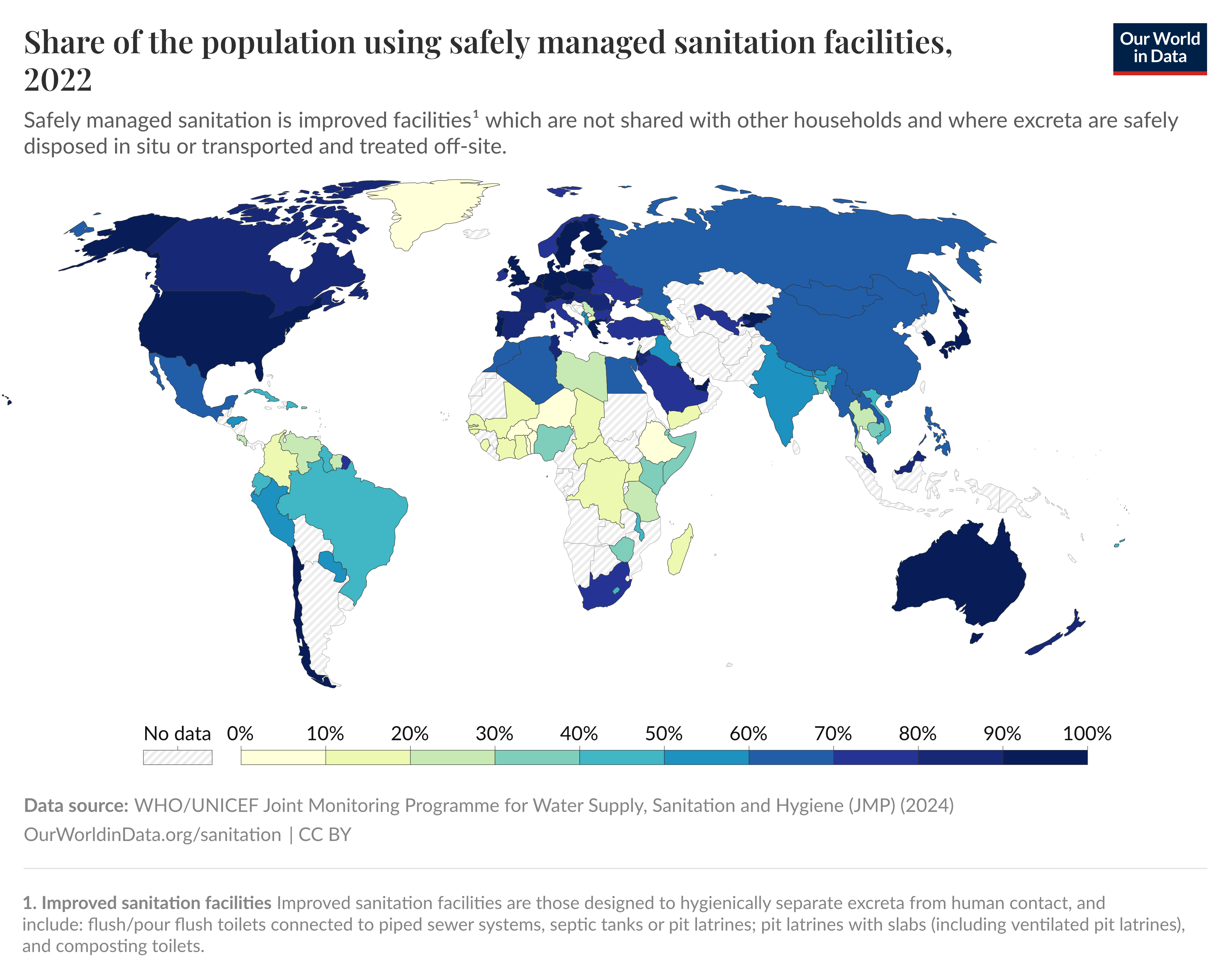
Share of population using safely managed sanitation facilities in 2022

Improved sanitation (related to but distinct from a "safely managed sanitation service") is a term used to categorize types of sanitation for monitoring purposes. It refers to the management of human feces at the household level. The term was coined by the Joint Monitoring Program (JMP) for Water Supply and Sanitation of UNICEF and WHO in 2002 to help monitor the progress towards Goal Number 7 of the Millennium Development Goals (MDGs). The opposite of "improved sanitation" has been termed "unimproved sanitation" in the JMP definitions. The same terms are used to monitor progress towards Sustainable Development Goal 6 (Target 6.2, Indicator 6.2.1) from 2015 onwards. Here, they are a component of the definition for "safely managed sanitation service".

The Joint Monitoring Program (JMP) for Water Supply and Sanitation has been publishing updates on the global sanitation situation on an annual basis. For example, in 2015 it was reported that 68% of the world's population had access to improved sanitation.

In 2015 this goal was replaced by Sustainable Development Goal 6, in which Target 6.2 states: "By 2030, achieve access to adequate and equitable sanitation and hygiene for all and end open defecation, paying special attention to the needs of women and girls and those in vulnerable situations." Indicator 6.2.1 is the "Proportion of population using (a) safely managed sanitation services and (b) a handwashing facility with soap and water".

== Definitions ==
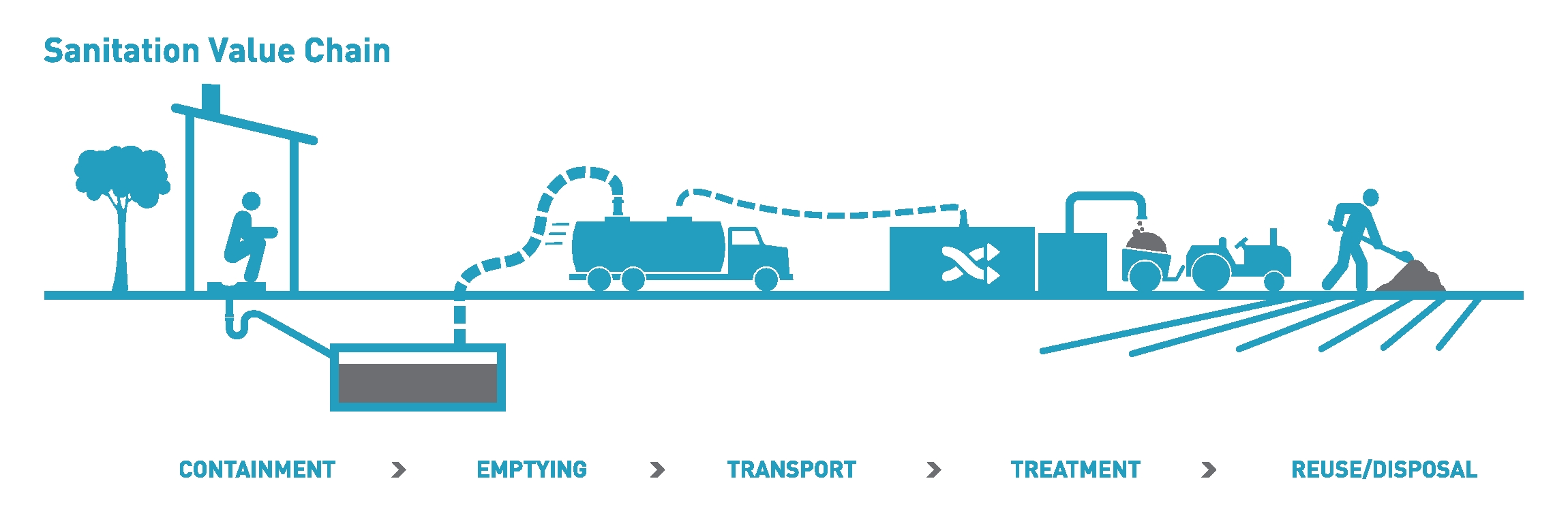
"Sanitation value chain" which starts with toilets

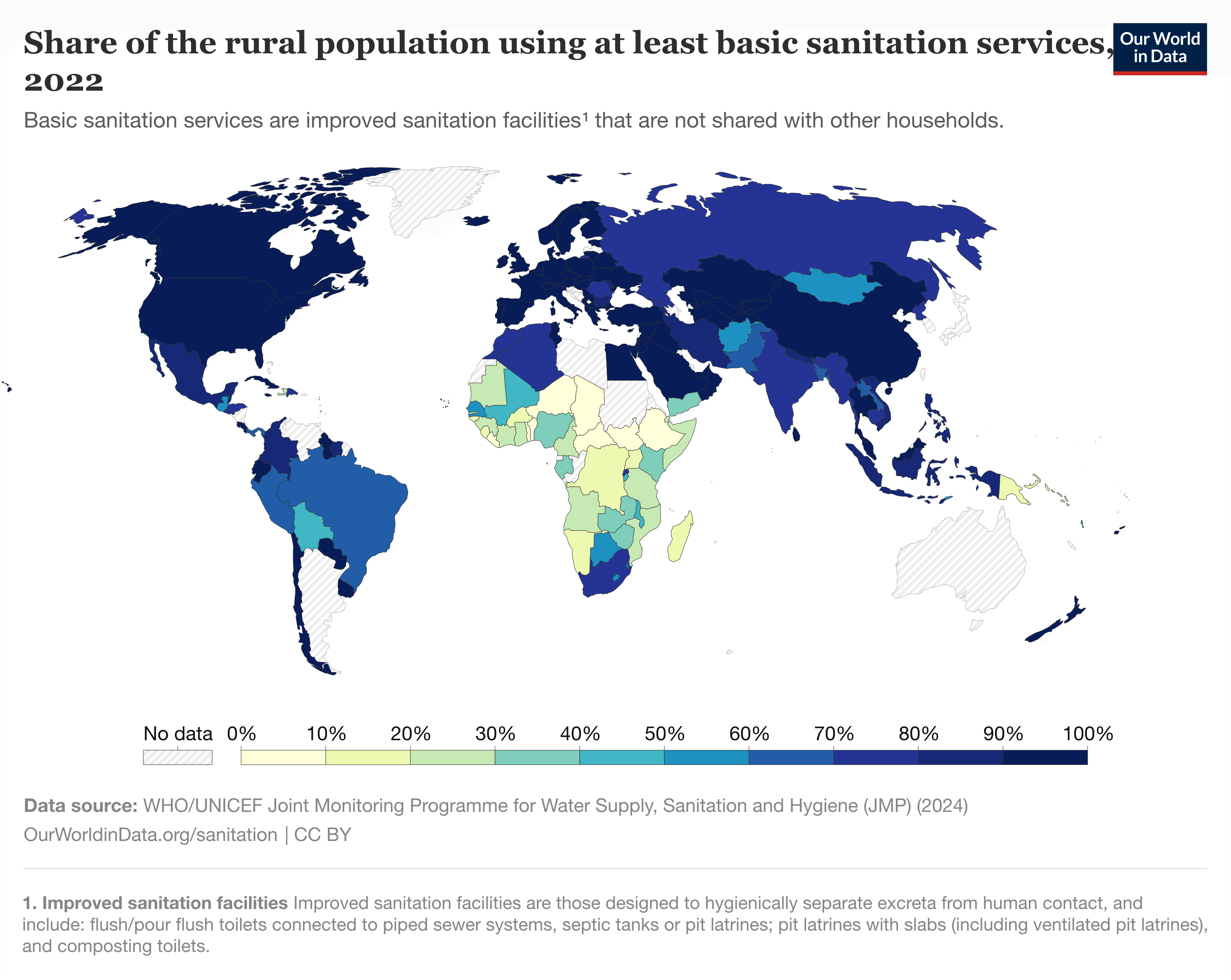

Share of rural population with improved sanitation facilities in 2022

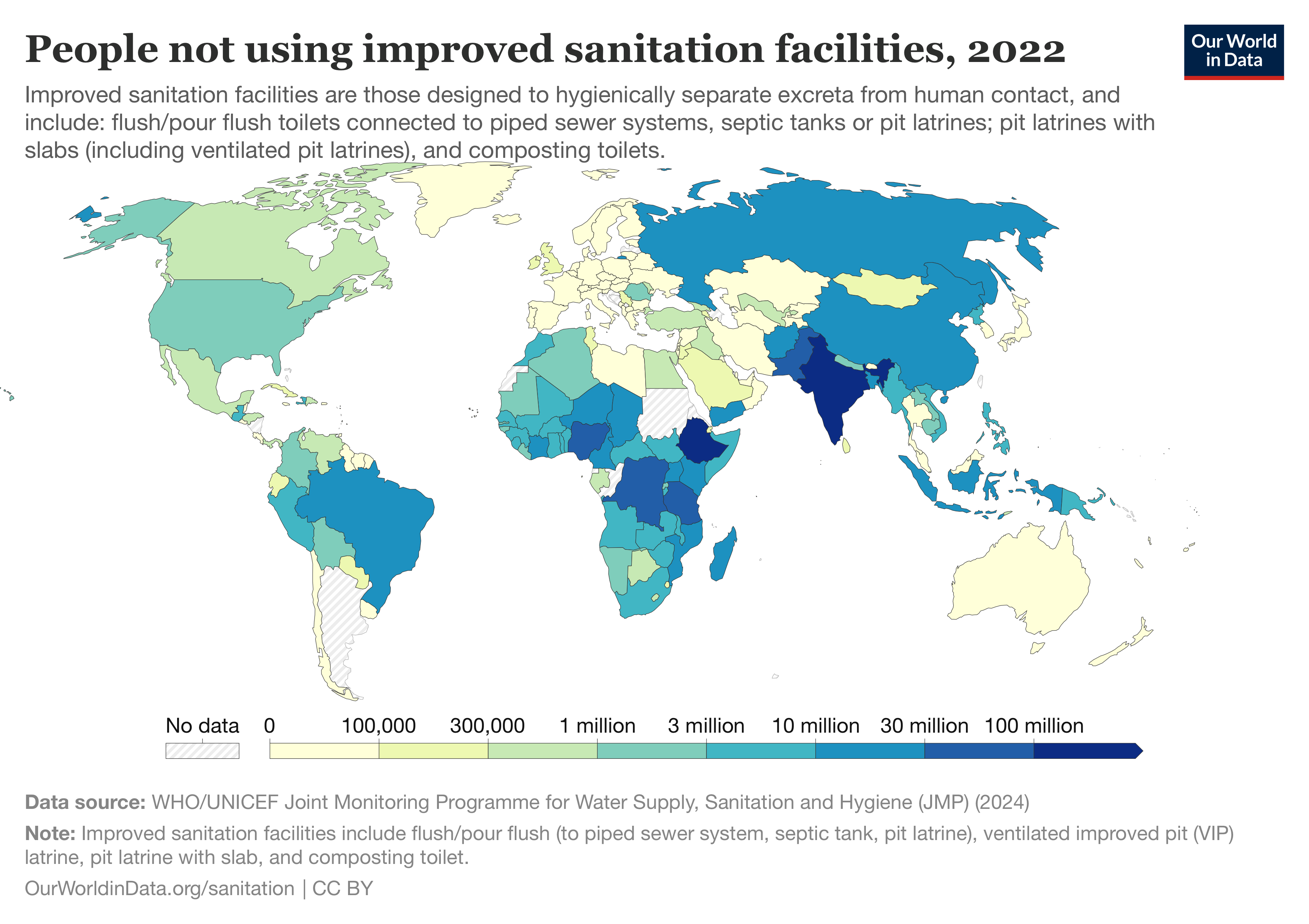
Number of people without access to improved sanitation in 2022

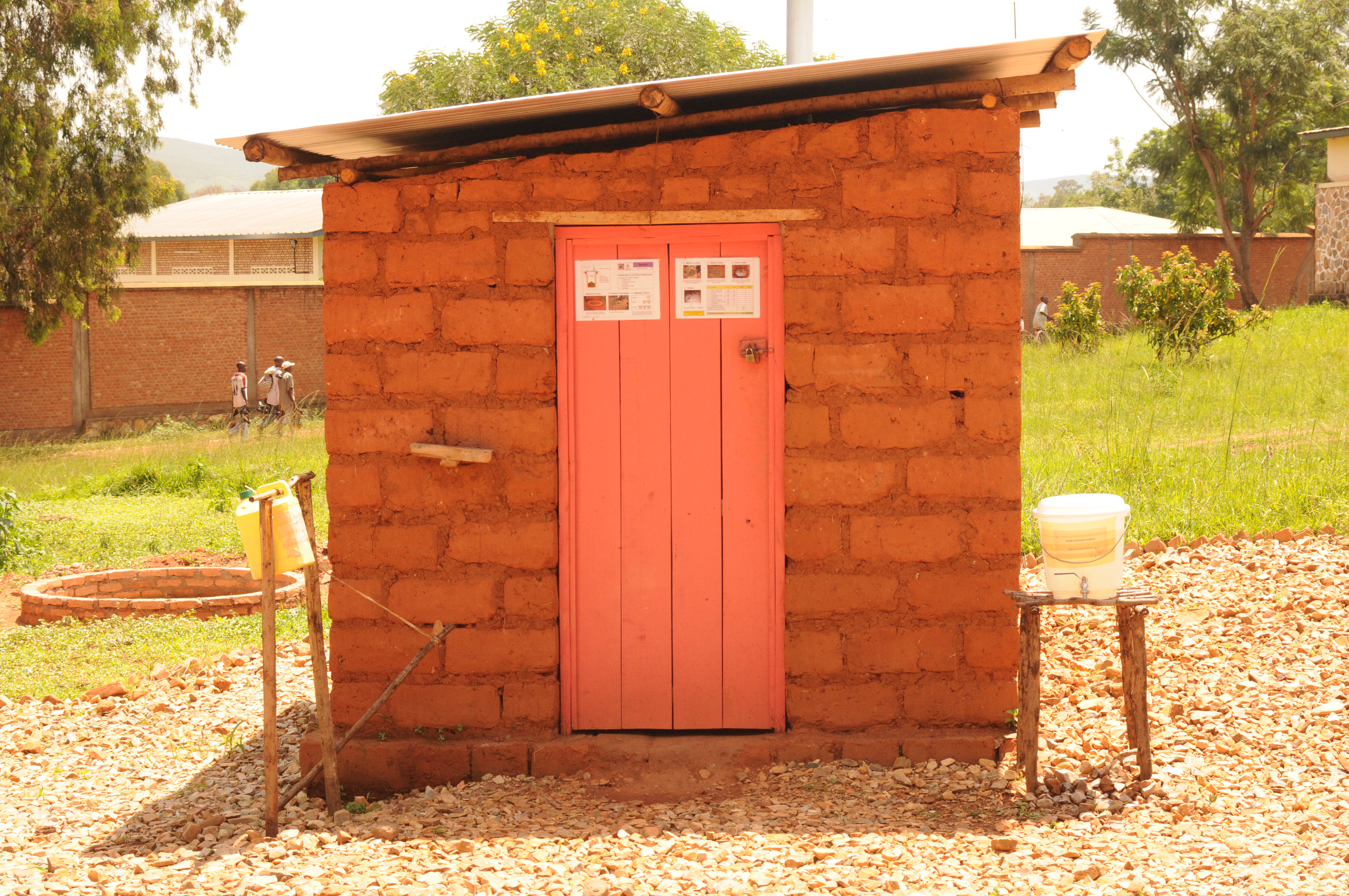
Improved sanitation example: pit latrine with a slab covering the drop hole and handwashing station in Burundi

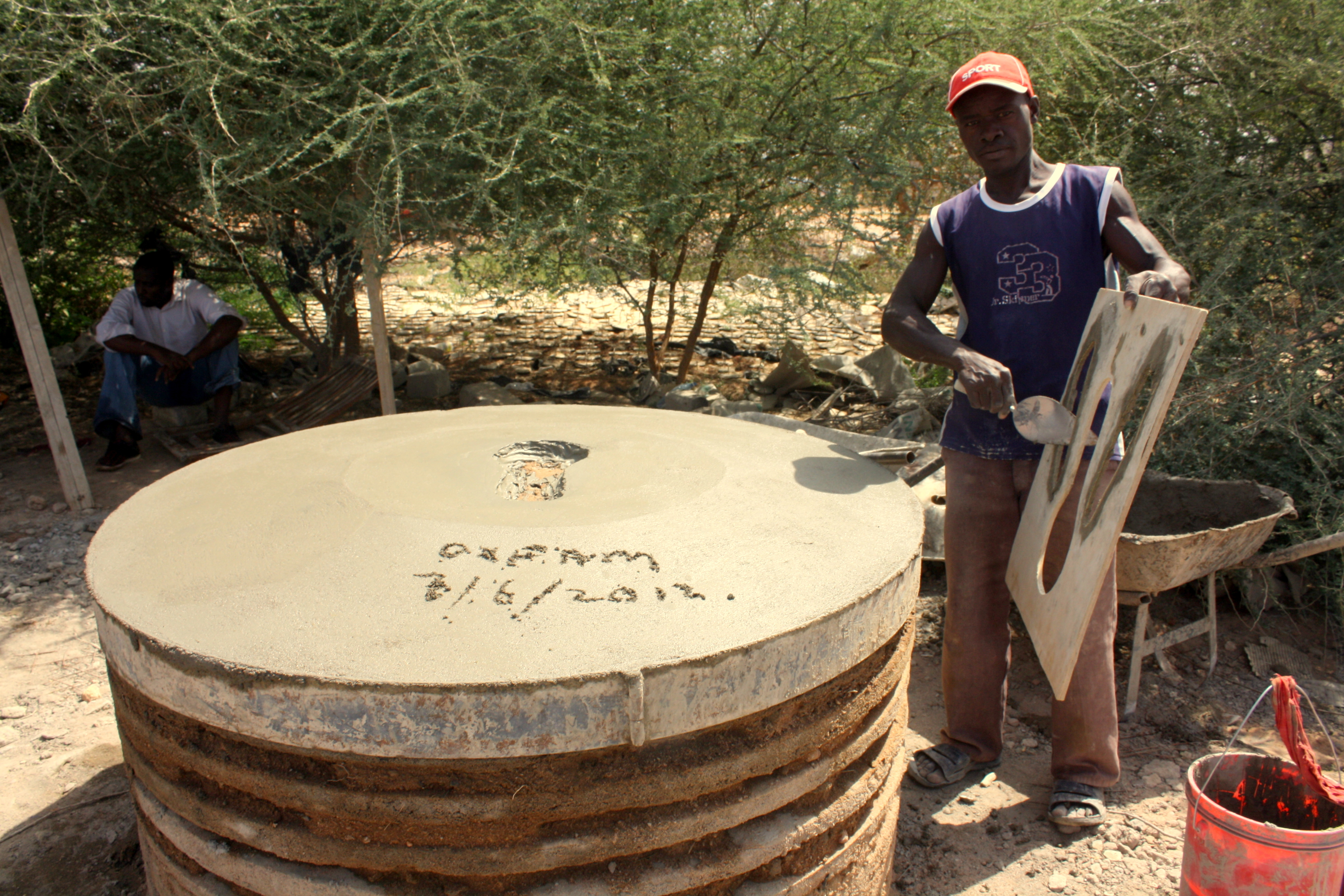
A mason building latrines to slabs which can be used for toilets to achieve improved sanitation in Dadaab, Kenya

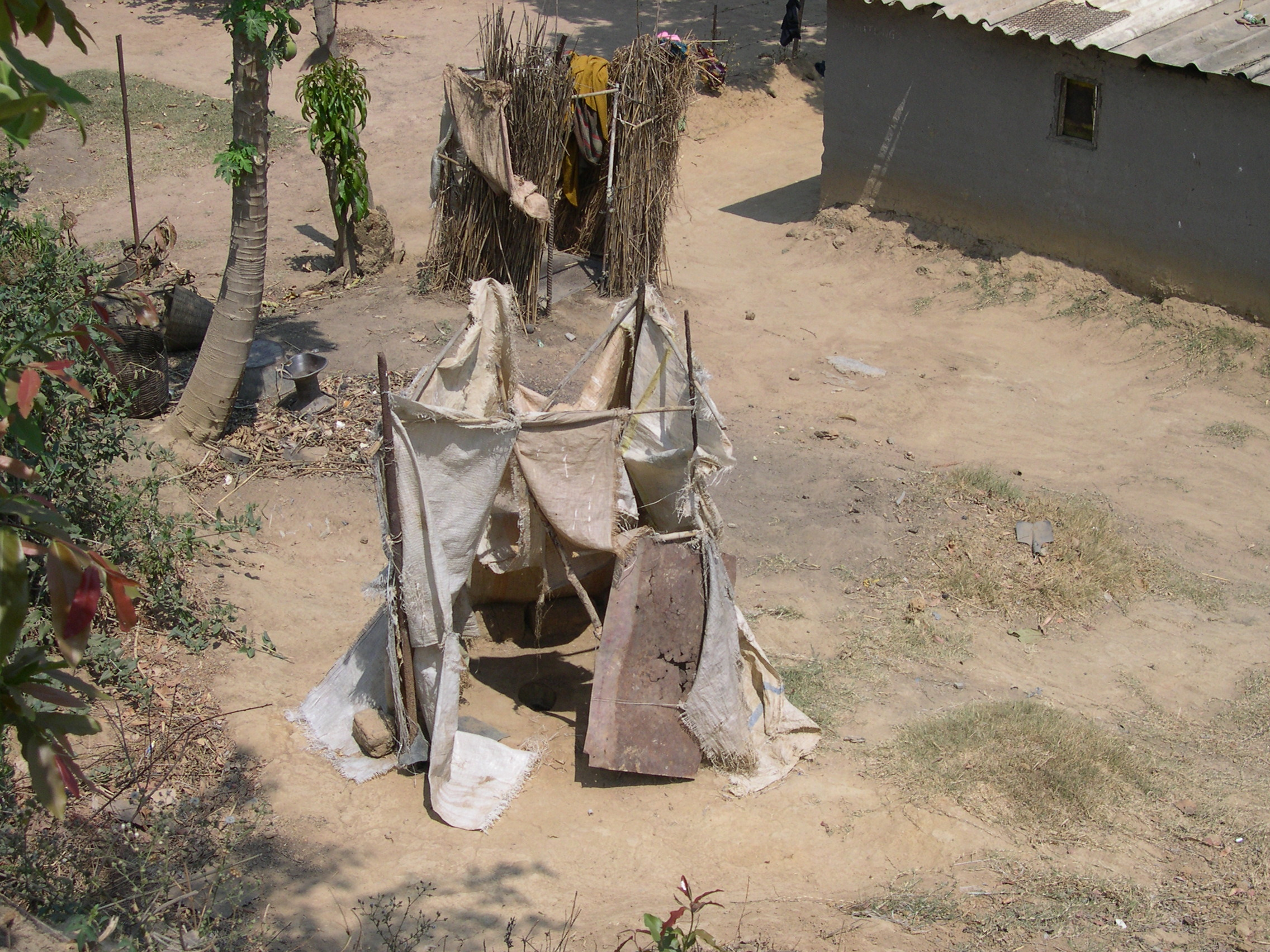
Unimproved sanitation example: pit latrine without slab in Lusaka, Zambia

=== During SDG period (2015 to 2030) ===
In 2017, the JMP defined a new term: "basic sanitation service". This is defined as the use of improved sanitation facilities that are not shared with other households. A lower level of service is now called "limited sanitation service" which refers to the use of improved sanitation facilities that are shared between two or more households. A higher level of service is called "safely managed sanitation". This is basic sanitation service where excreta is safely disposed of in situ or transported and treated offsite.

The definition of improved sanitation facilities is: Those facilities designed to hygienically separate excreta from human contact.

The ladder of sanitation services includes (from lowest to highest): open defecation, unimproved, limited, basic, safely managed.

=== During MDG period (2000 to 2015) ===
An improved sanitation facility is defined as one that hygienically separates human excreta from human contact. It is not necessarily identical with sustainable sanitation. The opposite of "improved sanitation" has been termed "unimproved sanitation" in the JMP definitions.

To allow for international comparability of estimates for monitoring the Millennium Development Goals (MDGs), the Joint Monitoring Program (JMP) for Water Supply and Sanitation defines "improved" sanitation as the following kind of toilets:

- Flush toilet
- Connection to a piped sewer system
- Connection to a septic system
- Flush / pour-flush to a pit latrine
- Pit latrine with slab
- Ventilated improved pit latrine (abbreviated as VIP latrine)
- Composting toilet

Sanitation facilities that are not considered as "improved" (also called "unimproved") are:

- Public or shared latrine (meaning a toilet that is used by more than one household)
- Flush/pour flush to elsewhere (not into a pit, septic tank, or sewer)
- Pit latrine without slab
- Bucket latrines
- Hanging toilet / latrine
- No facilities / bush / field/ flying toilets (open defecation)

Whilst "shared" toilets are not counted as improved sanitation, data about usage of shared toilets is nevertheless reported in the annual progress reports of the JMP.
