= Joint Monitoring Programme for Water Supply and Sanitation =

United Nations programme

The Joint Monitoring Programme (JMP) for Water Supply and Sanitation by WHO and UNICEF is the official United Nations mechanism tasked with monitoring progress towards the Sustainable Development Goal Number 6 (SDG 6) since 2016.

Previously, until 2015, JMP was tasked with monitoring the Millennium Development Goal (MDG) relating to drinking water and sanitation (MDG 7, Target 7c), which was to: "Halve, by 2015, the proportion of people without sustainable access to safe drinking-water and basic sanitation".

The JMP is housed within the World Health Organization and UNICEF, and supported by a Strategic Advisory Group of independent technical and policy experts as well as various Technical Task Forces convened around important specific topics.

== Activities ==
The JMP's four priority areas of activity for 2010-2015 were:

- maintaining the integrity of the JMP database and ensuring accurate global estimates;
- disseminating data to stakeholders;
- fulfilling the JMP's normative role in developing and validating target indicators;
- enhancing interaction between countries and JMP.

Every two years, the JMP release its latest estimates on the use of various types of drinking-water sources and sanitation facilities at the national, regional and global levels. The next report "Progress on household drinking water sanitation and hygiene: 2000-2020", was released in July 2021 at JMP website.

The JMP makes its data and information available through a variety of channels and formats, including workshops in countries, its major biennial reports and website, the UNICEF statistical website, and through Google Public Data. The data are also used by the World Bank and the World Health Organization's Statistical Information System (WHOSIS).

The JMP collaborates with other international and national organizations to strengthen global and domestic monitoring. The Programme also plays an advocacy role, highlighting the right to improved drinking water and sanitation for populations missing out and helping to target interventions.

In preparation for the post-2015 period (Sustainable Development Goals), the JMP had initiated four working groups which are developing potential future targets and indicators for water, sanitation, hygiene and equity/non-discrimination).

JMP Drinking water ladder
Safely Managed
Basic
Limited
Unimproved
Surface Water

As well as reporting on the national, regional and global use of different types of drinking water sources and sanitation facilities, the JMP actively supports countries in their efforts to monitor this sector and develop evidence based planning and management, plays a normative role in indicator formation and advocates on behalf of populations without improved water or sanitation.

== Vision and mission ==
The JMP vision is to accelerate progress towards universal and sustainable access for underserved populations in the developing world to safe water and basic sanitation, including the achievement of the MDG targets by 2015.

The JMP's mission is to be the trusted source of global, regional and national data on sustainable access to safe drinking-water and basic sanitation, for use by governments, donors, international organizations and civil society.

== Indicators ==
The JMP uses the following MDG indicators for monitoring:

- Proportion of population using an improved drinking-water source;
- Proportion of population using an improved sanitation facility.

An improved water source is defined by the JMP as one that, by nature of its construction or through active intervention, is likely to be protected from outside contamination, in particular from contamination with fecal matter. An improved sanitation facility is defined as one that is likely to hygienically separate human excreta from human contact, and some examples are given in the definition.

== Estimation methods ==
The JMP does not collect primary data itself. Instead, to the extent possible, it exclusively uses data from primary sources such as censuses and national household surveys that are conducted by national statistical authorities every few years. These surveys include the UNICEF-supported Multiple Indicator Cluster Surveys (MICS) and the USAID funded Demographic and Health Surveys (DHS). One of the challenges faced by the JMP is that the definitions for an improved water source and improved sanitation are not consistent across countries. Another challenge is that censuses and surveys are only conducted every few years. The JMP thus uses linear regression to estimate data for a given year in a particular country even if no survey or census was carried out in that year, in order to be able to compare data across countries for the given year.

=== Reasons for discrepancies of estimates ===
The indicators used by the JMP are controversial because they cannot always match cultural and local perceptions of what works or not, and can differ from national estimates. Discrepancies between national and international (JMP) coverage estimates are generally due to one or more of the following:

1) Use of different definitions of access including poorly defined access categories

2) Exclusion of users of shared sanitation facilities of an otherwise improved type, from those considered to have improved sanitation

3) Use of latest survey or census findings vs. use of an interpolated estimates based on linear regression

4) Use of different population estimates, including a different distribution of urban and rural populations

5) Use of “old” estimates which do not reflect the latest or all findings from new sample surveys or a new census

6) Use of “reported” line ministry data vs. use of independently verifiable data from sample surveys or censuses

=== Challenges ===
Complete information about drinking water safety, and the reliability and sustainability of drinking water and sanitation facilities is not available globally, and so these dimensions are not included in the current indicator definitions. Systematically testing the microbial and chemical quality of water at the national level in all countries is prohibitively expensive and logistically complicated. However, the JMP is working to include these challenging dimensions to the extent possible in future indicators.

Between 2002 and 2008, the Rapid Assessment of Drinking-Water Quality (RADWQ) project was designed and the quality of drinking-water from improved sources was evaluated in a number of pilot countries. In 2011, the JMP focused its thematic report on equity, safety and sustainability. In 2012 the JMP has been supporting the piloting of water quality testing alongside household surveys.

== See also ==
- Open defecation
