= Closet (disambiguation) =

A closet is an enclosed space, with a door, used for storage, particularly that of clothes.

Closet may also refer to:

- Closet (room), a type of cabinet
- Various types of toilet, notably:
  - Earth closet, a type of dry toilet
  - Pail closet, various types of dry toilet
  - Water closet (W.C.), another term for a flush toilet
- Closet (album), a 2022 album by Yoh Kamiyama
- Closet drama, a play intended for reading rather than performing
- Closet narcissism, narcissism with a deflated, inadequate self-perception

== See also ==
- The Closet (disambiguation)
- In the closet (disambiguation)
- Closeted, a metaphor for LGBTQ people who have not disclosed their sexual orientation or gender identity
- Passing (sociology), the ability of a person to be regarded as a member of an identity group or category that is often different from their own
