= Honey wagon =

Honey Wagon may refer to:

- Honeywagon (vehicle), a truck for collecting and carrying human excreta
- Vacuum truck, a tank truck with a vacuum designed to load material through suction lines
- Manure spreader, an agricultural machine used to distribute manure over a field as fertilizer

== See also ==
Honey dipper, a term of disparagement for those that work with honeywagons or do similar work.
