= Gutter cleaner =

The common usage of the word is referenced to the several different types of equipment that are used to clean the gutter and sewage systems on a community or industrial level.

Gutter cleaner may also refer to:

- Detergent, made to clean pipes
- Pipe cleaner, a short stiff cotton rod to clean a smoker's pipe, but commonly used to dislodge waste in household pipes
- Gully emptier, a person or machine that cleans gullies or gutters
- Street sweeper, a person or machine that sweeps gullies or gutters

== Sports ==
- Wicket-keeper, in cricket
- A slang term for the person who does groundskeeping in bowls and cricket, lawn tennis and athletics

== See also ==
- Rodding (disambiguation)
