= The Celluloid Closet =

The Celluloid Closet may refer to:

- The Celluloid Closet (book), a 1981 book by Vito Russo
  - The Celluloid Closet (film), a 1996 American documentary film based on the book of the same name

== See also ==
- The Closet (disambiguation)
