= Privy =

Privy is an old-fashioned term for an outdoor toilet, often known as an outhouse and by many other names. Privy may also refer to:

- Privy council, a body that advises the head of state
- Privy mark, a small mark in the design of a coin
- Privy Purse, the British sovereign's private income

== See also ==
- Privity
- Privy midden
