= Shiawase na Otona =

EP by Yoh Kamiyama
- Released: April 3, 2019 (CD); January 8, 2020 (Digital)
- Genre: J-pop
- Length: 27:00
- Language: Japanese
- Label: e.w.e. (Independent release)

Yoh Kamiyama chronology
Shiawase na Otona (2019)	Yumemiru Kodomo (2019)

Shiawase na Otona (しあわせなおとな) (styled in allcaps) is the first mini-album of Yoh Kamiyama, released independently under e.w.e. label name on April 3, 2019.

== Summary ==
This is the first Kamiyama's album under his real name, after working as vocaloid producer under his pseudonym, Yuukisan.

In the crossfade, voice-actor Hiroshi Kamiya participated as narrator.

On January 8, 2020 this album released digitally along with the pre-release of Gunjō.

== Chart ==
This album reached #16 on Oricon album chart on April 15, 2019.

== Track listing ==
Catalog number:

- Regular Edition - KMYM-001
- YELLOW cover Edition - KMYM-002
- Aoitoge cover Edition - KMYM-003

No.	Title	Length
1.	"TV Show (In the Bedroom)"	0:47
2.	"YELLOW"	2:58
3.	"青い棘 (Aoitoge)"	4:01
4.	"journey"	3:27
5.	"ユートピア (utopia)"	3:50
6.	"MILK"	3:20
7.	"ゆめでいいから (Yumede iikara)"	4:10
8.	"シュガーハイウェイ (Sugar Highway)"	4:28
