= Yoh Kamiyama =

Japanese musician, singer, & composer

Yoh Kamiyama 神山 羊
- Also known as: Yukisan, uki3, ewe, Ukisan (有機酸)
- Born: January 9 Gifu Prefecture, Japan
- Genres: J-POP
- Occupations: Singer, songwriter, composer
- Years active: 2014–present
- Label: Sony Music Associated Records
- Website: www.yohkamiyama.com

YouTube information
- Channel: Yoh Kamiyama
- Years active: 2012–present
- Genres: Vocaloid, J-POP
- Subscribers: 822 thousand
- Views: 321 million
- Last updated: 19 March 2025

Yoh Kamiyama (神山 羊, Kamiyama Yō; born January 9) is a Japanese musician, singer, and composer from Gifu Prefecture who is affiliated with Ignite Management and Sony Music Associated Records. He began his career in 2014 when he started uploading songs created using Vocaloid software on the Japanese video-sharing website Niconico under the name Yukisan (有機酸). In 2017, he started making songs using his own voice. He gained popularity in 2018 with his song "Yellow", which became popular on YouTube and TikTok. He made his major debut under Sony in 2020; his music has been featured in anime series such as Drifting Dragons and Horimiya.

== Career ==
Kamiyama's music career began in November 2014 when, under the name Yukisan (有機酸), he uploaded a Vocaloid song titled "Taikō Train" (退紅トレイン) on the Japanese video sharing website Nicovideo; the song's video has over 500,000 views as of November 2021. In 2017, he released the song "Quiet Room", which was his first song to feature his own voice; the song has over 12 million views on YouTube as of November 2021. In 2018, he began using the stage name Yoh Kamiyama and released the song "Yellow"; the song has been viewed on YouTube over 133 million times as of July 2023.

In 2020, Kamiyama made his major debut under Sony Music Associated Records. His first major single, "Gunjō" (群青), was released on March 4, 2020; the title song was used as the opening theme to the anime television series Drifting Dragons. His second major single "Irokōsui" (色香水) was released on March 10, 2021; the title song was used as the opening theme to the anime television series Horimiya. The single also served as the first release of Studio Nui, a new subsidiary label under Sony Music Associated Records.

On December 25, 2021, after approximately three and a half years, the VOCALOID song Mirai was released. It was a newly written track for the Project SEKAI Colorful Stage! feat. Hatsune Miku game, performed by the in-game unit Vivid BAD SQUAD. The music video for the song was also released on December 29 of the same year.

Starting January 4, 2022, their first regular radio program, "Yoh Kamiyama's Sheep Sleep Sweep (神山羊のSheep Sleep Sweep)", began airing on InterFM897.

== Discography ==
=== As Yukisan (有機酸) (uki3/ewe) ===
Yukisan (有機酸) discography
- Studio albums: 2
- EPs: 1
- Singles: 5
- Music videos: 25

- error (2016)
- facsimile (2017). Along with balloon.
- troy (2017)

=== As Yoh Kamiyama ===
Yoh Kamiyama discography
- Studio albums: 1
- EPs: 2
- Singles: 6
- Music videos: 13

- Shiawase na Otona (しあわせなおとな) (e.w.e., 2019).
- Yumemiru Kodomo (ゆめみるこども) (e.w.e., 2019).
- Gunjō (群青) (Sony Music Entertainment Japan, 2020).
- Irokōsui (色香水) (Sony Music Entertainment Japan, 2021).
- CLOSET. (Sony Music Entertainment Japan, 2022)
