= Yumemiru Kodomo =

EP by Yoh Kamiyama
- Released: October 23, 2019
- Genre: J-pop
- Label: e.w.e. (Independently released)

Yoh Kamiyama chronology
SHIAWASE NA OTONA (2019)	Yumemiru Kodomo (2019)	CLOSET (2022)

Yumemiru Kodomo (ゆめみるこども) is the 2nd mini-album of Yoh Kamiyama, released independently under e.w.e. label name on October 23, 2019.

== Summary ==
This is Kamiyama's 2nd mini-album under his real name, and released at least 6 months after his previous mini-album, Shiawase na Otona. Kamiyama said that this mini-album is related with his previous album.

== Chart ==
This album reached #33 on Oricon album chart on November 4, 2019.

== Track listing ==
Catalog number:

- Regular Edition - KMYM-004
- CUT cover Edition - KMYM-005
- Ice Cream cover Edition - KMYM-006

No.	Title	Length
1.	"Child Beat"
2.	"アイスクリーム (Ice Cream)"
3.	"bunny"
4.	"Ope (Till that Time)"
5.	"CUT"
6.	"夜を終わらせないで (Yoru wo Owarasenaide)"
7.	"ヘルタースケルター (Helter Skelter)"
8.	"おやすみ、かみさま (Oyasumi, Kamisama)"
