= In the closet =

In the closet may refer to:

- Closeted, a label for lesbian, gay, bisexual, and transgender (LGBT) people who choose not to or have yet to come out of the closet, i.e. disclose their sexual orientation or gender identity, regardless of how they self-identify
- Nicodemite, a person with a hidden religious affiliation
- Protestants pretending to be Catholic, known as Crypto-Protestantism
- Hiding aspects of one's identity, known as "passing"
- Skeleton in the closet (or "cupboard"), a reference to an undisclosed fact or activity from one's past that might have a negative impact on one's public image

== Arts and entertainment ==
- "In the Closet", a 1991 song by Michael Jackson
- In the Closet, a 2008 gay-themed short film directed by Jody Wheeler starring Brent Corrigan and J. T. Tepnapa

== See also ==
- The Closet (disambiguation)
- Closet (disambiguation)
