= Charles Bland Radcliffe =

English physician (1822–1889)

Charles Bland Radcliffe (1822–1889) was an English physician, known for work on diseases of the nervous system.

== Life ==
Born at Brigg, North Lincolnshire on 2 June 1822, he was eldest son of Charles Radcliffe, a Wesleyan minister; John Netten Radcliffe was his younger brother. He was educated at Batley grammar school and was then apprenticed to Mr. Hall, a general practitioner at Wortley. He finished his medical training in Leeds, Paris, and London—in Paris he studied under Claude Bernard. He graduated M.B. at London University in 1845, and M.D. in 1851.

Radcliffe became a licentiate of the Royal College of Physicians of London in 1848, and was elected a Fellow in 1858. He was Gulstonian lecturer in 1860, and Croonian lecturer in 1873. He subsequently became a councillor of the College of Physicians, and in 1875–6 he acted as its censor.

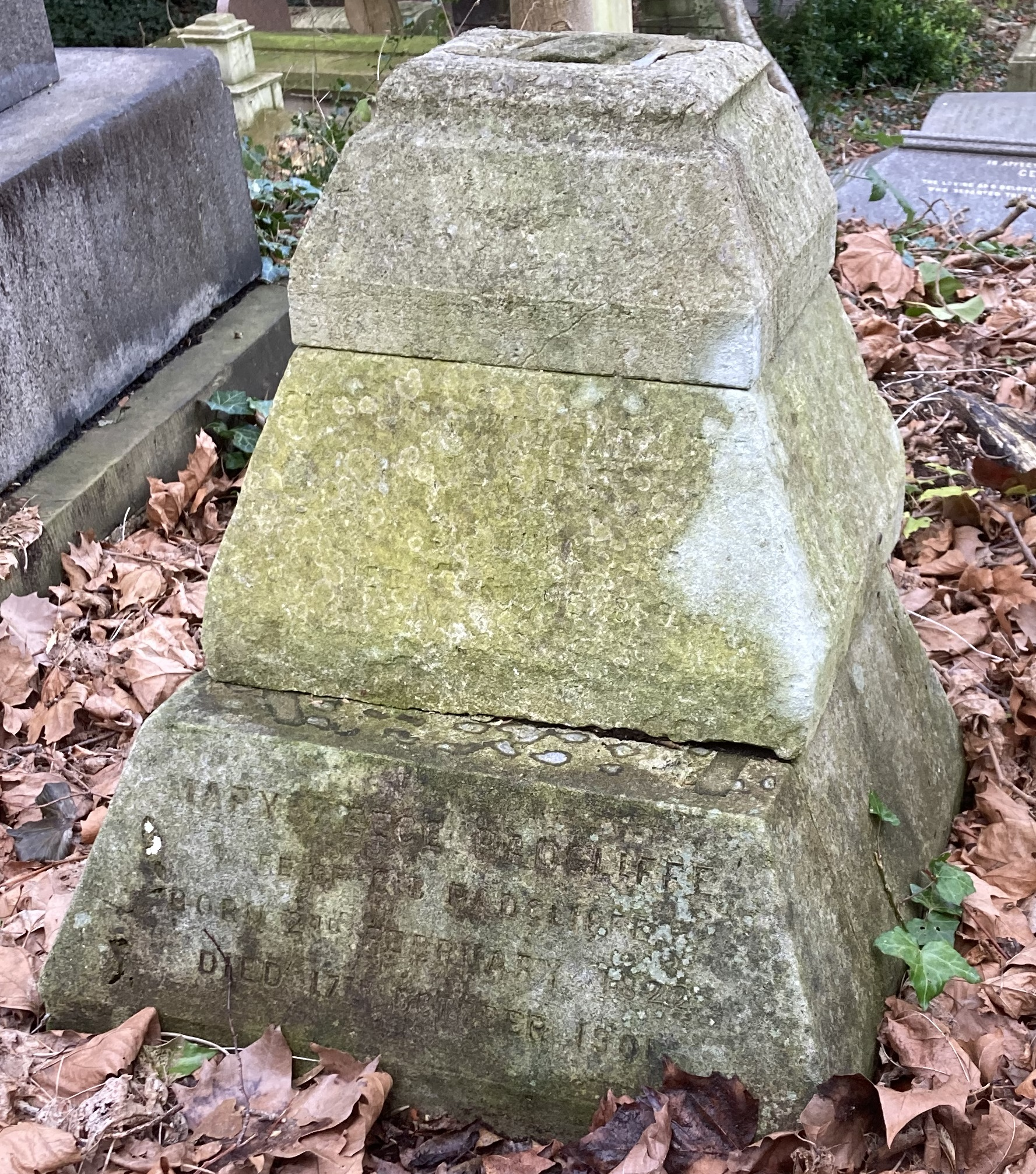
Radcliffe family grave in Highgate Cemetery

In 1853, Radcliffe was appointed assistant physician to Westminster Hospital, where he succeeded to the office of full physician 25 April 1857, and was elected to the consulting staff on 27 May 1873. He lectured on botany and materia medica, in the medical school attached to the hospital. In 1863 he was appointed physician to the National Hospital for the Paralysed and Epileptic in Queen Square, as successor to Charles Brown-Séquard, and it was there that he made a reputation for work on the diseases of the nervous system.

Radcliffe died very suddenly on 18 June 1889, and was buried with his brother John in a family grave on the western side of Highgate cemetery.

== Works ==
Radcliffe was one of the early British investigators of the electrical physiology of muscle and nerve: John Burdon-Sanderson called him a vitalist, for whom electricity took the place of the "vital principle". He published:

- Proteus, or the Law of Nature, London, 1850.
- The Philosophy of Vital Motion, 1851.
- Epilepsy and other Affections of the Nervous System marked by Tremor, Convulsion, or Spasm, 1854; 2nd edit. 1858; 3rd edit. 1861.
- Lectures on Epilepsy, Pain, Paralysis, and certain other disorders of the Nervous System, 1864.
- Articles in Reynolds's System of Medicine, 1868 and 1872.
- Dynamics of Nerve and Muscle, 1871.
- Vital Motion as a Mode of Physical Motion, 1876.
- The Connection between Vital and Physical Motion: a Conversation, privately printed, 1881.
- Behind the Tides, privately printed.

Radcliffe was joint editor with William Harcourt Ranking from 1845 to 1873 of Ranking's Abstract of the Medical Sciences.

== Family ==
Radcliffe married, in 1851, Mary Reece Urling, daughter of George Frederick Urling, but left no issue.
