= Honeywagon (vehicle) =

Vehicle carrying human excreta

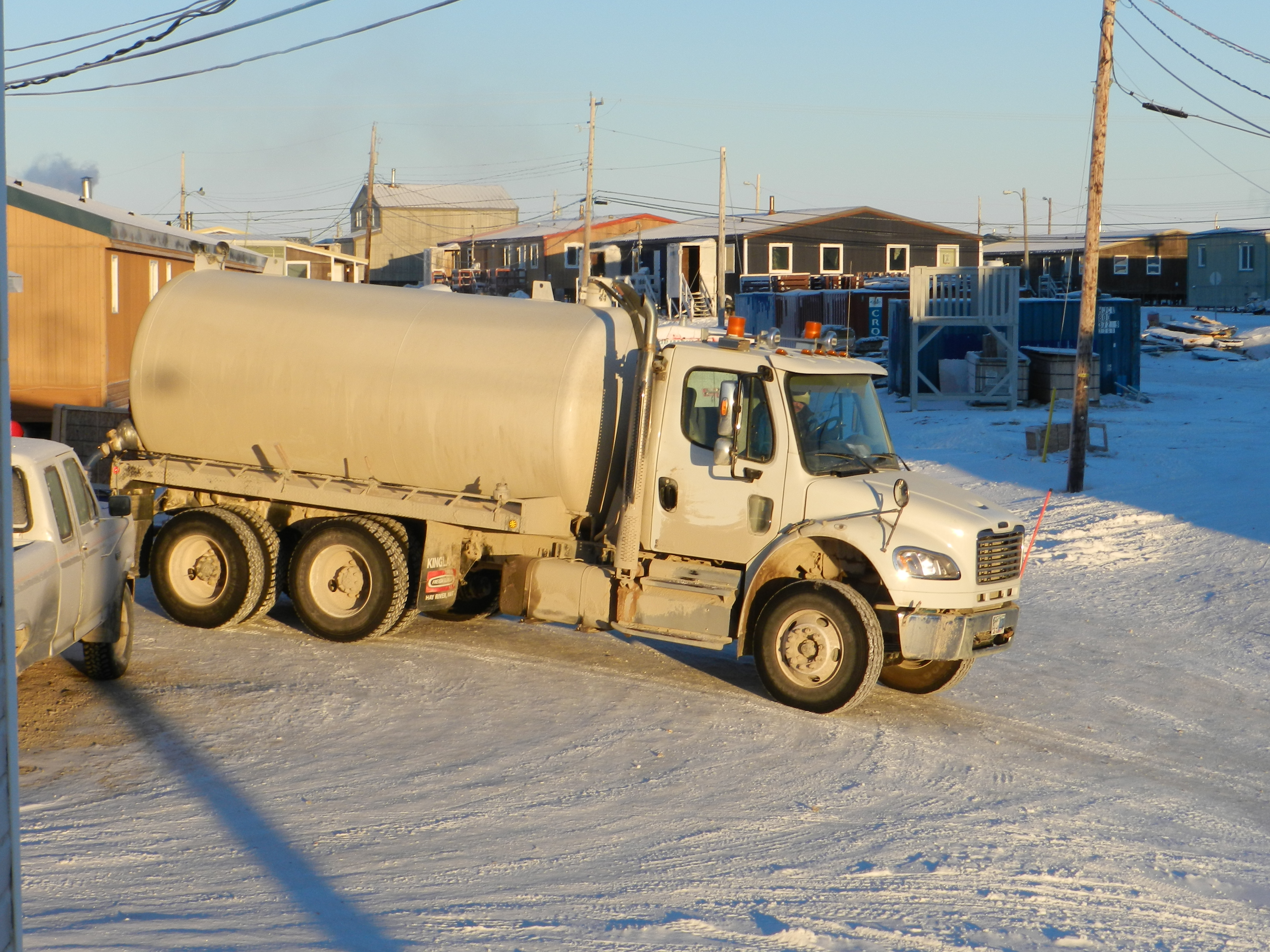
A honey wagon (vacuum truck) in Cambridge Bay

A honeywagon or honeycart is the slang term for a "vacuum truck" for collecting and carrying human excreta. The first reported use of the term is listed as 1891. These vehicles may be used to empty the sewage tanks of buildings, aircraft lavatories, passenger train toilets and at campgrounds and marinas as well as portable toilets. The folk etymology behind the name 'honeywagon' is thought to relate to the honey-colored liquid that comes out of it when emptying the holding tanks.

== History ==
The honey wagon was originally a horse-drawn vehicle that went through back alleys to collect human excreta. Houses at that time did not have flush toilets or indeed any form of indoor sanitation beyond the chamberpot. In rural areas the outhouse (privy) is associated with a pit latrine of various sorts, but many towns and cities depended on some variant of the pail closet, which needed frequent emptying. At each outdoor toilet, the driver (honey dipper) would stop the wagon, flip up the back hatch door (trap-door) of the outhouse, slide out the pail (bucket), pick it up, and dump the contents into one of eight oak half-barrels in the wagon box. The half-barrels had no lids. These toilets were known as dunnies in Australia, hence the "dunnywagon" driven by "dunnymen".

== Use in film and television industry ==
A honeywagon is a portable toilet unit used in the film and television industry. Many take the form of a specialized semi-trailer.

In the UK a honeywagon usually refers to a set of toilets used by the cast and crew. These come in all shapes and sizes - either trailer-base or built into the box body of a truck. In America, the term honeywagon is usually given to a truck, trailer or combination of both with a number of dressing rooms for the actor. These either have individual toilets or a communal set built in. Some honeywagons will be just two large toilets. Others are a combination of variously sized rooms for specific purposes: these rooms can be private dressing rooms assigned to a single person, larger rooms configured for the wardrobe or makeup departments, small individual toilets for the crew to share, and multiple user or individual shower rooms for bathing.

== Operation ==
The operator connects a hose to the discharge outlet on the recreational vehicle, boat or building and pumps the waste into the wagon's holding tank. When the tank is full, the operator empties the tank at an approved holding tank dump station or sewage lagoon.

== See also ==
- Honey bucket, another name for a bucket toilet
- Manual scavenging
- Manure spreader
