= Night soil =

Archaic term for excreta from latrines

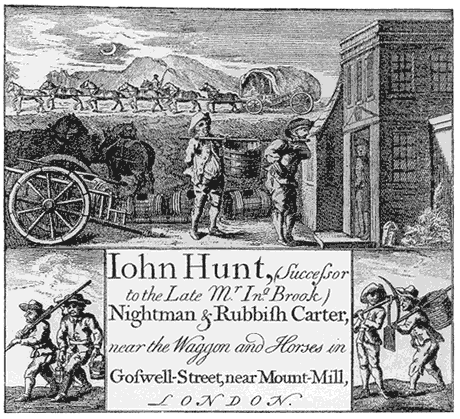
18th-century London nightman's calling card

Night soil is a historical euphemism for human excreta collected from cesspools, privies, pail closets, pit latrines, privy middens, septic tanks, etc. This material was removed from the immediate area, usually at night, by workers employed in this trade. Sometimes it could be transported out of towns and sold on as a fertilizer.

Another definition is "untreated excreta transported without water (e.g. via containers or buckets)". Night soil was produced as a result of a sanitation system in areas without sewer systems or septic tanks. In this system of waste management, human feces are collected without dilution in water.

Night soil is largely an outdated term used in historical contexts, while fecal sludge management remains an ongoing challenge, particularly in developing countries.

== Collection and disposal ==
Feces were excreted into a container such as a chamber pot, and sometimes collected in the container with urine and other waste ("slops", hence slopping out). The excrement in the pail was often covered with ashes or earth (soil), which may have contributed to the term "night soil". Often the deposition or excretion occurred within the residence, such as in a shophouse. This system may still be used in isolated rural areas or in urban slums in developing countries. The material was collected for temporary storage and disposed of depending on local custom.

Disposal has varied through time. A night soil collector usually arrived during the night, hence its name. The vehicle used for collection has been called a night-cart, and its operator a night-man or night-cart man.

In isolated rural areas such as in farms, the householders usually disposed of the night soil themselves.

== Uses in agriculture ==
Human excreta may be attractive as fertilizer because of the high demand for fertilizer and the relative availability of the material to create night soil. In areas where native soil is of poor quality, the local population may weigh the risk of using night soil.

The use of unprocessed human feces as fertilizer is a risky practice as it may contain disease-causing pathogens. Nevertheless, in some developing nations it is still widespread. Common parasitic worm infections, such as ascariasis, in these countries are linked to night soil use in agriculture, because the helminth eggs are in feces and can thus be transmitted from one infected person to another person (fecal-oral transmission of disease).

These risks are reduced by proper fecal sludge management, e.g. via composting. The safe reduction of human excreta into compost is possible. Some municipalities create compost from the sewage sludge, but then recommend that it be used only on flower beds — not vegetable gardens.

== History ==
=== Ancient Greece ===
The use of sewage as fertilizer was common in ancient Attica. The sewage system of ancient Athens collected the sewage of the city in a large reservoir and then channelled it to the Cephissus river valley for use as fertilizer.

=== China, Hong Kong, and Singapore ===
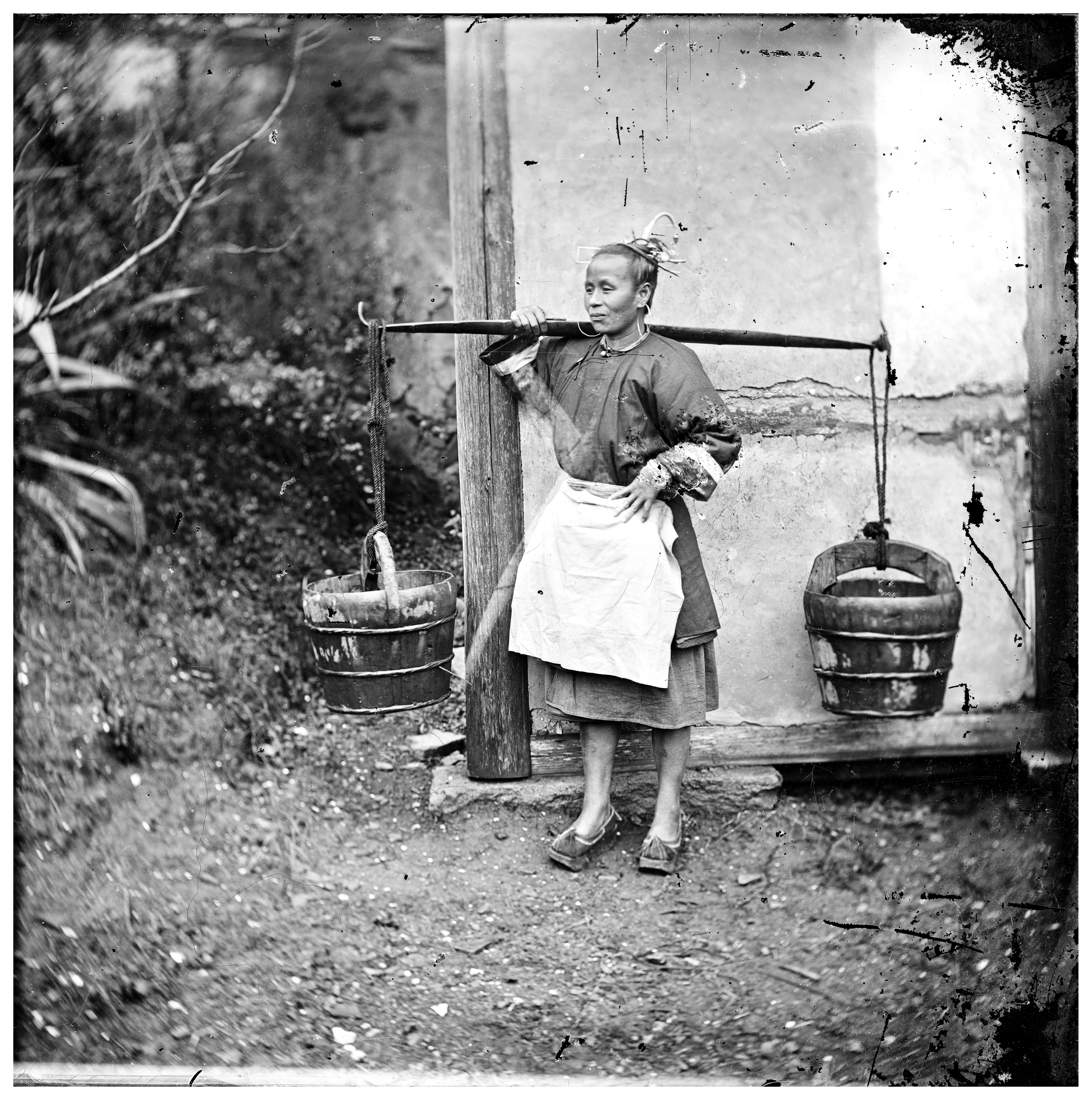
A woman carrying buckets of night-soil, photographed in 1871.

At least as early as the Western Han dynasty, there were mentions of using human feces and urine as fertilizers in Fan Shengzhi shu (The book of Fan Shengzhi on agriculture), but it did not become a common practice until the Song dynasty, along with health warnings when using them. The term is known, or even infamous, among the generations that were born in parts of China or Chinatowns (depending on the development of the infrastructure) before 1960. Post-World War II Chinatown, Singapore, before the independence of Singapore, utilized night-soil collection as a primary means of waste disposal, especially as much of the infrastructure was damaged and took a long time to rebuild following the Battle of Singapore and subsequent Japanese occupation. Following the development of the economy and the standard of living after independence, the night soil system in Singapore is now an anecdote from the time of colonial rule when new systems developed.

The collection method is generally very manual and heavily relies on close human contact with the waste. During the Nationalist era when the Kuomintang ruled mainland China, as well as Chinatown in Singapore, the night soil collector usually arrived with spare and relatively empty honey buckets to exchange for the full honey buckets. The method of transporting the honey buckets from individual households to collection centers was very similar to delivering water supplies by an unskilled laborer, with the exception that the item being transported was not at all potable and it was being delivered from the household, rather than to the household. The collector would hang full honey buckets onto each end of a pole he carried on his shoulder and then proceeded to carry it through the streets until he reached the collection point.

Chinese has a similar euphemism for night soil collection, 倒夜香 dou2 je6 hoeng1, which literally means "emptying nocturnal fragrance".

=== Japan ===
The reuse of feces as fertilizer was common in Japan. In the city of Edo, compost merchants gathered feces to sell to farmers. That was good additional income for apartment owners. Human excreta of rich people were sold at higher prices because their diet was better; presumably, more nutrients remained in their excreta. Various historic documents dating from the 9th century detail the disposal procedures for toilet waste.

Selling human waste products as fertilizers became much less common after World War II, both for sanitary reasons and because of the proliferation of chemical fertilizers, and less than 1% is used for night soil fertilization. The presence of the United States occupying force, by whom the use of human waste as fertilizer was seen as unhygienic and suspect, was also a contributing factor: "the Occupationaires condemned the practice, and tried to prevent their compatriots from eating vegetables and fruit from the local markets".

=== Mexico and Central America ===
Various Mesoamerican civilizations used human feces to fertilize their crops. The Aztecs, in particular, are well known for their famous chinampas, artificial islands made of mud and human waste used to grow crops that could be harvested up to seven times a year. Current research has placed the origins of chinampas in an Aztec town of Culhuacan in the year 1100 C.E. They were constructed by first fencing an area between 30 m x 2.5 m and 91 m x 9 m, using wattle. Then filled in with mud, sediment, feces and decaying vegetation. To stabilize the chinampas, trees were often planted on the corners, primarily āhuexōtl (Salix bonplandiana) or āhuēhuētl (Taxodium mucronatum). Chinampas were very common before Spanish conquest and are still found in Mexico today.

=== United Kingdom ===
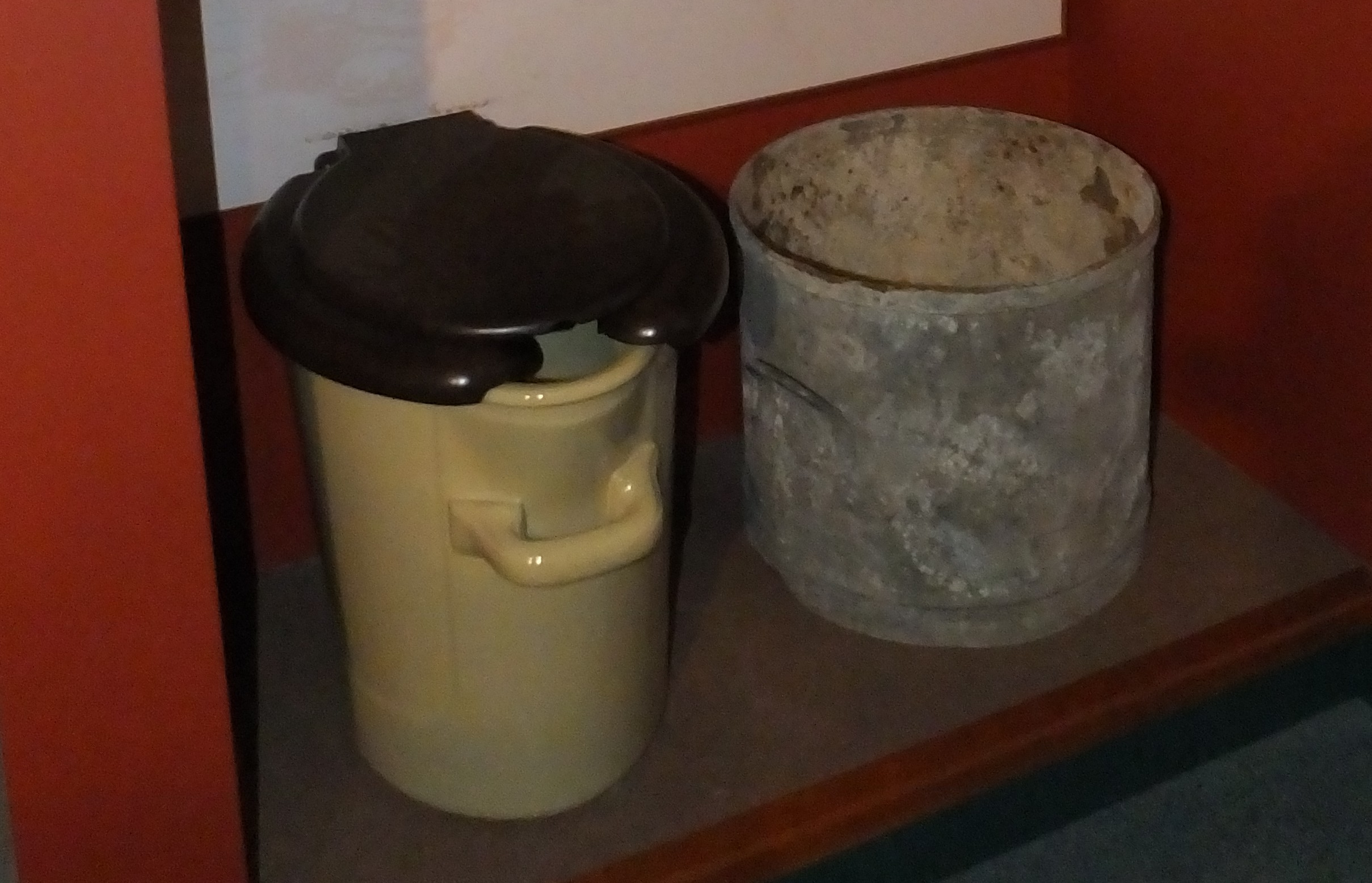
Industrially produced "sanitary ware", now in the Gladstone Pottery Museum

In Britain during the Medieval period, it was not uncommon for human feces to be spread on farms for use as fertilizer.

A gong farmer was the term used in Tudor England for a person employed to remove human excrement from privies and cesspits. Gong farmers were only allowed to work at night and the waste they collected had to be taken outside the city or town boundaries.

The rapid industrialisation of England during the 19th century led to mass urbanisation, over-crowding, and epidemics. One response was the development of the "Rochdale system", in which the town council arranged for the collection of night soil from outhouses attached to each dwelling or group of dwellings (see pail closet). A later response was the passage of the Public Health Act 1875, which led to the creation of byelaws regarding housing, mandating one outhouse per house. These were "earth closets" (not water closets i.e. WCs) and depended on "night soil men" or "nightmen".

=== Australia ===
Before reticulated sewerage systems replaced them, major cities in Australia had a nightsoil collection system, with its own special terms. "Nightsoil" was collected from "dunnies" (outhouses/water closets) at the rear of dwellings, often accessed by "dunny lanes" (narrow laneways) by a "dunny man" (a nightsoil collector). Most inner-city areas were connected to the sewer in the early 1900s, but it was not until the 1970s that all suburban areas were sewered. [see Sheppard v Smith [2021] NSWSC 1207 at paragraphs 22 and 29].

== Current examples ==
=== India ===
In India, the practice of manually handling and disposing night soil is called manual scavenging. Employment of Manual Scavengers and Creation of Dry Latrines (Prohibition) Act 1993 has made manual scavenging illegal.

Despite the laws, manual scavenging was reported in many states including Maharashtra, Gujarat, Madhya Pradesh, Uttar Pradesh, and Rajasthan in 2014. In 2021, the National Human Rights Commission of India observed that eradication of manual scavenging as claimed by state and local governments is far from over. Government data shows that in the period 1993–2021, 971 people died due to cleaning of sewers and septic tanks.

=== Japan ===
Modern Japan still has areas with ongoing night soil collection and disposal. The Japanese name for the "outhouse within the house" style toilet, where night soil is collected for disposal, is kumitori benjo (汲み取り便所). The proper disposal or recycling of sewage remains an important research area that is highly political.

=== North Korea ===
Night soil is often used as fertilizer in the Democratic People's Republic of Korea (North Korea.) It is used in order to prevent fertilizer shortages. Because of this, North Korean defectors are sometimes reported to have parasites.

== See also ==
- Composting toilet
