= Vacuum truck =

Tank truck with a pump designed to load material through suction lines

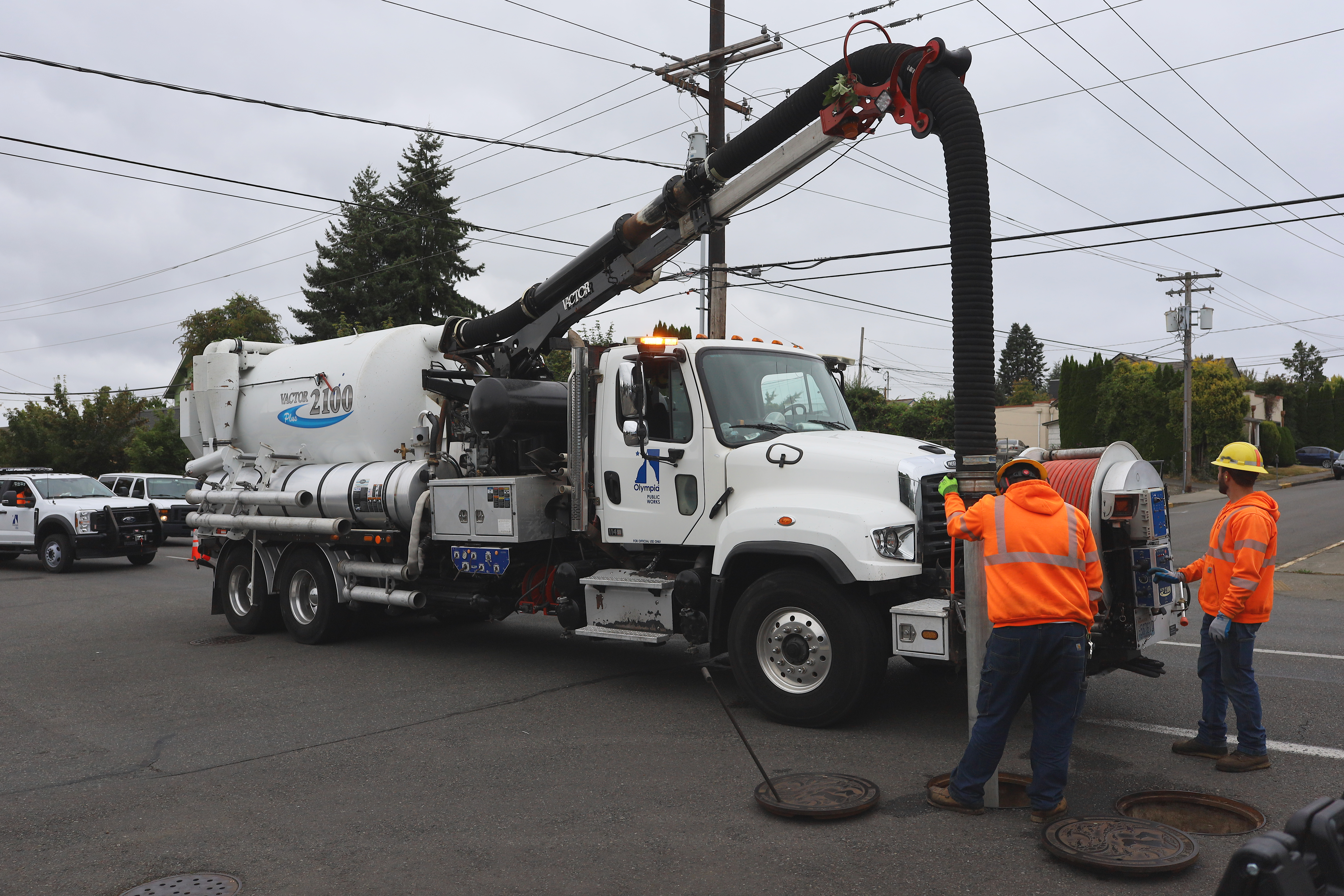
Vactor 2100 operating in Olympia, Washington, August 2025

A vacuum truck, vacuum tanker, vactor truck, vactor, vac-con truck, vac-con is a tank truck that has a pump and a tank. The pump is designed to pneumatically suck liquids, sludges, slurries, or the like from a location (often underground) into the tank of the truck. The objective is to enable transport of the liquid material via road to another location. Vacuum trucks transport the collected material to a treatment or disposal site, for example a sewage treatment plant.

A common material to be transported is septage (or more broadly: fecal sludge) which is human excreta mixed with water, e.g. from septic tanks and pit latrines. They also transport sewage sludge, industrial liquids, or slurries from animal waste from livestock facilities with pens. Vacuum trucks can also be used to prepare a site for installation or to access underground utilities. These trucks may use compressed air or water to break up the ground safely, without risk of damage, before installation may begin.

Vacuum trucks can be equipped with a high pressure pump if they are used to clean out sand from sewers.

== Other names used ==
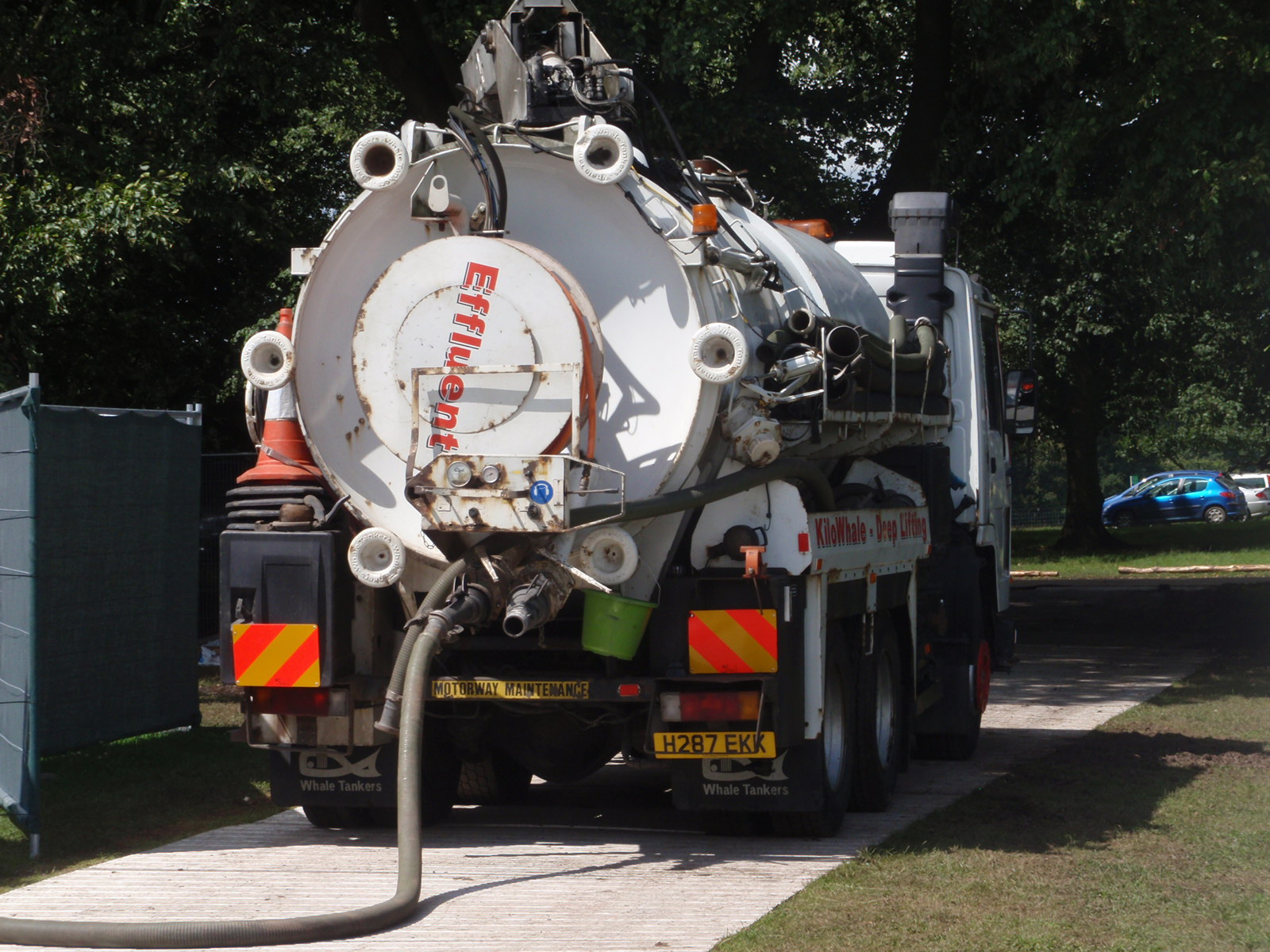
Vacuum tanker used to collect sewage at Tatton Park flower show, July 2009, England

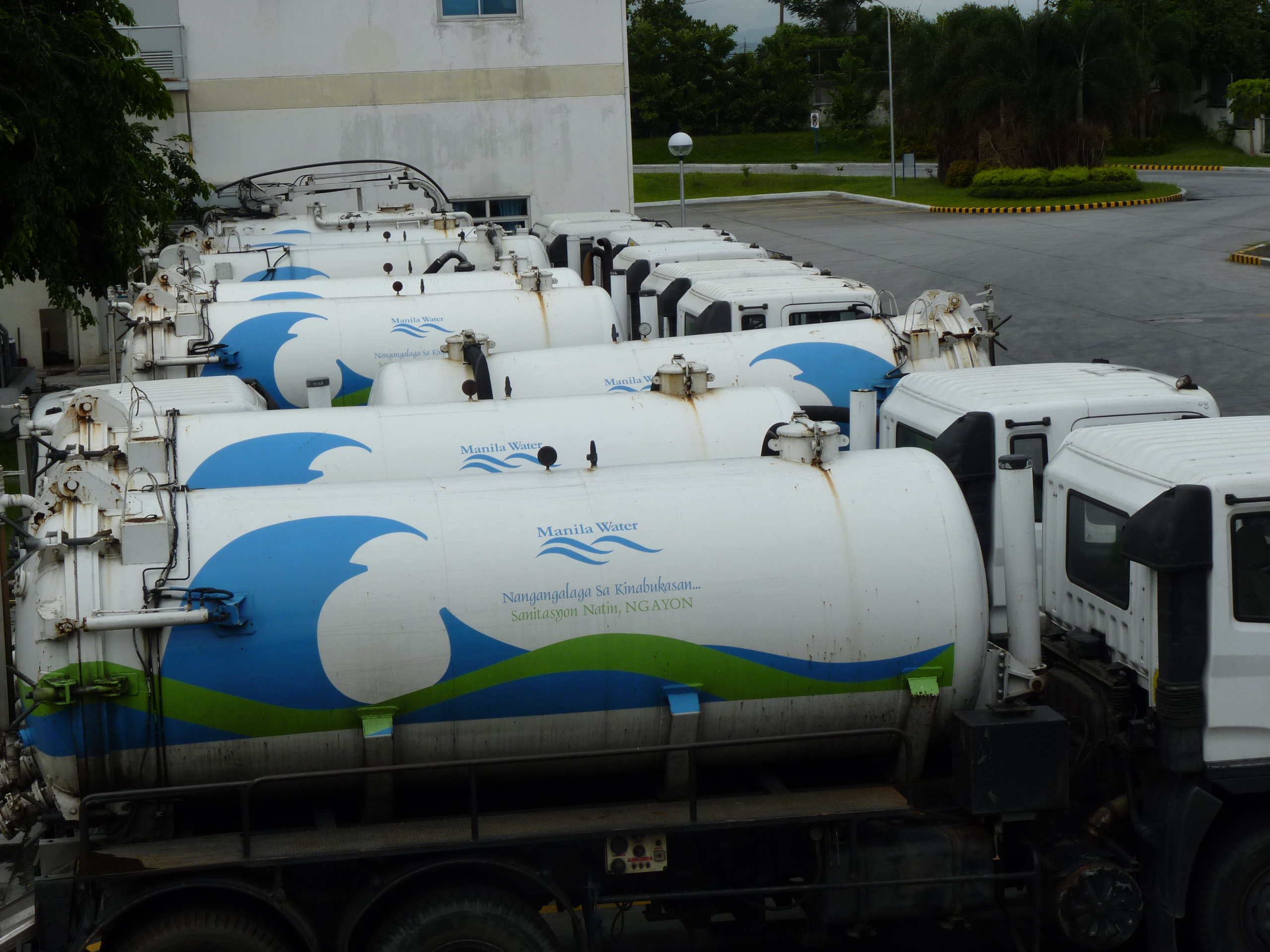
Fleet of vacuum trucks used for desludging services by Manila Water in Manila, Philippines

Other names used for vacuum trucks: vacuum tanker, "Sucker truck" or vac-trucks (in Australia) or "Sewer Sucker", "Hydro-vac", or "vac-trucks" (in Canada) or "Exhauster truck" (in Rwanda, Malawi & Kenya). Slang terms include: "honey truck", "honey sucker" (in India and South Africa), and "honeywagon", all (probably) derived from honey bucket.

When a vacuum truck is used to transport fecal sludge then it can also be called "fecal sludge truck".

== Design and configurations ==
Commercial vacuum trucks which collect fecal sludge usually have a volume of 10–55 cubic metres (350–1,940 cu ft). However various smaller versions for specialized applications or low-resource settings can be found with tanks as small as 500 litres (110 imp gal; 130 US gal).

=== Pumps ===
They generally use a low-volume sliding vane pump or a liquid ring pump to create a negative air pressure. The use of diaphragm mud pumps is less common, but with the advantage of a simpler design and usually lower overall costs. The disadvantage is that mechanical parts come into contact with the sludge, which is not the case for the more common vacuum pumps.

The truck can be configured to be a direct belt drive, or a hydraulic drive system.

There are two different ways to mount the pump: either directly on the truck with the vacuum drive powered by the truck motor, or on the trailer with an independent motor. The second option with the independent motor is more complicated and not commonly used. It has the advantage of potentially having the pump closer to the septic tank. It is also able to use the negative pressure suction side of the pump as well as the positive pressure side to pump sludge over longer distances or lift it higher into the tank.

=== Suction hoses ===
The suction hoses are typically 2 to 4 inches (5.1 to 10.2 cm) in diameter with 3 inches (7.6 cm) being the norm. The possible length depends on various factors mainly related to the lift and other pressure losses. It is usually impossible to extend it beyond 50 metres (160 ft).

An inherent suction limitation of all suction pumps is that they can only lift a liquid through utilizing atmospheric pressure. For pure water the theoretical maximum lift is approximately 10.3 metres (34 ft). However, due to the viscosity of fecal sludge it is possible to mix air into it either by sucking close from the surface or by adding air with a compressor through a separate hose. Through this process, the overall density of the sludge/air mixture can be reduced below that of pure water and thus a higher lift (10–15 metres (33–49 ft)) can be reached under optimal conditions. Other factors affecting the possible lift and total length of the suction hose are that single stage vacuum pumps only reach an 85-90% partial vacuum, and that small air leakages, pipe friction losses, and the viscosity of the liquid further reduce the possible lift.

=== Emptying the tanker ===
Normally a tanker is emptied by gravity. It is possible to pressurize the vacuum tank to "pressure out" the liquid quicker (or against a small difference in elevation). This procedure is detrimental for the equipment, hence is used in special situations.

The regular discharge time for a tanker of 8–9 cubic metres (280–320 cu ft) is about 15 minutes (or 7–10 minutes to unload a tanker of 4,000 litres (880 imp gal; 1,100 US gal)). The outlet is typically 4 to 6 inches (10 to 15 cm) in diameter. The discharge time depends on the thickness of the sludge, the size of the outlet valve and hose, the amount of garbage in the fecal sludge, and the frequency of driver cleaning the dump screen.

== Uses ==
Vacuum trucks are used by town and municipal governments, as well as commercial entities around the world.

=== Human excreta ===
Several types of non-centralized sanitation systems are served by vacuum trucks. They are used to empty septage from cesspits, septic tanks, pit latrines, and communal latrines, for street cleanup, for sewer clean out, and for individual septic systems. The trucks are used in the cleaning of sanitary sewer pumping stations. Vacuum trucks are used to empty portable toilets. In commercial aviation, vacuum trucks are used to collect waste from airplane toilets.

Vacuum trucks discharge these wastes to the sewer network, to a wastewater treatment plant, or—usually illegally, for example in many developing countries— directly into the environment. The latter practice, called "institutionalised open defecation", is dangerous since it constitutes a public health and environmental hazard.

=== Industrial liquids ===
Vacuum trucks are used in the petroleum industry, for cleaning of storage tanks and spills. They are also an important part of drilling oil and natural gas wells, as they are located at the drilling site. Vacuum trucks are used to remove drilling mud, drilling cuttings, cement, spills, and for removal of brine water from production tanks. They dispose of this in sump pits, treatment plants or if within safe levels may be spread in farm fields.

=== Others ===
Vacuum trucks are also used for exposing underground utilities. Before installing many pieces of underground equipment, the ground must be excavated far enough down to create a solid foundation for the structure to be placed on. Underground utilities can include lamp poles, traffic lights, road signs, and even commercial grade trees for landscaping.

To prepare the ground for installation it is jetted with water, and the vacuum truck sucks up the muddy product. This exposes the buried utility without the possibility of damage, as would be possible if a digging machine were used (i.e. tractor backhoe, tracked or wheeled excavator, ditch witches).

Vacuum trucks can also be used for cleanup of contaminated soil. For some instances, air excavation may be used in place of hydro excavation. Air excavation, also known as soft dig, uses compressed air to break up the ground and then vacuums up the soil into the debris tank. Air excavation is often used for locating underground electrical cables and gas lines.

== See also ==
- Gong farmer
- Gully emptier
- Suction excavator
