= Closet (album) =

CLOSET

Studio album by Yoh Kamiyama
- Released: April 27, 2022
- Genre: J-Pop
- Language: Japanese
- Label: Sony Music Entertainment Japan

Yoh Kamiyama chronology
Yumemiru Kodomo (2020)	CLOSET (2022)

Closet (クローゼット) (stylized in allcaps) is Yoh Kamiyama's first full studio album, released by Sony Music Entertainment Japan on April 27, 2022.

== Background ==
Closet is the first release after three years since previous release Yumemiru Kodomo and the first full album release.

== Release ==
Among released tracks, "Seventeen" which is previously released on March 9, 2022. "Gunjō" and "Irokousui" as the debut singles are will be among the tracks too. Re-recorded version of "Yellow", "Aoitoge", and "Cut" are also included. A photobook is available with the limited version.

== Track listing ==
No.	Title	Length
1.	"YELLOW - CLOSET ver. -"	2:58
2.	"セブンティーン (Seventeen)"	2:48
3.	"色香水 (Irokousui)"	4:11
4.	"Girl."	3:25
5.	"青い棘 (Aoitoge) - CLOSET ver. -"	4:00
6.	"煙 (Kemuri)"	2:32
7.	"O (until death) YOU"	1:50
8.	"群青 (Gunjō)"	4:06
9.	"仮面 (Kamen)"	3:38
10.	"CUT - CLOSET ver. -"	3:07
11.	"SHELTER"	3:08
12.	"Laundry"	4:17
13.	"CLOSET"	2:41
Total length:		42:43

== Tie-up ==
群青 (Gunjō)

2020 anime Drifting Dragons opening theme song.

色香水 (Irokousui)

2021 anime Horimiya opening theme song.

仮面 (Kamen)

2021 TELASA original drama, 僕らが殺した、最愛のキミ (We Killed You, Beloved You) theme song.
