= Rodding =

Rodding may refer to:

- Use of drain rods
- The town of Rødding in Denmark
- Operating hot rods
- The rodding cryptanalysis technique developed by Dilly Knox
