= Gully emptier =

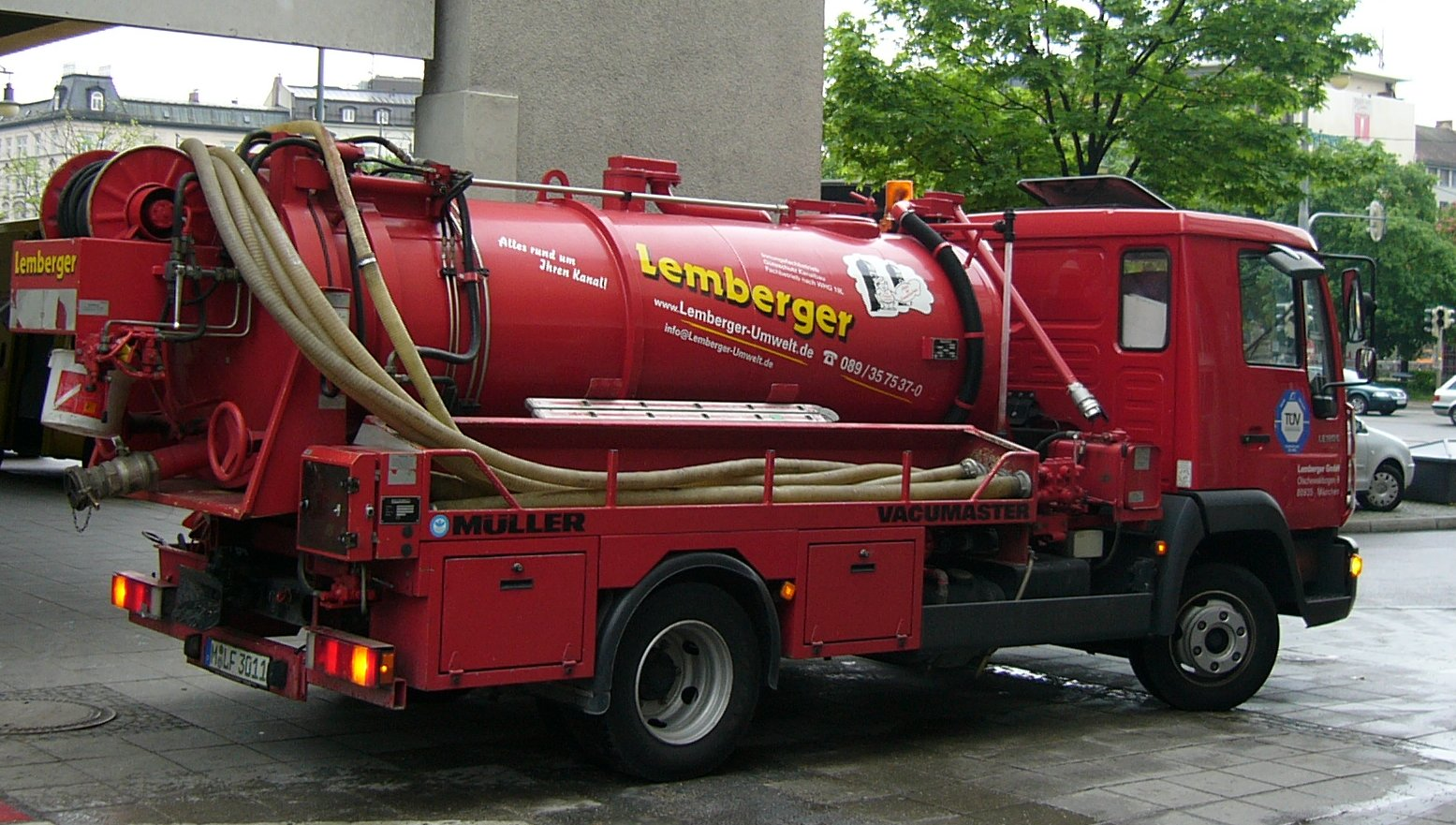
Gully emptier in Germany

A gully emptier (colloquially: "gully sucker") is a type of specialized tank truck with suction gear which can suck wastewater and mud and sludge out of hollows such as the hollows below drain grids in street gutters and carry it to a suitable disposal point. It needs to be able to suck out and pump through into its tank any road grit and miscellaneous solids that have entered the hollow.

Some have a means of squeezing the water from its load, and letting that water into the drain or keeping it for high pressure cleaning of drain pipes.

== Suction excavator ==
Similar to a gully emptier but with a wider suction hose and a more powerful suction, a suction excavator is used to expose or remove ground material, particularly in locations where conventional mechanical digging could damage underground infrastructure such as pipes or cables.

== Differences from a vacuum truck ==
A vehicle which is purely a vacuum truck has a long wide flexible hose without the big solid nozzle with controls on.

Gully emptiers are often outfitted with devices to separate the liquid content of its tank from solid matter, allowing the liquids to run to storm drain. Since this is not done with cesspool content, cesspool emptiers have no need for such separative capability.

Sometimes a gully emptier has a flexible hose without solid nozzle like on a cesspool emptier.

== Images ==
Gully emptiers in Greater Manchester

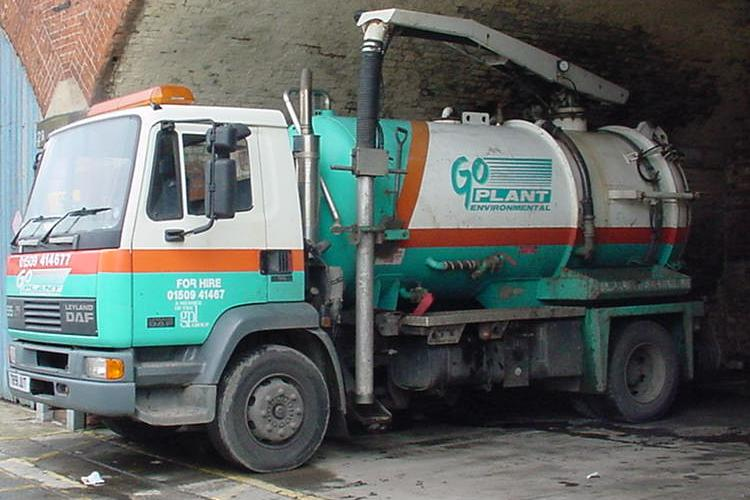
A gully emptier in Manchester

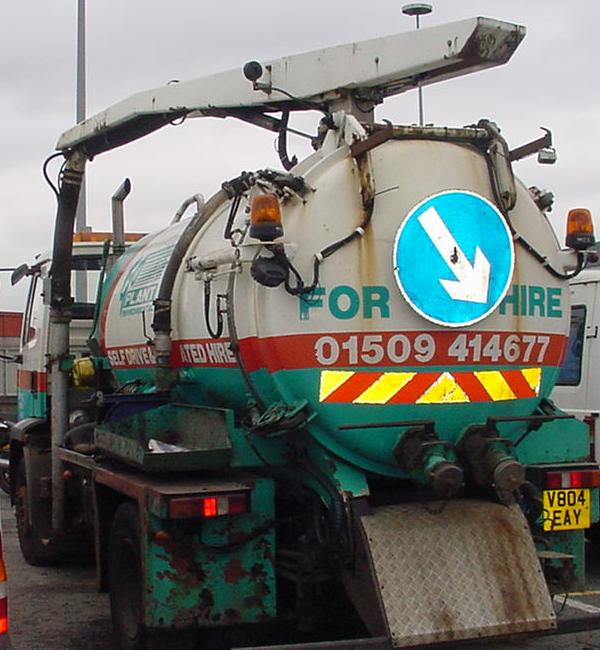
A gully emptier in Manchester, rear view

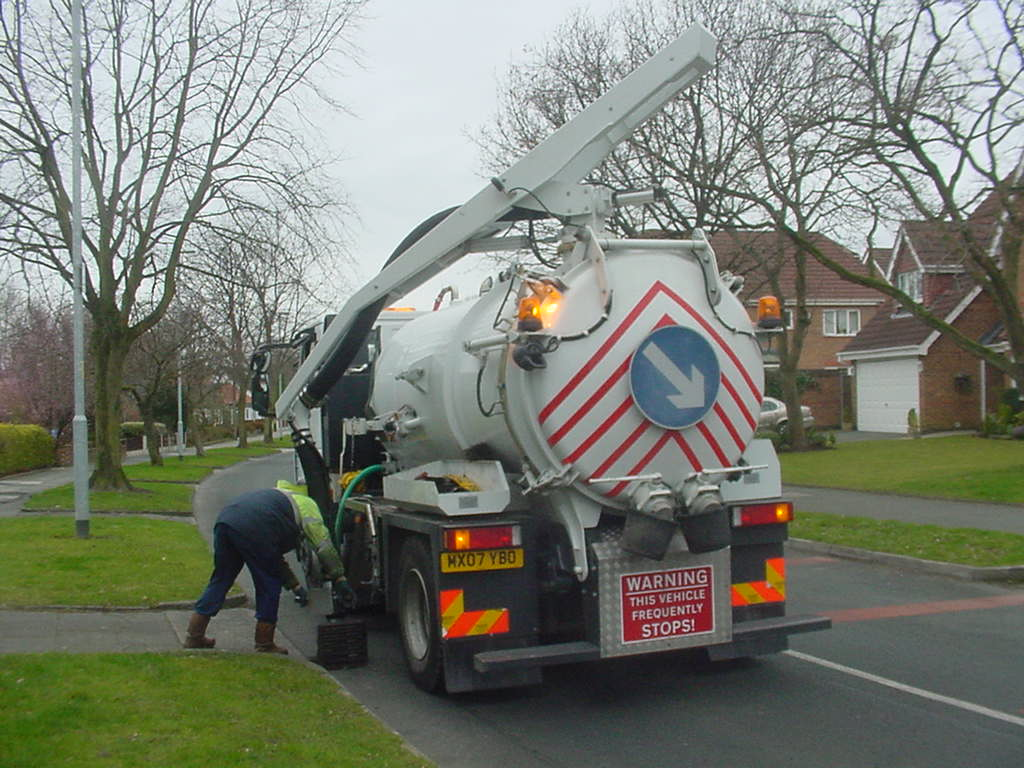
A gully emptier in street in Manchester, March 2008

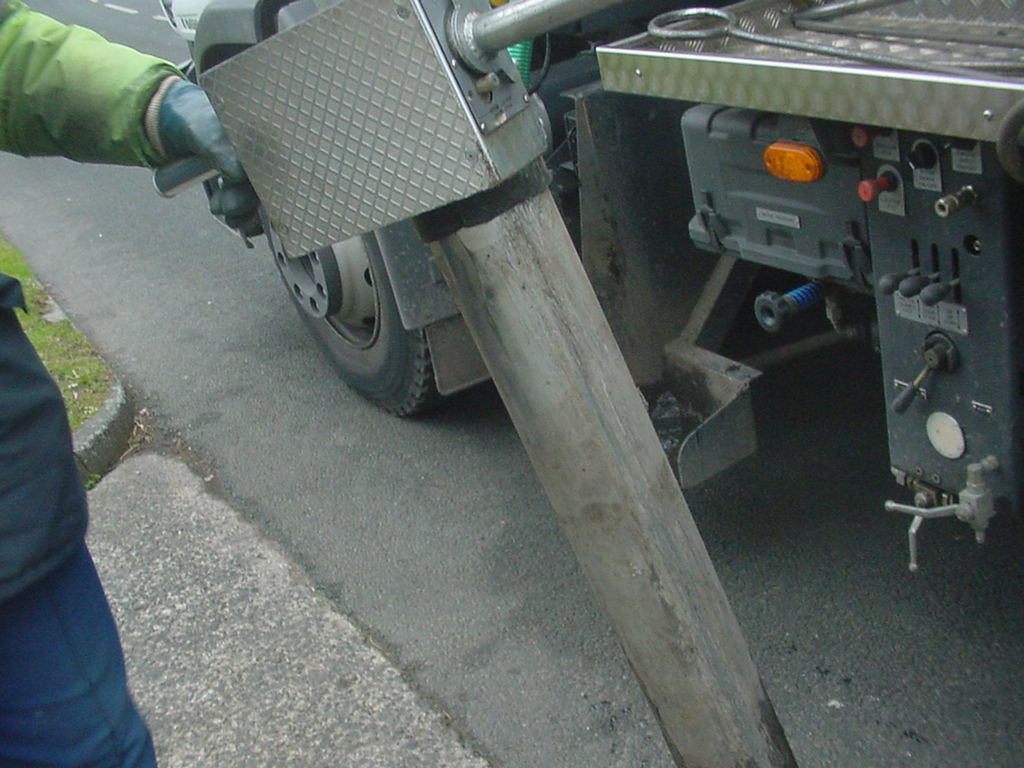
A gully emptier in street in Manchester, March 2008. Close-up of controls

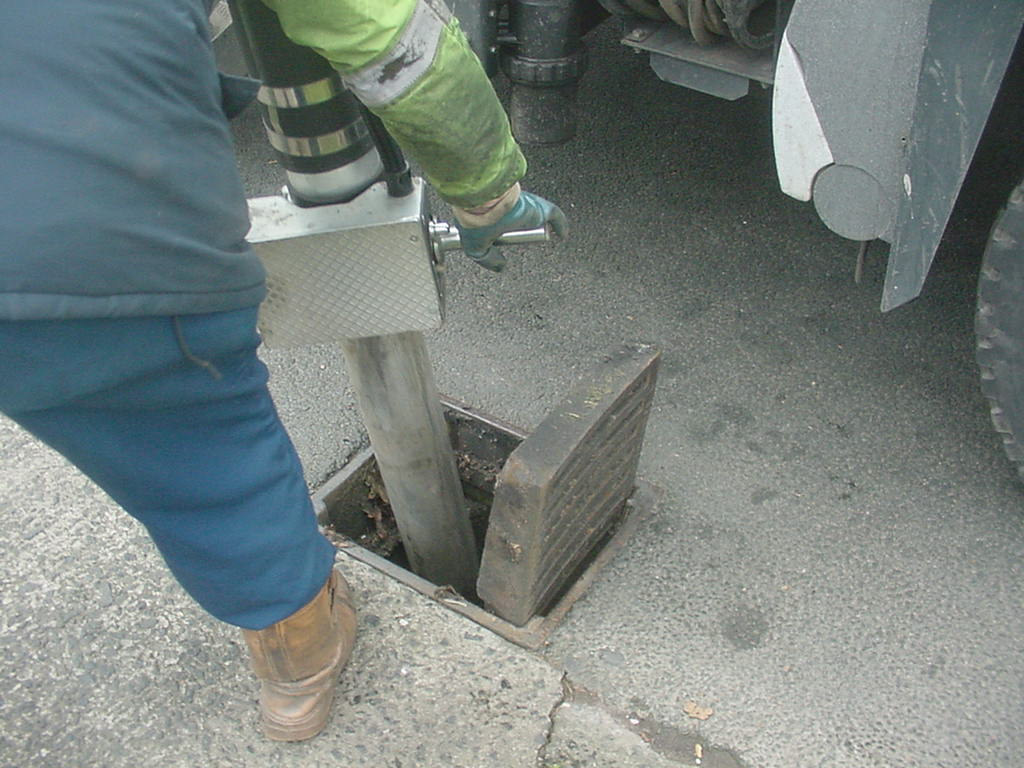
A gully emptier in street in Manchester, March 2008. Sucking a drain gully out

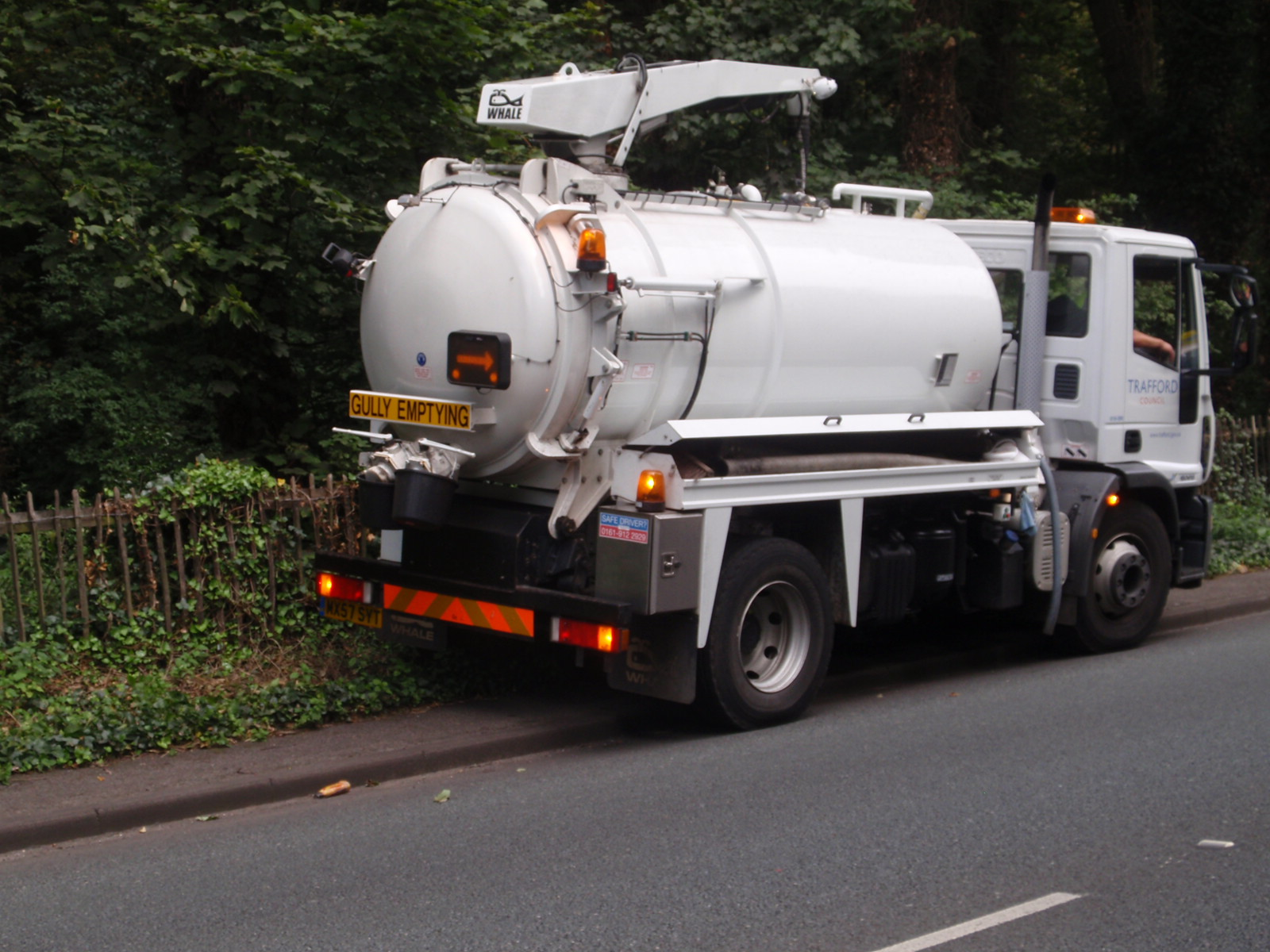
Gully emptier, A556, Bowdon, Greater Manchester

== See also ==
- Suction excavator
