= John Netten Radcliffe =

English epidemiologist

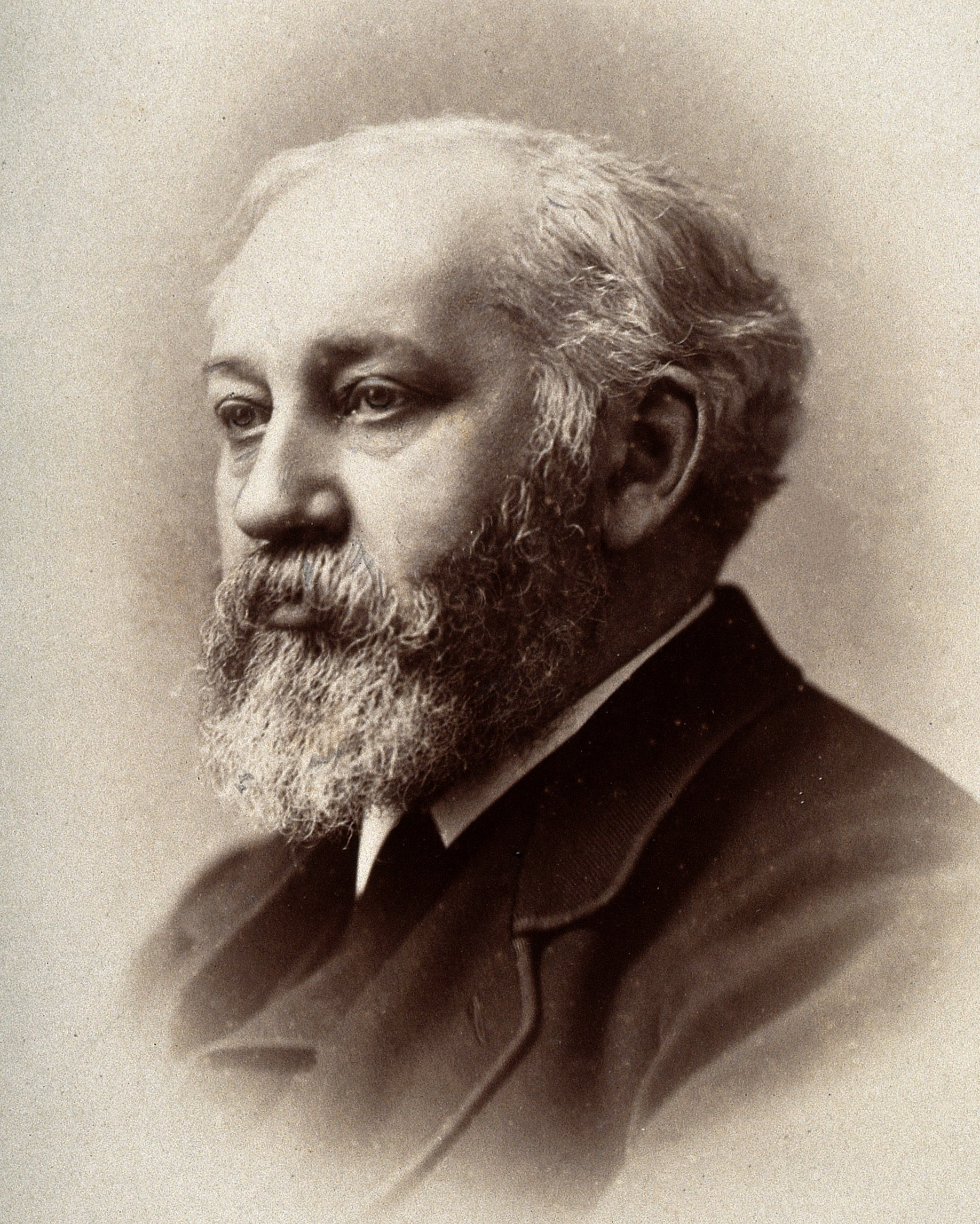
John Netten Radcliffe in 1881

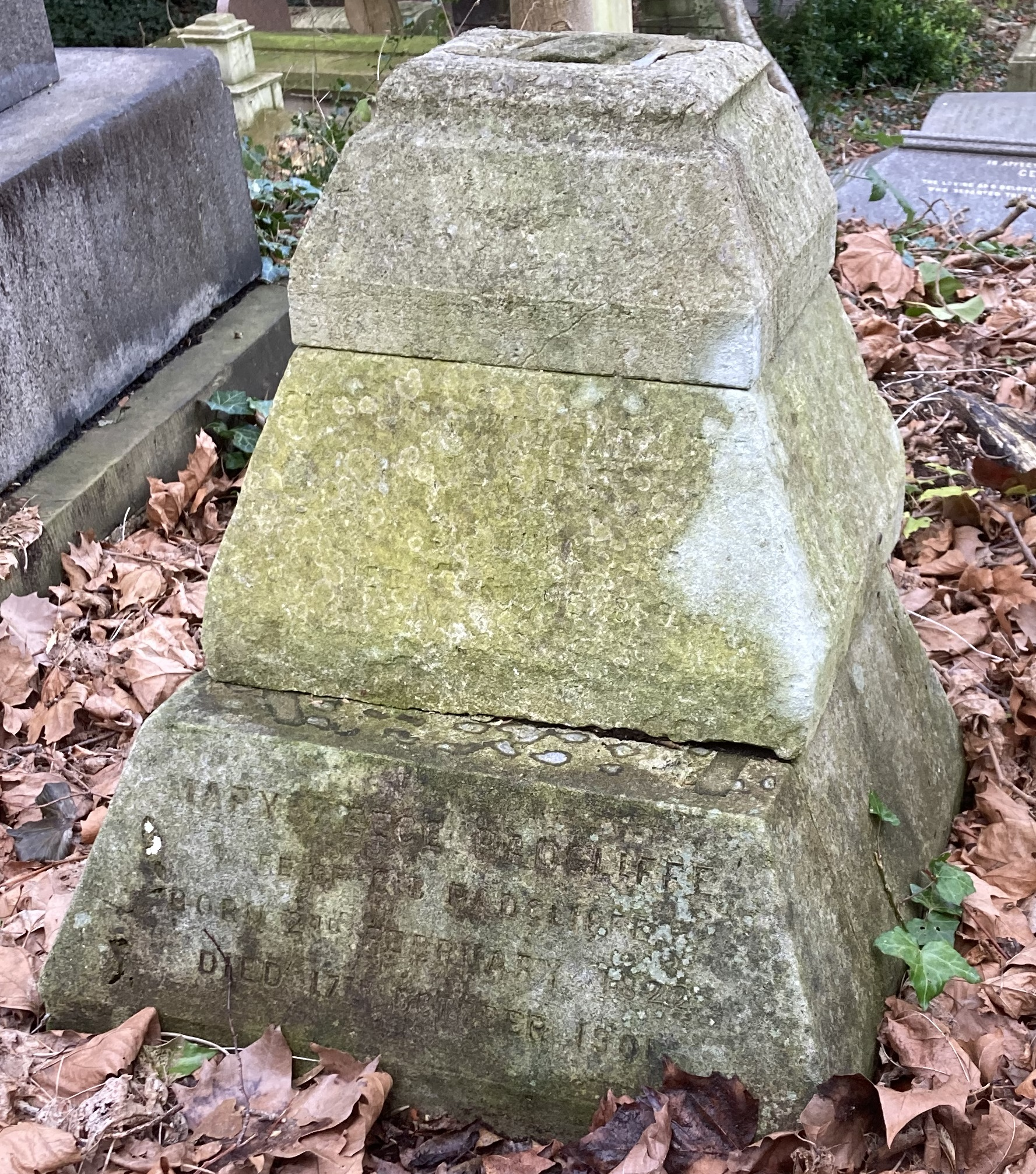
Radcliffe family grave in Highgate Cemetery

John Netten Radcliffe (20 April 1826 – 11 September 1884) was an English epidemiologist.

== Life ==
The son of Charles Radcliffe, and younger brother of Dr. Charles Bland Radcliffe, he was born in Yorkshire and received his early medical training at the Leeds school of medicine. Shortly after obtaining his diploma he went to the Crimea as a surgeon attached to the headquarters of Omar Pasha, and remained there till the close of the war. He received for his services the Order of the Medjidie as well as the Turkish and English medals, with a clasp for Sebastopol. On returning home he became medical superintendent of the Hospital for the Paralysed and Epileptic in Queen Square, London.

In 1865 Radcliffe was asked to prepare a report on the appearance of cholera abroad, and in 1866 he was engaged in investigating the outbreak in East London, which he traced to the infected supply of the East London Water Company. This report appeared as a blue-book in 1867, and gained Radcliffe a reputation. He was elected a member of the Epidemiological Society in 1850, was its honorary secretary 1862–1871, and president 1875–1877. In November 1869 he was appointed to the second of the two public health inspectorships then created by the privy council, and, on the formation of the local government board in 1871, he was made assistant medical officer. In poor health, he resigned the post in 1883.

He died on 11 September 1884 and was buried on the western side of Highgate Cemetery.

== Works ==
Radcliffe, before his official appointment, wrote:

- The Pestilence in England, London, 1852.
- Fiends, Ghosts, and Sprites, London, 1854.
- The Hygiene of the Turkish Army, London, 1858; reprinted with additions from the Sanitary Review.

In his official capacity Radcliffe prepared reports dealing with epidemics and quarantine. These included:

- On the Means for preventing Excrement Nuisances in Towns and Villages, 1869 and 1873.
- On an Outbreak of Enteric Fever in Marylebone, 1873.
- On the Diffusion of Cholera in Europe during the ten years 1865–74.
- On the Progress of Levantine Plague, 1875–77.

== Notes ==
Attribution

This article incorporates text from a publication now in the public domain: Woodward, Bernard Barham (1896). "Radcliffe, John Netten". In Lee, Sidney (ed.). Dictionary of National Biography. Vol. 47. London: Smith, Elder & Co. pp. 132–133.
