= Suction excavator =

Soft excavation technique applied in loosen soils and uncompacted sediments

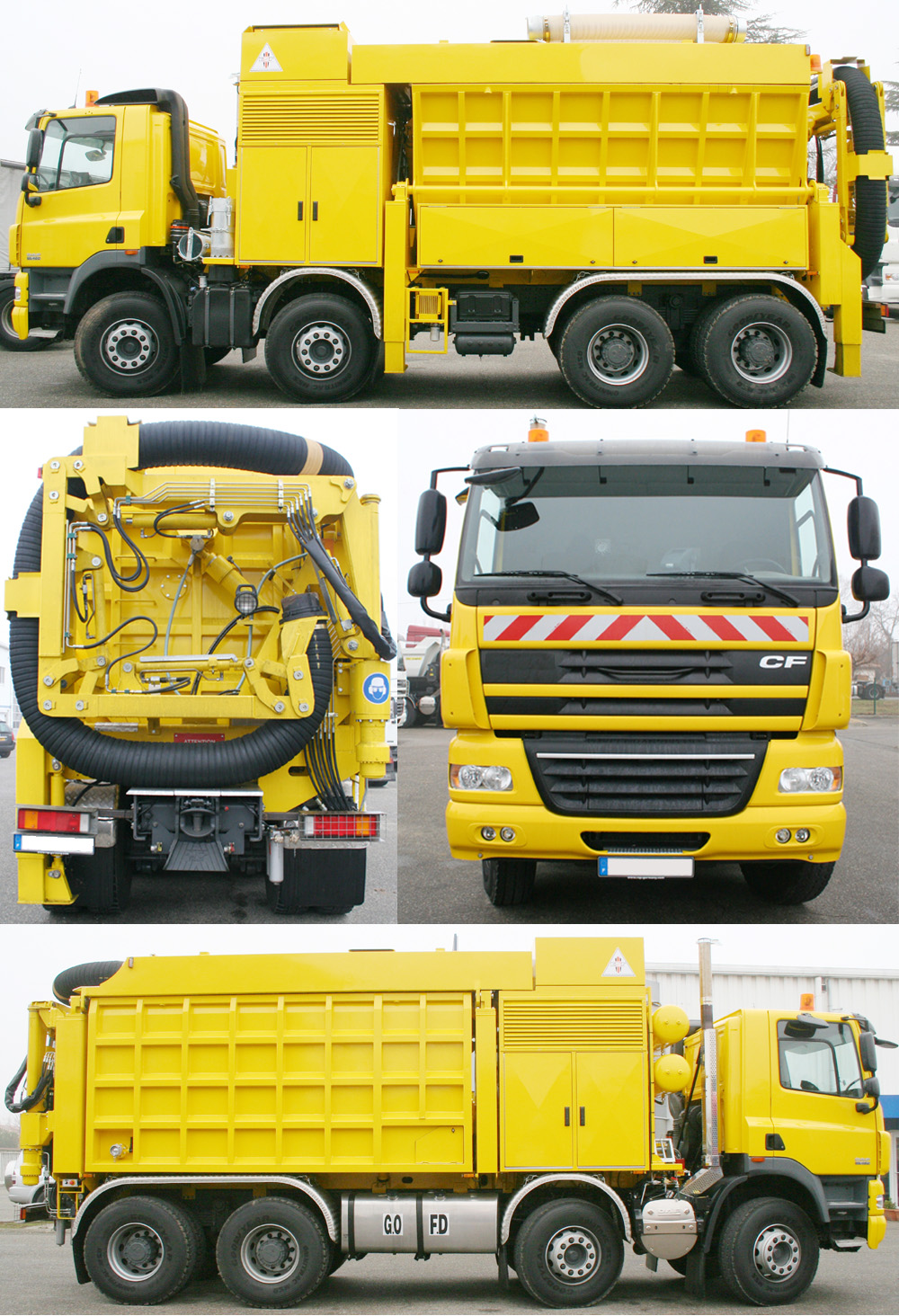
Four views of a typical suction excavator

A vacuum excavator, or suction excavator, is a construction vehicle that removes material through a hose into a holding tank using one of two methods.

Airflow suction excavators use air turbines to create a constant airflow. This results in a constant (and equal) rate of airflow, from the tank being empty to full. Due to the need for constant airflow, the end of the hose can typically not be covered entirely by debris or fully submerged in liquids (such as water). Liquids are therefore typically extracted by hovering the end of the hose above the water.

Pressurised pump suction excavators create a high-pressure environment within their holding tank using air turbines. Upon the opening of a valve, a strong vacuum is created at the end of the hose, where material can be sucked up and into the tank. However, vacuum-power diminishes as the tank gets filled.

For those reasons, both types of suction excavator have their own individual use cases where one may work better than the other. For that reason, many companies operate a mixed fleet.

The global market size for suction excavators was estimated to be valued at US$924.7 million in 2020.

Suction excavators are meant to be less destructive than regular excavators.

== Use within different industries ==
- Ground excavation and daylighting around buries utilities
- Arboriculture (specifically, tree root exposure)
- Railway ballast removal and re-institution

== Method ==
=== Ground excavation ===
Suction excavators are most commonly used for removing earth around buried utilities and tree roots. This process is sometimes referred to as daylighting, as the underground utilities are exposed to daylight during the process.

For suction excavation to work best, ground should ideally be loose. Gravel, Sand, Loam and MOT type 1 stone are typically the least time-intensive materials to 'vac' or 'suck' due to them being soft and loose. Clay is typically more difficult due to its 'claggy' nature

Suction excavators are commonly used alongside one (or both) of the following pieces of equipment for this purpose:

- Air lance
- High pressure water jetter

For 'air excavation', air lances are used. Air-lances are pieces of equipment that typically include three basic components: a long shaft, a trigger, and a compressor coupling. The principle is simple: use the Compressor air to 'blast' and 'break up' earth into smaller pieces that can be sucked up by the excavator.

Hydro excavation is a method of suction excavation where a High pressure water jetter is used to cut the ground into smaller sections that can be sucked up.

== History ==
Since 1993, RSP GmbH (Germany) has produced suction structures mounted onto two, three, and four-axle vehicles, stationary suction units, and custom-made machines. Pacific Tek, also founded in 1993, has created the Angled Vacuum Excavator Tank (1997) and the 180° Swivel Mount Valve Operator (1999).

In 1998, the Mobile Tiefbau Saugsysteme (Germany) produced another type of suction excavator.

== Uses ==
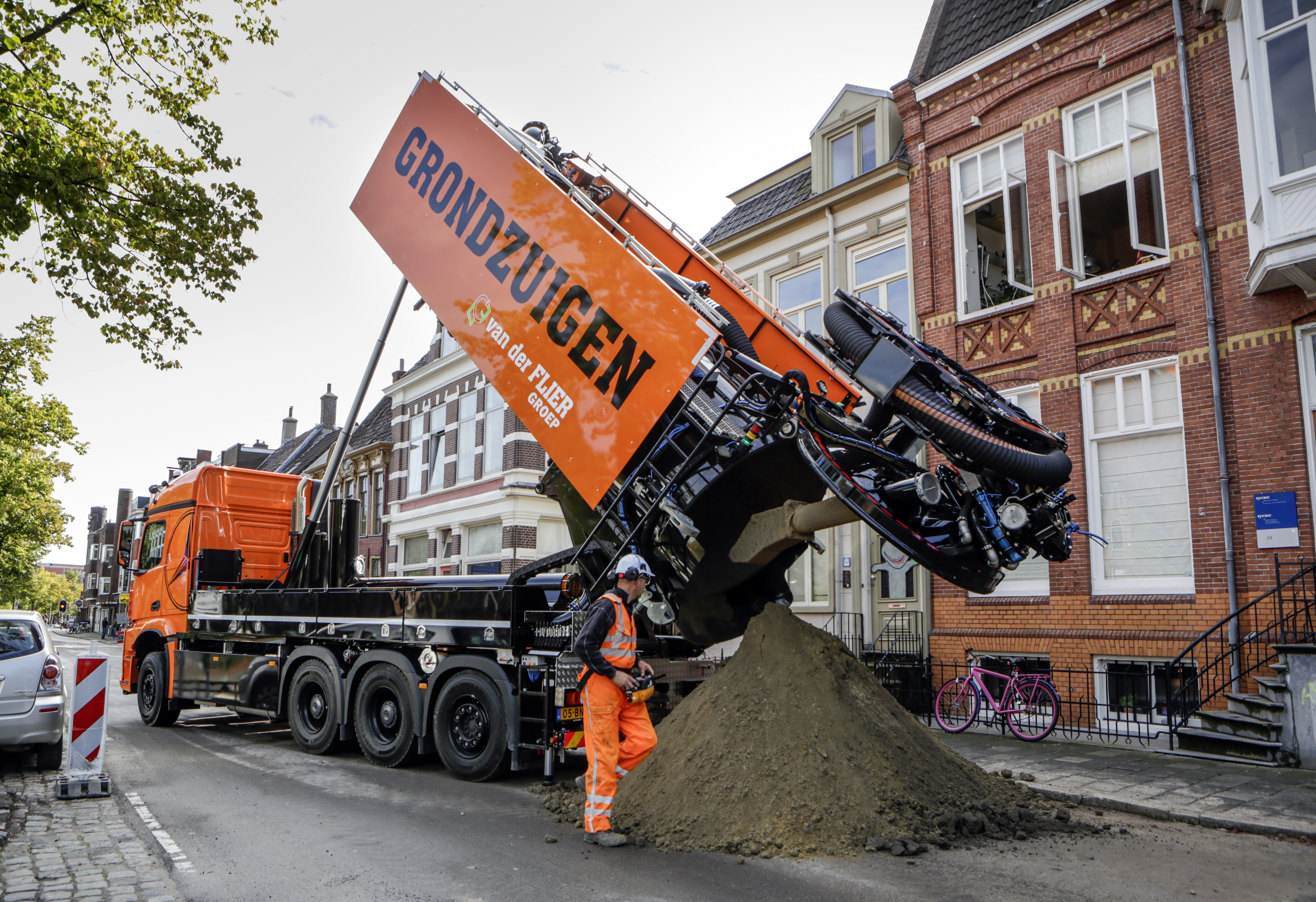
A suction excavator with vacuum excavation equipment operating in the Netherlands

Depending on the machine used and soil conditions, a 12-inch-square, 5-foot-deep pothole can be completed in 20 minutes or less. Suction excavation is sometimes used in conjunction with conventional underground (one-call) locating services. Because of overlapping buried utility lines, locating devices often miss some of the buried utilities on a site and cannot completely or accurately mark a site.

According to New Mexico 811's (NM811) Aligning Change, Locating with Potholing, "One-call paint marks and flags are the first steps in making the process of locating underground utilities safer, the use of suction excavation technology adds an additional margin of safety."

== See also ==
- Dredging
- Gully emptier
- Street sweeper
- Suction dredger, used for dredging underwater
- Suction (medicine)
