= The Closet =

The Closet may refer to:

- Closeted, a metaphor for LGBTQ people who have not disclosed their sexual orientation or gender identity
- The Closet (2001 film), French film
- The Closet (2007 film), Chinese film
- The Closet (2020 film), South Korean film

== See also ==
- Closet (disambiguation)
- In the closet (disambiguation)
