= Pail closet =

Room used to dispose of human excreta

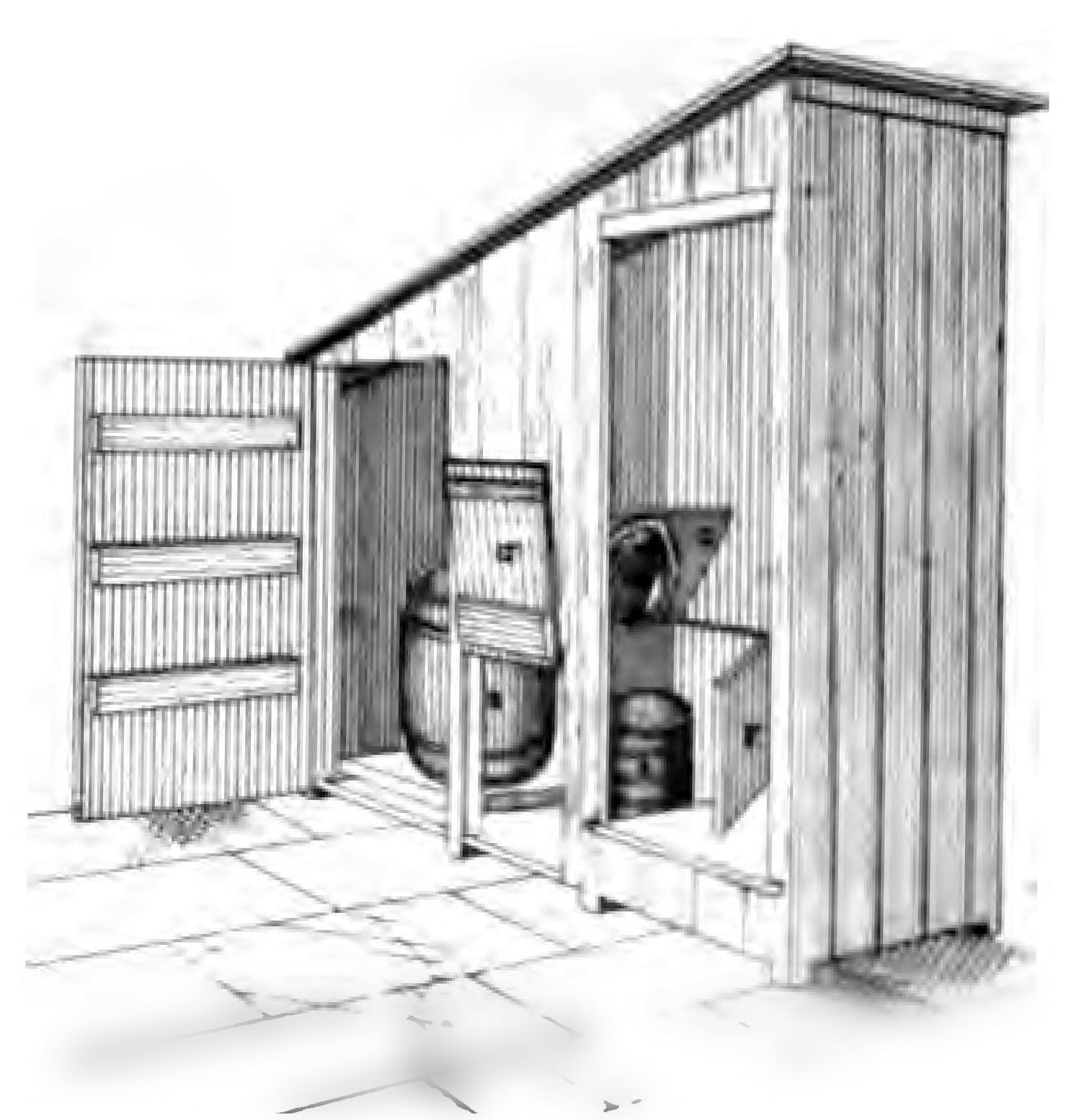
A Rochdale Corporation pail closet. The seated area is on the right. The chamber on the left was for the disposal of common household waste.

A pail closet or pail privy or dirt closet was a room used for the disposal of human excreta, under the "pail system" (or Rochdale system) of waste removal. The "closet" (a word which had long meant "toilet" in one usage) was a small outhouse (privy) which contained a seat, underneath which a portable receptacle was placed. This bucket (pail), into which the user would defecate, was removed and emptied by the local authority on a regular basis. The contents, known euphemistically as night soil, would either be incinerated or composted into fertiliser.

Although the more advanced water closet (flush toilet) was popular in wealthy homes, the lack of an adequate water supply and poor sewerage meant that in 19th-century England, in working-class neighbourhoods, towns and cities often chose dry conservancy methods of waste disposal. The pail closet was an evolution of the midden closet (privy midden), an impractical and unsanitary amenity considered a nuisance to public health. The pail system was popular in France and England, particularly in the historic Lancashire town of Rochdale, from which the system commonly took its name. The pail closet was not without its own problems; if the pail was not emptied on a regular basis, it overflowed and became unhygienic. Some manufacturers lined the pail with absorbent materials, and other designs used mixtures of dry earth or ash to disguise the smell.

Improved water supplies and sewerage systems in England led directly to the replacement of the pail closet during the early 20th century. Municipal collection of pail toilets (dunnies) continued in Australia into the second half of the twentieth century. In the western world, the pail closet has now been almost completely replaced by the flush toilet. However, similar systems still exist in less developed countries, and are discussed at sanitation.

== Before the pail closet ==
Pail closets were used to dispose of human excreta, dirty water, and general household waste such as kitchen refuse and sweepings. The pail closet system was one of several methods of waste disposal in common use in the 19th century, others of which were the privy midden system, the pail system, and the dry-earth system.

=== Middens ===
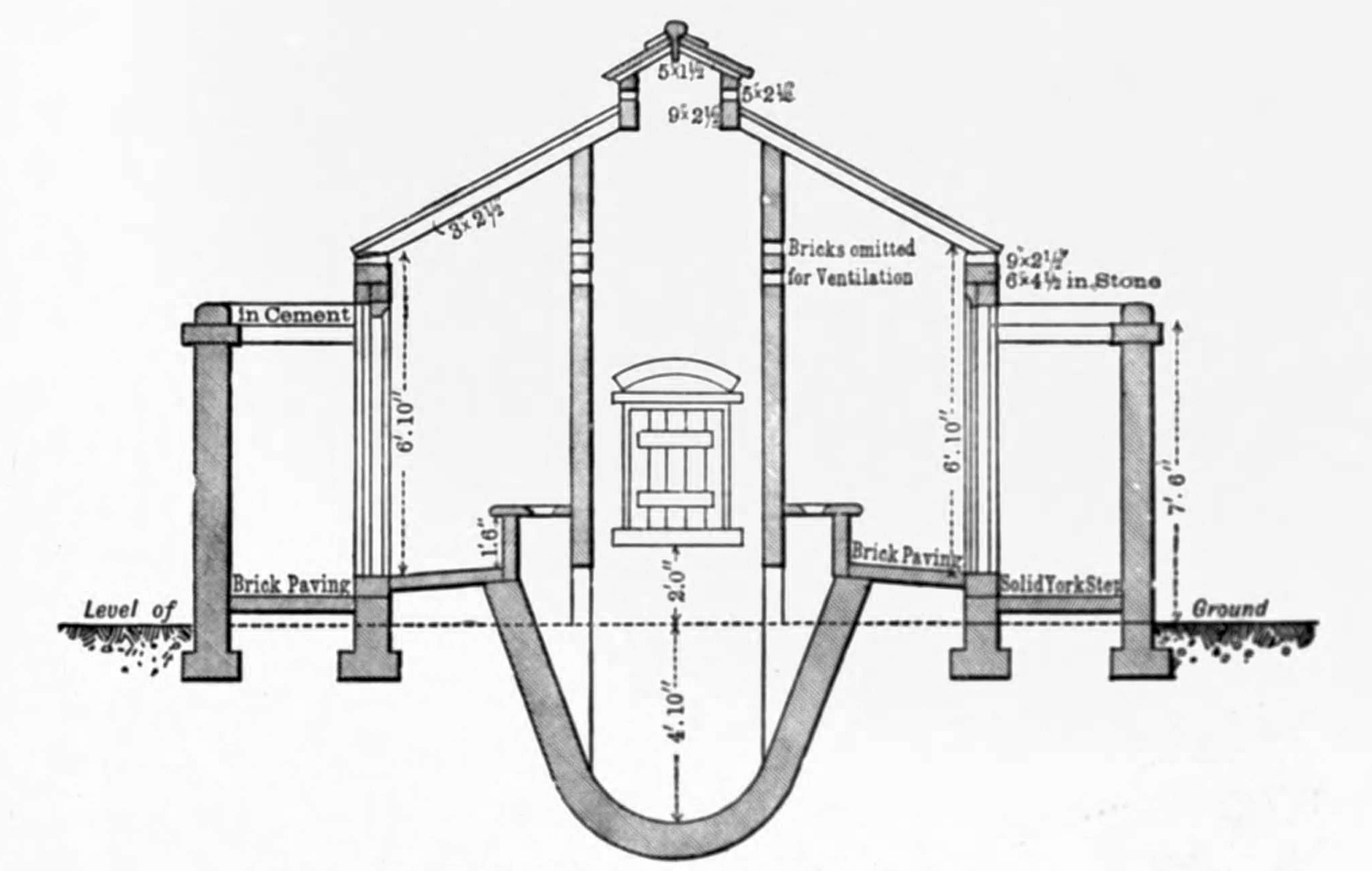
Diagram of a midden closet in Nottingham

By 1869, Manchester had a population of about 354,000 people who were served by about 10,000 water closets (flush toilets) and 38,000 middensteads. An investigation of the condition of the city's sewer network revealed that it was "choked up with an accumulation of solid filth, caused by overflow from the middens." (Middens and middensteads both refer to dunghills, ash pits, or refuse heaps.) Such problems forced the city authorities to consider other methods of dealing with human excretion. Although the water closet was used in wealthy homes, concerns over river pollution, costs and available water supplies meant that most towns and cities chose more labour-intensive dry conservancy systems. Manchester was one such city and by 1877 its authorities had replaced about 40,000 middens with pail and midden closets, rising to 60,000 by 1881. The soil surrounding the old middens was cleared out, connections with drains and sewers removed and dry closets erected over each site. A contemporary estimate stated that the installation of about 25,000 pail closets removed as much as 3,000,000 imperial gallons (14,000,000 L) of urine and accompanying faeces from the city's drains, sewers and rivers.

The midden closet was a development of the privy, which had evolved from the primitive "fosse" ditch. Midden closets were still used in the latter part of the 19th century but were rapidly falling out of favour. Gilbert Richard Redgrave, in a speech to the Institution of Civil Engineers in 1876, said that the midden closet represented "... the standard of all that is utterly wrong, constructed as it is of porous materials, and permitting free soakage of filth into the surrounding soil, capable of containing the entire dejections from a house, or from a block of houses, for months and even years". The 1868 Rivers Pollution Commission reported two years later: "privies and ashpits are continually to be seen full to overflowing and as filthy as can be... These middens are cleaned out whenever notice is given that they need it, probably once half-yearly on an average, by a staff of night-men with their attendant carts."

Midden closets were, therefore, generally insanitary and were also difficult to empty and clean. Later improvements, such as a midden closet built in Nottingham, used a brick-raised seat above a concave receptacle to direct excreta toward the centre of the pit—which was lined with cement to prevent leakage into the surrounding soil. This closet was also designed with a special opening through which deodorising material could be scattered over the top of the pit. A special ventilation shaft was also installed. The design offered a significant improvement over the less advanced midden privy, but the problems of emptying and cleaning such pits remained and thus the pail system, with its easily removable container, became more popular.

== Types ==
...the absorption appeared to me to be trivial in pails used by women and children. Widely different degrees of sloppiness existed, obviously dependent upon differences in the families using the pails; but the extent of sloppiness noticed in Salford, in 1869, was rarely observed in Halifax, greater care being apparently taken in the latter town to avoid the emptying of chamber utensils into the pails. Probably the more regular locking of the doors of the closets, which is practiced in Halifax, contributes not a little to the exclusion of the contents of chamber utensils from the pails, less trouble being experienced in casting them into the yard drain. At any rate the aspect of the lined pails in use in Halifax generally, was less offensive to the eye than that of the simple pail, and the casting down of a portion of the lining, as I noticed in several instances, sufficed effectually to hide the offense and diminish the odor from the pail.

— John Netten Radcliffe (May 1874), commenting on the use of the Goux system in Halifax

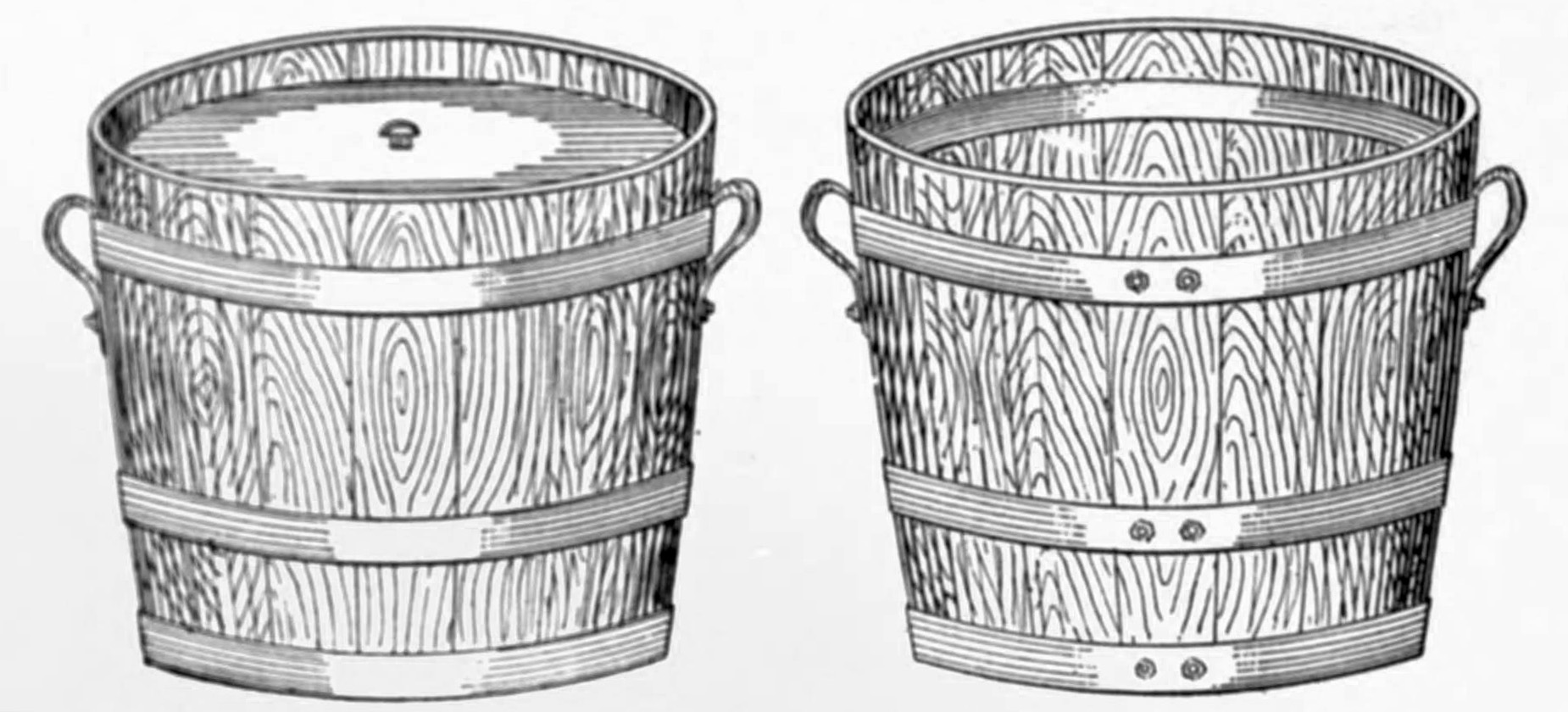
A full pail, complete with lid (left), and an empty pail, ready to be returned. These are Rochdale pails, made from wood. Manchester's pails were made from galvanised iron, with India-rubber beading around the lids to seal them.

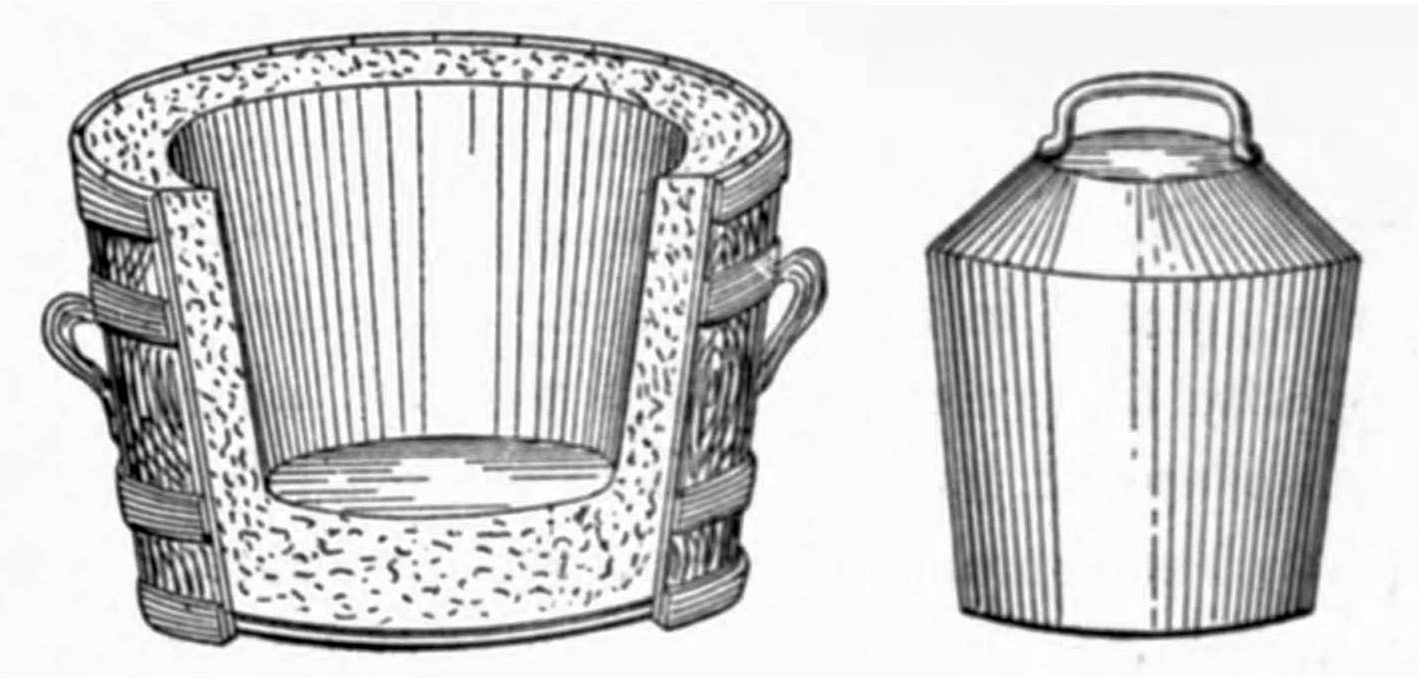
Cutaway section of a Goux pail, with mould

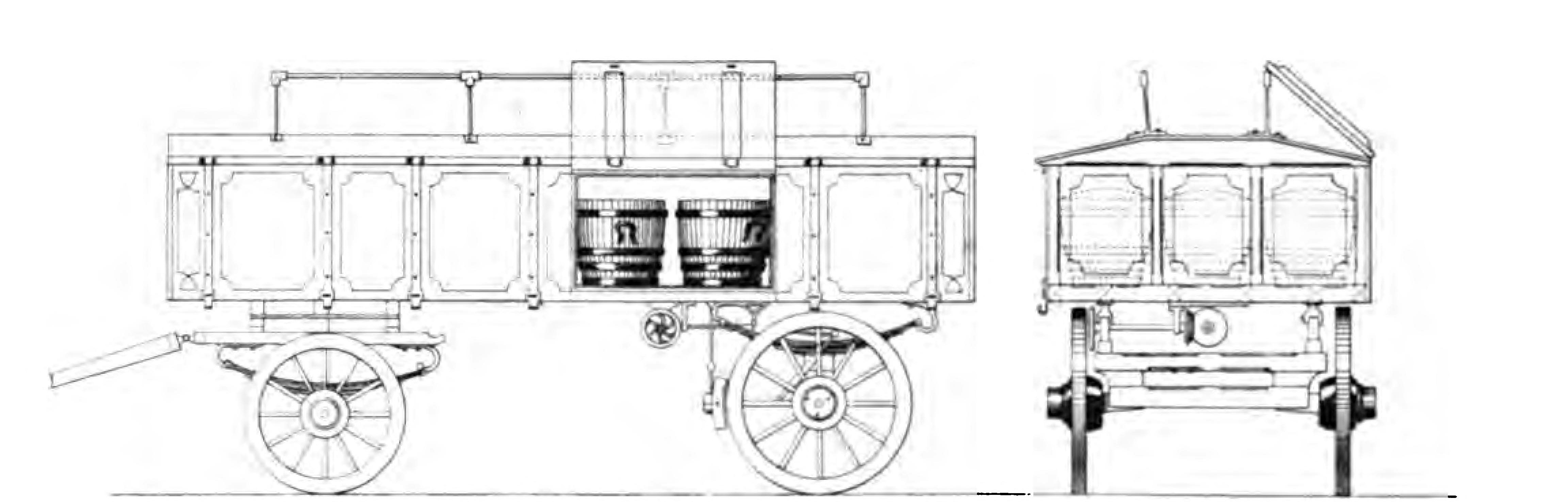
A wagon used to transport night soil

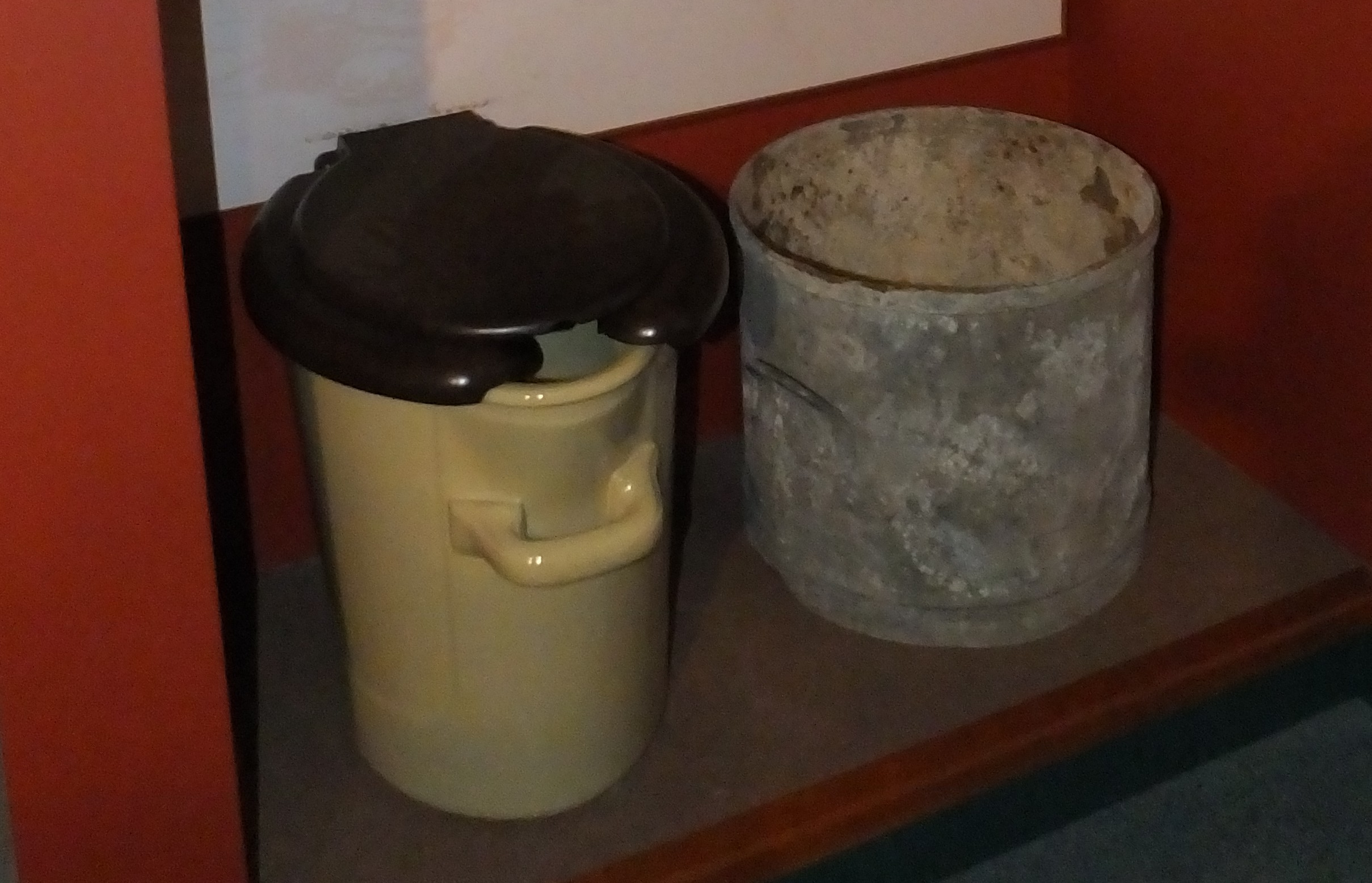
Industrially produced "sanitary ware", now in the Gladstone Pottery Museum

=== The Rochdale system ===
The Rochdale system was first used in 1869. It used a wooden tub, or pail (sometimes half of a petroleum barrel), which was placed under the closet seat. The pails were often circular (to aid cleaning), and were designed to be easily handled and of a size that encouraged regular collections. The top of the pail carried a cast iron rim about 3 inches deep to receive a tight-fitting inner lid. The pails were collected on a weekly basis during the day. Each pail was secured by its lid and loaded onto a sealed 24-bay wagon to be taken to a depot where they were emptied, cleaned and returned. While the pail was removed from the closet, a replacement was installed in its place. In 1874, Rochdale Corporation employed five such wagons in full-time service, collecting from 3,354 privies spread across the town. By contrast, with a much larger population, Manchester Corporation employed 73 wagons. By 1875, 4,741 pails were in use, and in 1876 the number was 5,566. A separate cart accompanied the wagon to collect other household refuse which was collected from a separate chamber in the pail closet.

About 9,000 long tons (9,100 t) of night soil were collected in Rochdale each year, from a population of about 64,000—roughly 313 lb (142 kg) per person. At the depot, the night soil was emptied into a storage tank. The pails were washed in a large trough using a mixture of chloride of lime and water. The night soil was then dried in revolving cylinders, using furnace heat from other borough refuse, before being transferred to so-called drying plates. Gases were burnt in a furnace, the fumes escaping up a 250-foot (76 m) chimney. Clinker from the remains of burnt refuse was used to make mortar. The manure works was a filthy environment, filled with dust. Enginemen were paid 7¼d, firemen 6½d, and general labourers 4½d. The fertiliser was transported from the works via railway to local filtration plots for disposal.

Some pails were supplied with deodorants such as iron sulphate. Manchester Corporation attempted to remove the smell of putrefaction by attaching cinder-sifters to their closets so that fine ash could be poured on top of the excrement. The Goux system, invented in the 1860s by Pierre Nicholas Goux, a landowner near Paris, and widely used in France, overcame some of the more common problems associated with pail closets by lining the pail with an absorbent material. The Rochdale Corporation experimented with Goux's design for several months but settled instead on a system which used smaller pails. Goux's system did, however, find a home in Halifax, where it was used in more than 3,000 closets after 1870. The wooden pails used in Halifax were oval in cross-section (about 24 by 19 inches) and 16 inches deep. Each was lined at the sides and bottom with a mixture of refuse, such as straw, grass, street sweepings, wool, hair, and even seaweed. This lining, which was formed by a special mould and to which sulphate of lime was added, was designed to help remove the smell of urine, slow putrefaction and keep the excreta dry. Pails were collected between 7 am and 5:30 pm. Members of the public occasionally complained about the smell, which usually occurred when a pail was left to overflow, such as in winter 1875 when severe weather conditions prevented the horse-pulled collection wagons from reaching the closets.

=== Earth closet system ===
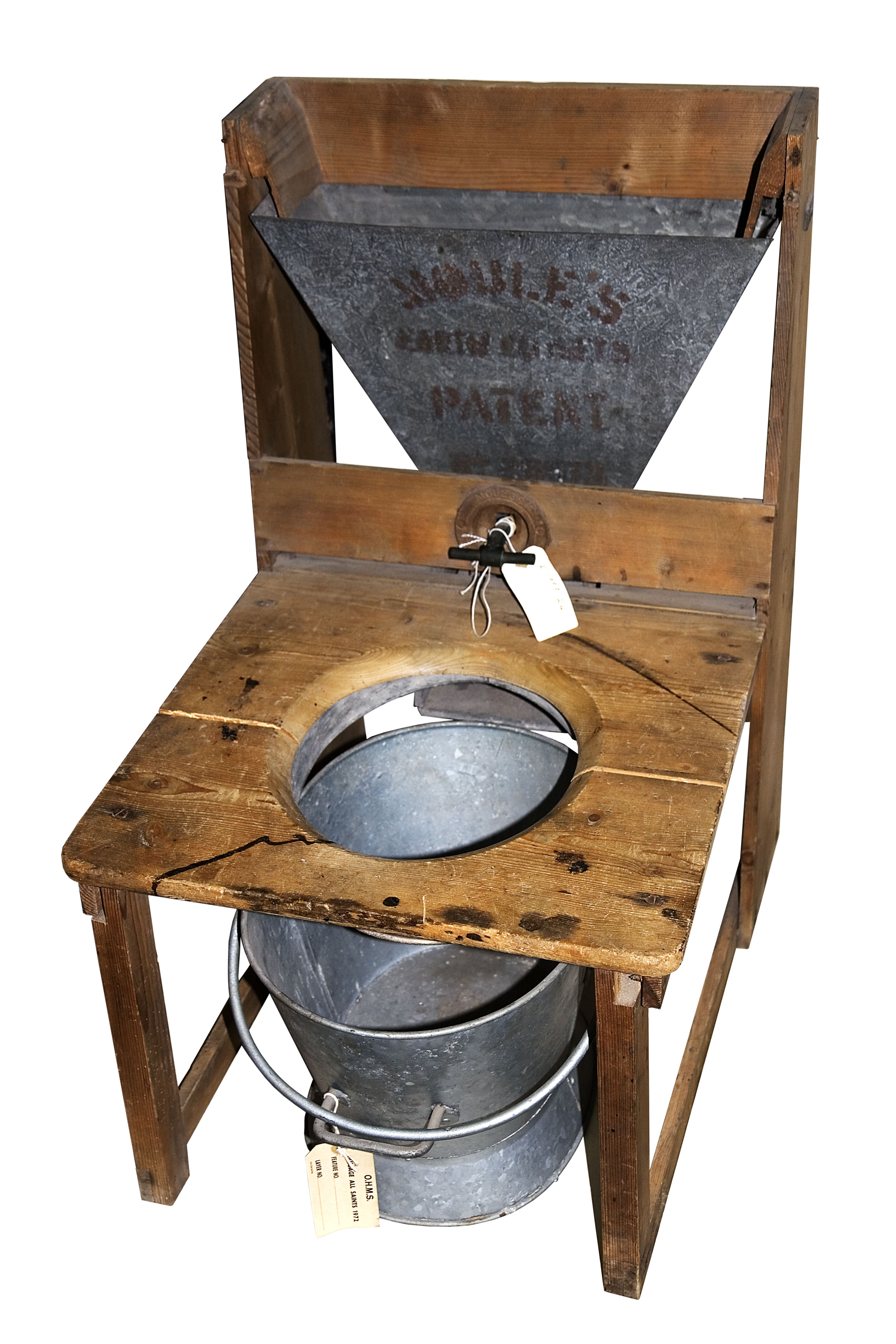
Henry Moule's dry earth closet. This example is from around 1875.

In some areas, an earth closet was used. Invented by Henry Moule, this system used a metal container as with the pail system, but small amounts of a mixture of peat, dry earth and ashes were used to cover the excreta, removing any smells almost immediately. These deodorisers were often applied with a small scoop or shovel, but more elaborate systems existed where the powder was kept in a box near the seat, with a small handle to control the amount deposited on the excrement. Charcoal—which could be obtained cheaply from street-sweepings—and sawdust were also used to good effect. The process was more expensive than the simpler pail system. The mixture of earth and excreta could often be dried and re-used, but the fear of infections meant that it was sometimes used instead as a garden fertiliser.

Earth closets were usually housed in a separate building from the main structure and were well ventilated. As with the pail system, earth closet containers were designed to be emptied frequently. The earth closet was popular and was used in private houses, military camps, hospitals and extensively in India. It remained in use well into the 1930s.

== Disadvantages ==
From a sanitary perspective, the pail system of waste removal was imperfect. Excreta and other general waste were often left above ground for hours, sometimes even days at a time. In his report on the Goux system used in Salford, the epidemiologist John Netten Radcliffe commented: "In every instance where a pail had been in use over two or three days, the capacity of absorption of the liquid dejections, claimed by the patentee for the absorbent material, had been exceeded; and whenever a pail had been four or five days a week in use, it was filled to the extent of two thirds or more of its cavity, with liquid dejections, in which the solid excrement was floating."

The pail closet contained several important design considerations. In his 1915 essay to the American Public Health Association, author Richard Messer described some of the more commonly encountered problems:

Any of these [pails] should be provided with handles and be held in place by guide pieces nailed to the floor. Too often no mention is made of the latter in the specifications. Wooden boxes are unsatisfactory for they soon become leaky due to warping, are too heavy to handle and hold excreta long enough to permit the breeding of flies. To keep flies away from the receptacle is a difficult matter. The hinged door at the rear, being exposed to weather, soon warps, leaving openings around the edges, the self-closing seat cover fails to operate properly due to rusty hinges and the front door is seldom kept closed ... The lack of proper attention in regard to cleaning is perhaps the principal drawback to this style of privy and one which makes it practically a failure for general use. In towns it is becoming more and more difficult to find anyone willing to do this kind of work and in rural districts the privy is usually neglected.

—

== Popularity ==
Following the successes seen in various northern towns, about 7,000 pail closets were introduced in 1871 in Leicester, where the implementation of water closets had been hindered by the refusal of the water company to provide adequate supplies. The use of pail closets reduced the demand placed upon the area's inadequate sewerage system, but the town suffered with difficulties in the collection and treatment of the night soil. Initially, night soil was collected by contractors, but after 1873 the local authority became responsible. The authority found dealing with the night soil an expensive and difficult business and, following legal proceedings against the corporation in 1878, transport of night soil was transferred from the railway system to canal barges. This, however, led to complaints that the canal was being polluted. In 1886, the authority found that the River Soar was badly polluted by sewage and so they built a sewage farm at Beaumont Leys. By the end of the 19th century, this and the construction of a new sewer system enabled all pail closets to be phased out and replaced by water closets. In Manchester, faced with phenomenal population growth, the council attempted to retain the pail closet system, but following the exposure of the dumping of 30–60 long tons (30–61 t) of human faeces into the Medlock and Irwell rivers at their Holt Town sewage works, (Note: Holt Town was an area to the east of Manchester, along the River Medlock. The "sanitary works" are visible on late 19th-century Ordnance Survey maps, along Upper Helena Street) the council was forced to change their plans. Originally they had intended to build incinerators, but public objections to the dumping of waste into rivers forced the council instead to purchase Carrington Moss in 1886, and Chat Moss in 1895, which were both developed as refuse disposal sites. But by the 1930s neither site was still receiving night soil, the water closet having replaced dry conservancy in Manchester.

=== Geographic spread ===
The pail system was used throughout Europe, in French cities such as Marseille and Le Havre, and English towns and cities such as Leeds, Birmingham, and Manchester, but it was popular in the town of Rochdale, from which the Rochdale system of pail collection took its name. It was widespread in Australia too.

=== Decline and end ===
In Coventry, the number of pail closets in use declined from about 712 in 1907, to 92 in 1912, and only 16 by 1926.

Pail toilets with municipal collection persisted in Australia well into the second half of the twentieth century. Brisbane, its third most populous city, relied on "dunny carts" until the 1950s (one source says until the 1970s); because the population was so dispersed, it was difficult to install sewerage. Tar, creosote, and disinfectant kept the smell down. Academic George Seddon claimed that "the typical Australian back yard in the cities and country towns" had, throughout the first half of the twentieth century, "a dunny against the back fence, so that the pan could be collected from the dunny lane through a trap-door". Pail toilets with municipal collection was common in cities such as Colombo and Kandy in Ceylon into the late 1950s and 1960s.

== See also ==
- History of water supply and sanitation
- Bucket toilet, also known in some countries as a "honey bucket"
- Composting toilet
- Gong farmer, a historical term to describe someone who dug out and removed human excrement from privies and cesspits
