= Drug pollution =

Pollution of the environment with pharmaceutical drugs and their metabolites

Drug pollution or pharmaceutical pollution is pollution of the environment with pharmaceutical drugs and their metabolites, which reach the aquatic environment (groundwater, rivers, lakes, and oceans) through wastewater. Drug pollution is therefore mainly a form of water pollution.

"Pharmaceutical pollution is now detected in waters throughout the world," said a scientist at the Cary Institute of Ecosystem Studies in Millbrook, New York. "Causes include aging infrastructure, sewage overflows and agricultural runoff. Even when wastewater makes it to sewage treatment facilities, they aren't equipped to remove pharmaceuticals."

== Sources and effects ==
Most simply from the drugs having been cleared and excreted in the urine. The portion that comes from expired or unneeded drugs that are flushed unused down the toilet is smaller, but it is also important, especially in hospitals (where its magnitude is greater than in residential contexts). This includes drug molecules that are too small to be filtered out by existing water treatment plants. The process of upgrading existing plants to use advanced oxidation processes that are able to remove these molecules can be expensive. Drugs such as antidepressants have been found in the United States Great Lakes. Researchers from the University of Buffalo have found high traces of antidepressants in the brains of fish. Fish behavior on antidepressants have been noted to have similar impacts and reducing risk-averse behavior, and thereby reducing survival through predation.

Other sources include agricultural runoff (because of antibiotic use in livestock) and pharmaceutical manufacturing. Drug pollution is implicated in the sex effects of water pollution. It is a suspected a contributor (besides industrial pollution) in fish kills, amphibian dieoffs, and amphibian pathomorphology.

== Pollution of water systems ==
In the early 1990s, pharmaceuticals were found to be present in the environment, which resulted in massive scientific research, new regulations, and public attention. Also during the 1990s, it was discovered that for the synthesis of one kilogram of an active pharmaceutical compound the amount of waste produced was fifty to hundred times that one kilogram, which was ending up in the environment. During the late 1990s, estrogens were discovered in wastewater. It was concluded that this was the cause of feminization of fish. This was another factor that caused greater attention to pharmaceuticals in the environment. Reviews and information on pharmaceuticals present in the environment date back to at least the 1980s. The majority of pharmaceuticals are intended to cause slight adverse effects for the target population. Low concentrations of pharmaceuticals can have negative effects on the freshwater ecosystems.

=== Pharmaceuticals in the environment ===
In the United States, Spain, Germany and the United Kingdom over 101 different pharmaceuticals were present in ground water, surface water, drinking water or tap water. Between 30 and 100 different pharmaceuticals were found present in the aforementioned waters in Thailand, Canada, Australia, India, China, South Korea, Japan, Sweden, Poland, Italy, the Netherlands, France and Brazil.

==== In rivers ====
In 2022, the most comprehensive study of pharmaceutical pollution of the world's rivers finds that it threatens "environmental and/or human health in more than a quarter of the studied locations". It investigated 1,052 sampling sites along 258 rivers in 104 countries, representing the river pollution of 470 million people. It found that "the most contaminated sites were in low- to middle-income countries and were associated with areas with poor wastewater and waste management infrastructure and pharmaceutical manufacturing" and lists the most frequently detected and concentrated pharmaceuticals.

==== Pharmaceuticals and their effects ====
- The excretion of oral contraceptives into freshwater ecosystems has caused fish and amphibians to feminize.
- Antipsychotics were created about seventy years ago and it was not until 2007 that it was reported that antipsychotics were present in the environment. They are used to treat a plethora of illnesses including depression, schizophrenia, autism, attention deficit hyperactivity disorder and bipolar disease. Antipsychotics, once excreted by the patient by either feces or urine, travel to wastewater treatment plants, which does not remove the drugs and their metabolites. These drugs have been found in drinking water, all bodies of water, and hospital sewage. Once they reach the aquatic environment, they possibly undergo bioconcentration and bioaccumulation through the food web.
- Psychiatric drugs, such as fluoxetine, sertraline, citalopram, chlorpromazine and oxazepram, were found to change fish behavior and caused disruption in the hormones of fish. In invertebrates, these drugs were found to cause reproduction toxicity and hormone disruption and alter their behavior.
- Antineoplastic drugs are employed during chemotherapy all over the world. They pollute water courses and have 'mutagenic, cytostatic, and ecotoxicological effects on the micro-organisms that are in the aquatic environment.' The wastewater treatment process is not able to remove antineoplastic drugs due to the intractable nature of them. Bodies of water that are contaminated with antineoplastic drugs possess grave consequences on the aquatic environment and even human health. Chemotherapy drugs such as cyclophosphamide 1, fluorouracil, doxorubicin, cisplatin and mitomycin C were discovered to cause genotoxicity in aquatic organisms.
- Antibiotics are widely produced and consumed to treat bacterial and fungal diseases. Since antibiotics are only partially metabolized, the non-metabolized antibiotics are released into the environment. Due to this, antibiotics are discovered in sludge, drinking water, wastewater, surface water, soil, groundwater and sediments. Residual antibiotics are not easily biodegraded so, they can survive in environments for long periods of time. There are calls for an urgent push to eradicate antibiotics from the environment because they could cause generation of antibiotics resistant bacteria and antibiotics resistance genes, which would pose an immense threat to the ecological system and human health. The excessive use and excretion of antibiotics to waterways makes the problem of antimicrobial resistance worse and will gradually affect the human population, possibly causing more deaths. Antibiotics were found to reduce growth in algae, aquatic plants and environmental bacteria.

==== Groundwater pollution ====
Groundwater contamination by pharmaceuticals, which belong to the category of contaminants of emerging concern (CEC) or emerging organic pollutants (EOP), has been receiving increasing attention in the fields of environmental engineering, hydrology and hydrogeochemistry since the last decades of the twentieth century.

Pharmaceuticals are suspected to provoke long-term effects in aquatic ecosystems even at low concentration ranges (trace concentrations) because of their bioactive and chemically stable nature, which leads to recalcitrant behaviours in the aqueous compartments, a feature that is typically associated with the difficulty in degrading these compounds to innocuous molecules, similarly with the behaviour exhibited by persistent organic pollutants. Furthermore, continuous release of medical products in the water cycle poses concerns about bioaccumulation and biomagnification phenomena. As the vulnerability of groundwater systems is increasingly recognized even from the regulating authority (the European Medicines Agency, EMA), environmental risk assessment (ERA) procedures, which is required for pharmaceuticals appliance for marketing authorisation and preventive actions urged to preserve these environments.

In the last decades of the twentieth century, scientific research efforts have been fostered towards deeper understanding of the interactions of groundwater transport and attenuation mechanisms with the chemical nature of polluting agents. Amongst the multiple mechanisms governing solutes mobility in groundwater, biotransformation and biodegradation play a crucial role in determining the evolution of the system (as identified by developing concentration fields) in the presence of organic compounds, such as pharmaceuticals. Other processes that might impact on pharmaceuticals fate in groundwater include classical advective-dispersive mass transfer, as well as geochemical reactions, such as adsorption onto soils and dissolution / precipitation.

One major goal in the field of environmental protection and risk mitigation is the development of mathematical formulations yielding reliable predictions of the fate of pharmaceuticals in aquifer systems, eventually followed by an appropriate quantification of predictive uncertainty and estimation of the risks associated with this kind of contamination.

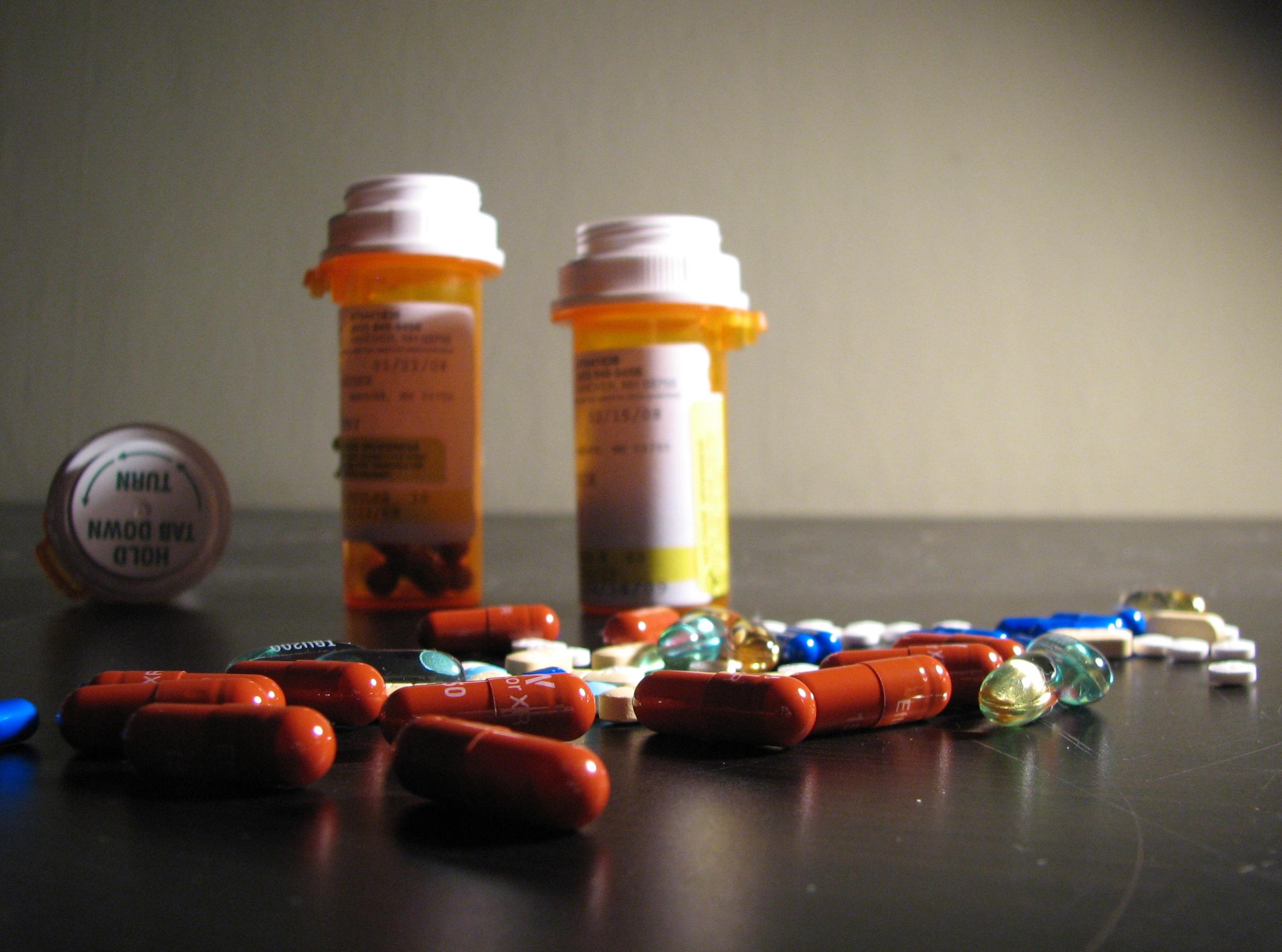
Assorted pharmaceuticals

== Prevention ==
Drug pollution still remains to be a global problem, since current policy techniques are not adequate enough. Most policy approaches remain to be individualized, expensive, and reactive. Biomarkers could be extremely helpful in the risk assessment of pharmaceuticals for decision making in regulations. Biomarkers could help explain if a non-target organism was exposed to a pharmaceutical and the toxicity levels of the pharmaceutical in the organism if it is present.

The main action for preventing drug pollution is to incinerate unwanted pharmaceutical drugs. Burning them chemically degrades their active molecules, with few exceptions. The resulting ash can be further processed before landfilling, such as to remove and recycle any heavy metals that may be present.

There are now programs in many cities that provide collection points at places including drug stores, grocery stores, and police stations. People can bring their unwanted pharmaceuticals there for safe disposal, instead of flushing them (externalizing them to the waterways) or throwing them in the trash (externalizing them to a landfill, where they can become leachate).

Another aspect of drug pollution prevention is environmental law and regulation, although this faces the problems of enforcement costs, enforcement corruption and negligence (see below), and, where enforcement succeeds, increased costs of doing business. The lobbying of pros and cons is ongoing.

== Manufacturing ==
One extreme example of drug pollution was found in India in 2009 in an area where pharmaceutical manufacturing activity is concentrated. Not all pharmaceutical manufacturing contributes to the problem. In places where environmental law and regulation are adequately enforced, the wastewater from the factories is cleaned to a safe level. But to the extent that the market rewards "looking the other way" in developing nations, whether through local corruption (bribed inspectors or regulators) or plausible deniability, such protections are circumvented. This problem belongs to everyone, because consumers in well-regulated places constitute the biggest customers of the factories that operate in the inadequately regulated or inspected places, meaning that externality is involved.

== See also ==
- Reuse of human excreta
