= Groundwater contamination by pharmaceuticals =

Aquifer contamination by medical drugs

Groundwater contamination by pharmaceuticals, which belong to the category of contaminants of emerging concern (CEC) or emerging organic pollutants (EOP), has been receiving increasing attention in the fields of environmental engineering, hydrology and hydrogeochemistry since the last decades of the twentieth century.

Pharmaceuticals are suspected to provoke long-term effects in aquatic ecosystems even at low concentration ranges (trace concentrations) because of their bioactive and chemically stable nature, which leads to recalcitrant behaviours in the aqueous compartments, a feature that is typically associated with the difficulty in degrading these compounds to innocuous molecules, similarly with the behaviour exhibited by persistent organic pollutants. Furthermore, continuous release of medical products in the water cycle poses concerns about bioaccumulation and biomagnification phenomena. As the vulnerability of groundwater systems is increasingly recognized even from the regulating authority (the European Medicines Agency, EMA), environmental risk assessment (ERA) procedures, which is required for pharmaceuticals appliance for marketing authorisation and preventive actions urged to preserve these environments.

In the last decades of the twentieth century, scientific research efforts have been fostered towards deeper understanding of the interactions of groundwater transport and attenuation mechanisms with the chemical nature of polluting agents. Amongst the multiple mechanisms governing solutes mobility in groundwater, biotransformation and biodegradation play a crucial role in determining the evolution of the system (as identified by developing concentration fields) in the presence of organic compounds, such as pharmaceuticals. Other processes that might impact on pharmaceuticals fate in groundwater include classical advective-dispersive mass transfer, as well as geochemical reactions, such as adsorption onto soils and dissolution / precipitation.

One major goal in the field of environmental protection and risk mitigation is the development of mathematical formulations yielding reliable predictions of the fate of pharmaceuticals in aquifer systems, eventually followed by an appropriate quantification of predictive uncertainty and estimation of the risks associated with this kind of contamination.

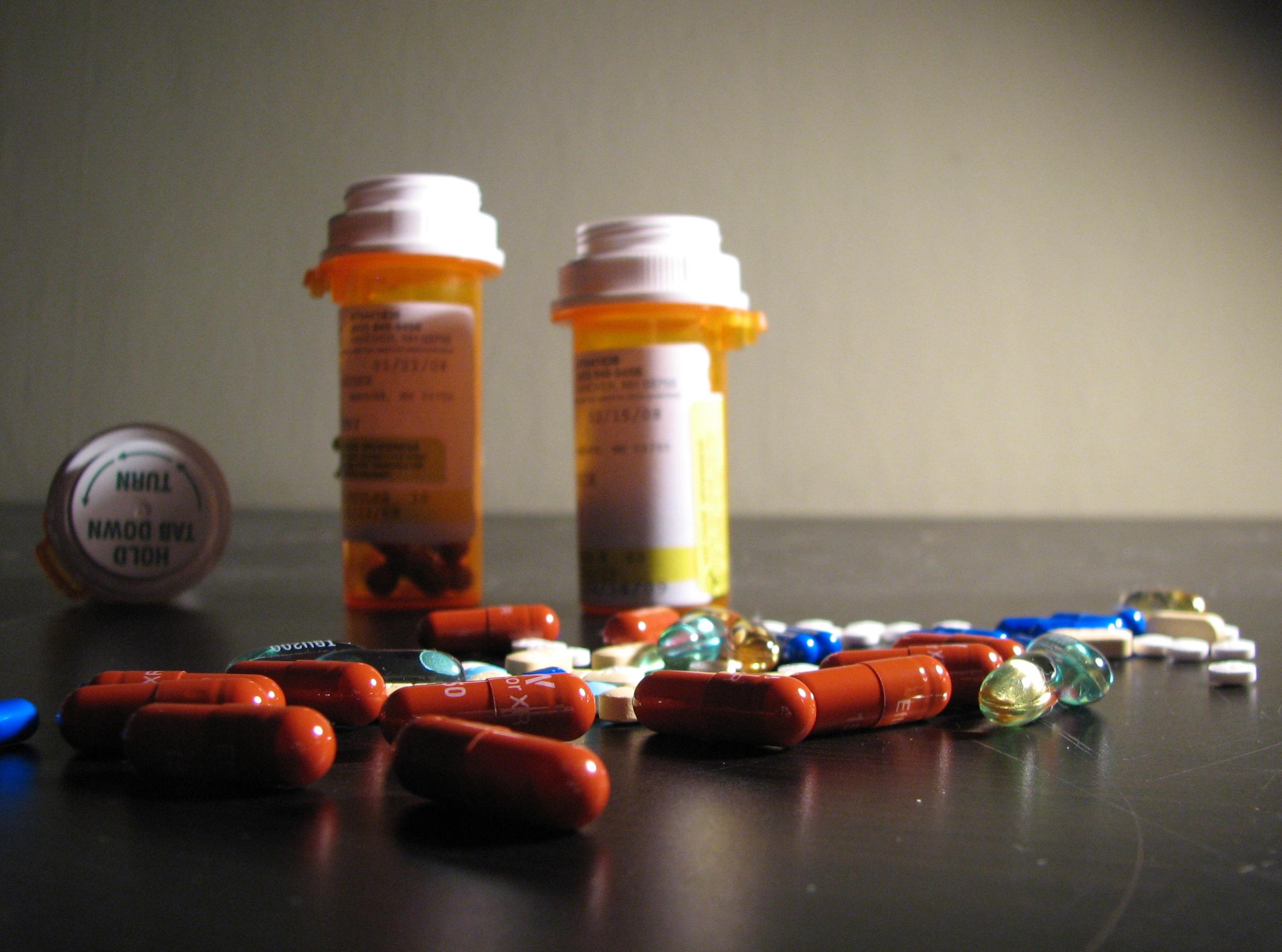
Assorted pharmaceuticals

== General problem ==
Pharmaceuticals represent a serious threat to aquifer systems because of their bioactive nature, which makes them capable of interacting directly with therein residing living microorganisms and yielding bioaccumulation and biomagnification phenomena. Occurrence of xenobiotics in groundwater has been proven to harm the delicate equilibria of aquatic ecosystems in several ways, such as promoting the growth of antibiotic-resistant bacteria or causing hormones-related sexual disruption in living organisms in surface waters. Considering then the role of groundwater systems as main worldwide drinking water resources, the capability of pharmaceuticals to interact with human tissues poses serious concerns also in terms of human health. Indeed, the majority of pharmaceuticals do not degrade in groundwater, where get accumulated due to their continuous release in the environment. Then, these compounds reach subsurface systems through different sources, such as hospital effluents, wastewaters and landfill leachates, which clearly risk contaminating drinking water.

== Most detected pharmaceutical classes ==
The main pharmaceutical classes detected in worldwide groundwater systems are listed below. The following categorisation is based on a medical perspective and it is often referred to as therapeutic classification.

- Antibiotics
- Estrogens and hormones
- Anti-inflammatories and analgesics
- Antiepileptics
- Lipid regulators
- Antihypertensives
- Contrast media
- Antidepressants
- Antiulcer drugs and Antihistamines

Examples of the pharmaceuticals often detected in worldwide groundwater.
Pharmaceutical class	Pharmaceuticals
antibiotics	sulphamethoxazole, triclosan, lincomycin
estrogens and hormones	17-β estradiol, estrone
anti-inflammatories and analgesics	diclofenac, paracetamol, ibuprofen
antiepileptics	carbamazepine
lipid regulators	clofibric acid
antihypertensives	atenolol
antidepressants	benzodiazepine
contrast media	iopamidol

== Chemical aspects relevant to aquifer systems dynamics ==
The chemical structure of pharmaceuticals affects the type of hydro-geochemical processes that mainly impacts on their fate in groundwater and it is strictly associated with their chemical properties. Therefore, a classification of pharmaceuticals based on chemical classes is a valid alternative to the purpose of understanding the role of molecular structures in determining the kind of physical and geochemical processes affecting their mobility in porous media.

With regard to the occurrence of medical drugs in subsurface aquatic systems, the following chemical properties are of major interest:

- Solubility in the aqueous phase

Pharmaceuticals solubility in water affects the mobility of these compounds within aquifers. This feature depends on pharmaceuticals polarity, as polar substances are typically hydrophilic, thereby showing marked tendency to dissolve in the aqueous phase, where they become solutes. This aspect impacts on dissolution / precipitation equilibrium, a phenomenon that is mathematically described in terms of the substance solubility product (addressed in many books with the notation $K_S$).

- Lipophilicity, often measured through the so-called octanol-water partition coefficient (typically addressed as $K_{OW}$)

Large $K_{OW}$ values outline the non polar character of the chemical species, which shows instead particular affinity to dissolve into organic solvents. Therefore, lipophilic pharmaceuticals are markedly subjected to the risk to bioaccumulate and biomagnificate in the environment, consistent with their preferential partition with the organic tissues of living organisms. Sufficiently large $K_{OW}$ pharmaceuticals are in fact subjected to specific tiers in the environmental risk assessment (ERA) procedure (to be supplied for the marketing authorisation application) and are highlighted as potential sources of bioaccumulation and biomagnification according to the EMA guidelines. Lipophilic compounds are then insoluble in water, where they persist as a separated phase from the aqueous one. This renders their mobility in groundwater basically decoupled with dissolution / precipitation mechanisms and attributed to the mean flow transport (advection and dispersion) and soil-mediated mechanisms of reaction (adsorption).

- Affinity of sorption onto the soils

This feature is expressed in terms of the so-called organic carbon-water partition coefficient, that is usually referred to as $K_{OC}$ and is an intrinsic property of the molecule.

- Acidic character

Molecules behaviour in relation to aqueous dissociation reactions is typically related to their acid dissociation constants, that are typically outlined in terms of their $Pk_a$ coefficients.

- Affinity to redox reactions, even in the context of bacterially-mediated metabolic pathways

The molecular structure of xenobiotics typically outlines the existence of several possible reaction pathways, which are embedded in complex reaction networks and are typically referred to as transformation processes. With reference to organic compounds, such as pharmaceuticals, innumerable kinds of chemical reactions exist, most of them involving common chemical mechanisms, such as functional groups elimination, addition and substitution. These processes often involve further redox reactions accomplished on the substrates, which are here represented by pharmaceutical solutes and, eventually, their transformation products and metabolites. These processes can be then classified as either biotic or abiotic, depending on the presence or absence of bacterial communities acting as reaction mediators. In the former case, these transformation pathways are typically addressed as biodegradation or biotransformation in the hydrogeochemical literature, depending on the extent of cleavage of the parent molecule into highly oxidized, innocuous species.

== Transport and attenuation processes ==
The fate of pharmaceuticals in groundwater is governed by different processes. The reference theoretical framework is that of reactive solute transport in porous media at the continuum scale, that is typically interpreted through the advective-dispersive-reactive equation (ADRE). With reference to the saturated region of the aquifer, the ADRE is written as:

$\frac{\partial}{\partial t}(\phi C_W(\boldsymbol {x},t))= - \underbrace {\nabla (\phi C_W(\boldsymbol {x},t)\boldsymbol v (\boldsymbol{x},t))}_{\text{advection}}+ \underbrace{\nabla (\phi \boldsymbol D(\boldsymbol {x},t) \nabla C_W(\boldsymbol {x},t))}_{\text{hydrodynamic dispersion}} +\underbrace{R}_{\text{accumulation}}$

Where $\phi$ represents the effective porosity of the medium, $\boldsymbol {x}$ and $t$ represent - respectively - the spatial coordinates vector and the time coordinate. $\nabla$ represents the divergence operator, except for when it applies to $C_W$, where the nabla symbol stands for gradient of $C_W$. The term $C_W(\boldsymbol{x},t)$ denotes then the pharmaceutical solute concentration field in the water phase (for unsaturated regions of the aquifer, the ADRE equation has a similar shape, but it includes additional terms accounting for volumetric contents and contaminants concentrations in other phases than water), while $\boldsymbol{v}(\boldsymbol{x},t)$ represents the velocity field. $D(\boldsymbol {x},t)$ is the hydrodynamic dispersion tensor and is typically function of the sole variable $\boldsymbol x$. Lastly, the storage term $R$ includes the accumulation or removal contribution due to all possible reactive processes in the system, i.e., adsorption, dissolution / precipitation, acid dissociation and other transformation reactions, such as biodegradation.

The main hydrological transport processes driving pharmaceuticals and organic contaminants migration in aquifer systems are:

- Advection
- Hydrodynamic dispersion

The most influential geochemical processes, also referred to as reactive processes and whose effect is embedded in the term $R$ of the ADRE, include:

- Adsorption onto soil
- Dissolution and precipitation
- Acid dissociation and aqueous complexation
- Biodegradation, biotransformation and other transformation pathways

=== Advection ===
Advective transport accounts for the contribution of solute mass transfer across the system that originates from bulk flow motion. At the continuum scale of analysis, the system is interpreted as a continuous medium rather than a collection of solid particles (grains) and empty spaces (pores) through which the fluid can flow. In this context, an average flow velocity can be typically estimated, which arises upscaling the pore scale velocities. Here, the fluid flow conditions ensure the validity of the Darcy's law, which governs the system evolution in terms of average fluid velocity, typically referred to as seepage or advective velocity. Dissolved pharmaceuticals in groundwater are transferred within the domain along with the mean fluid flow and in agreement with the physical principles governing any other solute migration across the system.

=== Hydrodynamic dispersion ===
Hydrodynamic dispersion identifies a process that arises as summation of two separate effects. First, it is associated with molecular diffusion, a phenomenon that is appreciated at the macroscale as consequence of microscale Brownian motions. Secondly, it includes a contribution (called mechanical dispersion) arising as an effect of upscaling the fluid-dynamic transport problem from the pore to the continuum scale of investigation, due to the upscaling of local dishomogeneous velocities. The latter contribution is therefore not related to the occurrence of any physical process at the pore scale, but it is only a fictitious consequence of the modelling scale choice. Hydrodynamic dispersion is then embedded in the advective-dispersive-reactive equation (ADRE) assuming a Fickian closure model. Dispersion is felt at the macroscale as responsible of a spread effect of the contaminant plume around its center of mass.

=== Adsorption onto soil ===
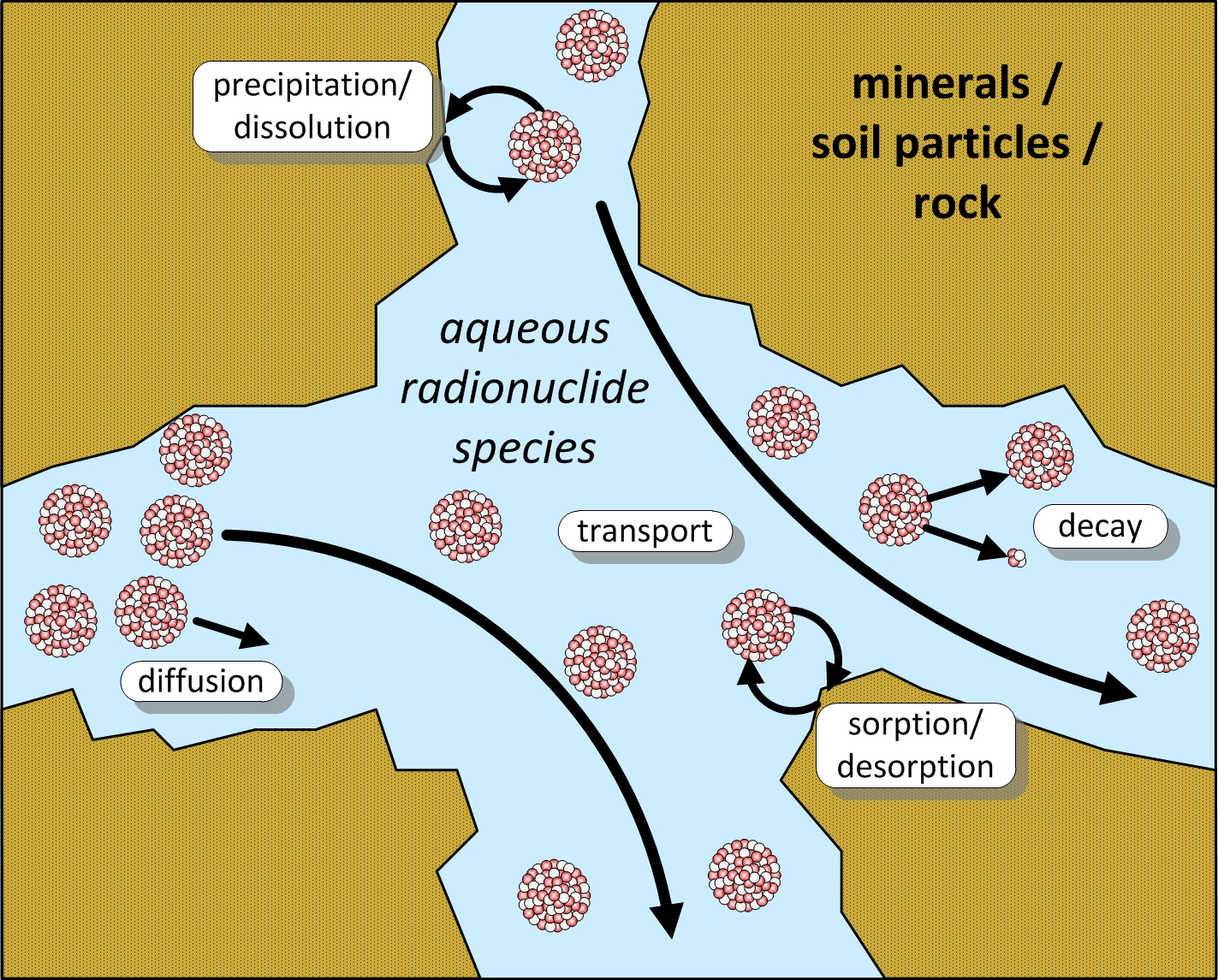
Examples of processes involved in the hydrogeochemical modelling of subsurface flow transport

Sorption identifies a heterogeneous reaction that is often driven by instantaneous thermochemical equilibrium. It describes the process for which a certain mass of solute dissolved in the aqueous phase adheres to a solid phase (such as the organic fraction of soil in the case of organic compounds), being therefore removed from the liquid phase. In hydrogeochemistry, this phenomenon has been proved to cause a delayed effect in solute mobility with respect to the case in which solely advection and dispersion occur in the aquifer. For pharmaceuticals, it can be typically interpreted using a linear adsorption model at equilibrium, which is fully applicable at low concentrations ranges. The latter model relies upon assessment of a linear partition coefficient, usually denoted as $k_d$, that depends - for organic compounds - on both organic carbon-water partition coefficient $K_{OC}$ and organic carbon fraction $f_{OC}$ into soil. While the former term is an intrinsic chemical property of the molecule, the latter one instead depends on the soil moisture of the analyzed aquifer.

Sorption of trace elements like pharmaceuticals in groundwater is interpreted through the following linear isotherm model:

$C_S=k_d C_W$

Where $C_S$ identifies the adsorbed concentration on the solid phase and $k_d \propto K_{OC},f_{OC}$.

The neutral form of the organic molecules dissolved in water is typically the sole responsible of sorptive mechanisms, that become as more important as the soils are rich in terms of organic carbon. Anionic forms are instead insensitive to sorptive mechanisms, while cations can undergo adsorption only in very particular conditions.

=== Dissolution and precipitation ===
Dissolution represents the heterogeneous reaction during which a solid compound, such as an organic salt in the case of pharmaceuticals, gets dissolved into the aqueous phase. Here, the original salt appears in the form of both aqueous cations and anions, depending on the stoichiometry of the dissolution reaction. Precipitation represents the reverse reaction. This process is typically accomplished at thermochemical equilibrium, but in some applications of hydrogeochemical modelling it might be required to consider its kinetics. As an example for the case of pharmaceuticals, the non-steroidal anti-inflammatory drug diclofenac, which is commercialised as sodium diclofenac, undergoes this process in groundwater environments.

=== Acid dissociation and aqueous complexation ===
Acid dissociation is a homogeneous reaction that yields dissociation of a dissolved acid (in the water phase) into cationic and anionic forms, while aqueous complexation denotes its reverse process. The aqueous speciation of a solution is determined on the basis of the $Pk_a$ coefficient, that typically ranges between 3 and 50 (approximately) for organic compounds, such as pharmaceuticals. Being the latter ones weak acids and considering that this process is always accomplished upon instantaneous achievement of thermochemical equilibrium conditions, it is then reasonable to assume that the undissociated form of the original contaminant is predominant in the water speciation for most practical cases in the field of hydrogeochemistry.

=== Biodegradation, biotransformation and other transformation pathways ===
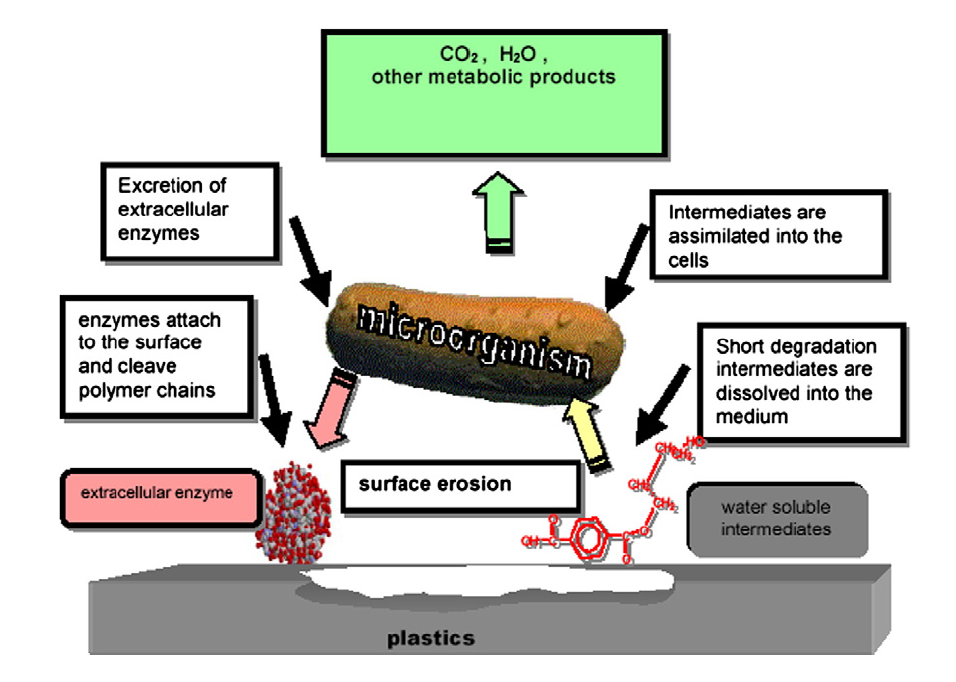
Illustrative example of possible mechanisms of microbial biodegradation

Pharmaceuticals can undergo biotransformation or transformation processes in groundwater systems.

Aquifers are indeed rich reserves in terms of minerals and other dissolved chemical species, such as organic matter, dissolved oxygen, nitrates, ferrous and manganese compounds, sulfates, etc., as well as dissolved cations, such as calcium, magnesium and sodium ones. All of these compounds interact through complex reaction networks embedding reactive processes of different nature, such as carbonates precipitation / dissolution, acid–base reactions, sorption and redox reactions. With reference to the latter kind of processes, several pathways are typically possible in aquifers because the environment is often rich in both reducing (like organic matter) and oxidizing agents (like dissolved oxygen, nitrates, ferrous and Manganese oxides, sulfates etc.). Pharmaceuticals can act as substrates as well in this scenario, i.e., they can represent either the reducing, or the oxidizing agent in the context of redox processes. In fact, most chemical reactions involving organic molecules are typically accomplished upon gain or loss of electrons, so that the oxidation state of the molecule changes along the reactive pathway. In this context, the aquifer acts as a "chemical reactor".

There are innumerable kinds of chemical reactions that pharmaceuticals can undergo in this environment, which depend on the availability of other reactants, pH and other environmental conditions, but all of these processes typically share common mechanisms. The main ones involve addition, elimination or substitution of functional groups. The mechanism of reaction is important in the field of hydrogeochemical modeling of aquifer systems because all of these reactions are typically governed by kinetic laws. Therefore, recognizing the correct molecular mechanisms through which a chemical reaction progresses is fundamental to the purpose of modelling the reaction rates correctly (for example, it is often possible to identify a rate limiting step within multistep reactions and relate the rate of reaction progress to that particular step). Modelling these reactions typically follows the classic kinetic laws, except for the case in which reactions involving the contaminant are accomplished in the context of bacterial metabolism. While in the former case the ensemble of reactions is addressed as transformation pathway, in the latter one the terms biodegradation or biotransformation are used, depending on the extent to which the chemical reactions effectively degrade the original organic molecule to innocuous compounds in their maximum oxidation state (i.e., carbon dioxide, methane and water). In case of biologically mediated pathways of reaction, which are relevant in the study of groundwater contamination by pharmaceuticals, there are appropriate kinetic laws that can be employed to model these processes in hydrogeochemical contexts. For example, the Monod and Michaelis-Menten equations are suitable options in case of biotic transformation processes involving organic compounds (such as pharmaceuticals) as substrates.

Despite most hydrogeochemical literature addresses these processes through linear biodegradation models, several studies have been carried out since the second decade of the twenty-first century, as the former ones are typically too simplified to ensure reliable predictions of pharmaceuticals fate in groundwater and might bias risk estimates in the context of risk mitigation applications for the environment.

== Hydrologic and geochemical modelling approaches ==
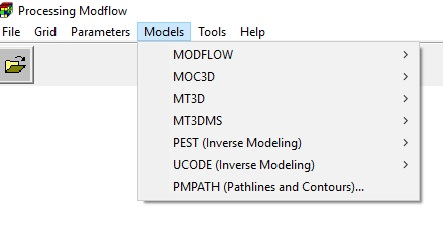
Tools of MODFLOW for Windows

Groundwater contamination by pharmaceuticals is a topic of great interest in the field of the environmental and hydraulic engineering, where most research efforts have been fostered towards studies on this kind of contaminants since the beginning of the twenty-first century. The general goal of those disciplines is that of developing interpretive models capable to predict the behaviour of aquifer systems in relation to the occurrence of various types of contaminants, among which are included also medical drugs. Such goal is motivated by the necessity to provide mathematical tools to predict, for example, how contaminants concentration fields develop across the aquifer along time. This may provide useful information to support decision-making processes in the context of environmental risk assessment procedures. To this purpose, several interdisciplinary strategies and tools are typically employed, the most fundamental ones being listed below:

- Numerical modelling strategies are employed to simulate hydrogeochemical transport models. Some examples of commonly used softwares are MODFLOW and PHREEQC, but there are plenty of available software that can be used.
- Statistical inference tools are used to calibrate available hydrogeochemical models against raw data. A widely employed software is, for example, PEST.
- Knowledge in organic chemistry stands as fundamental prerequisite to develop geochemical models to be fit against data.
- Laboratory or field scale experiments are designed to obtain raw data, which are necessary to study the behaviour of aquifer systems under exposure to compounds of concern.

All of these interdisciplinary tools and strategies are contemporarily employed to analyse the fate of pharmaceuticals in groundwater.

== See also ==
- Groundwater pollution
- Environmental impact of pharmaceuticals and personal care products
- Reactive transport modeling in porous media
- Computer simulation
