= Awash River =

Major river in Ethiopia

Awash River Great Dir River (historical)
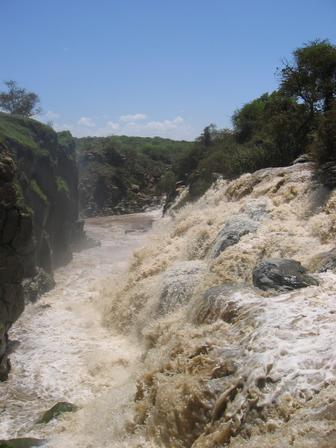
- Awash River, Ethiopia

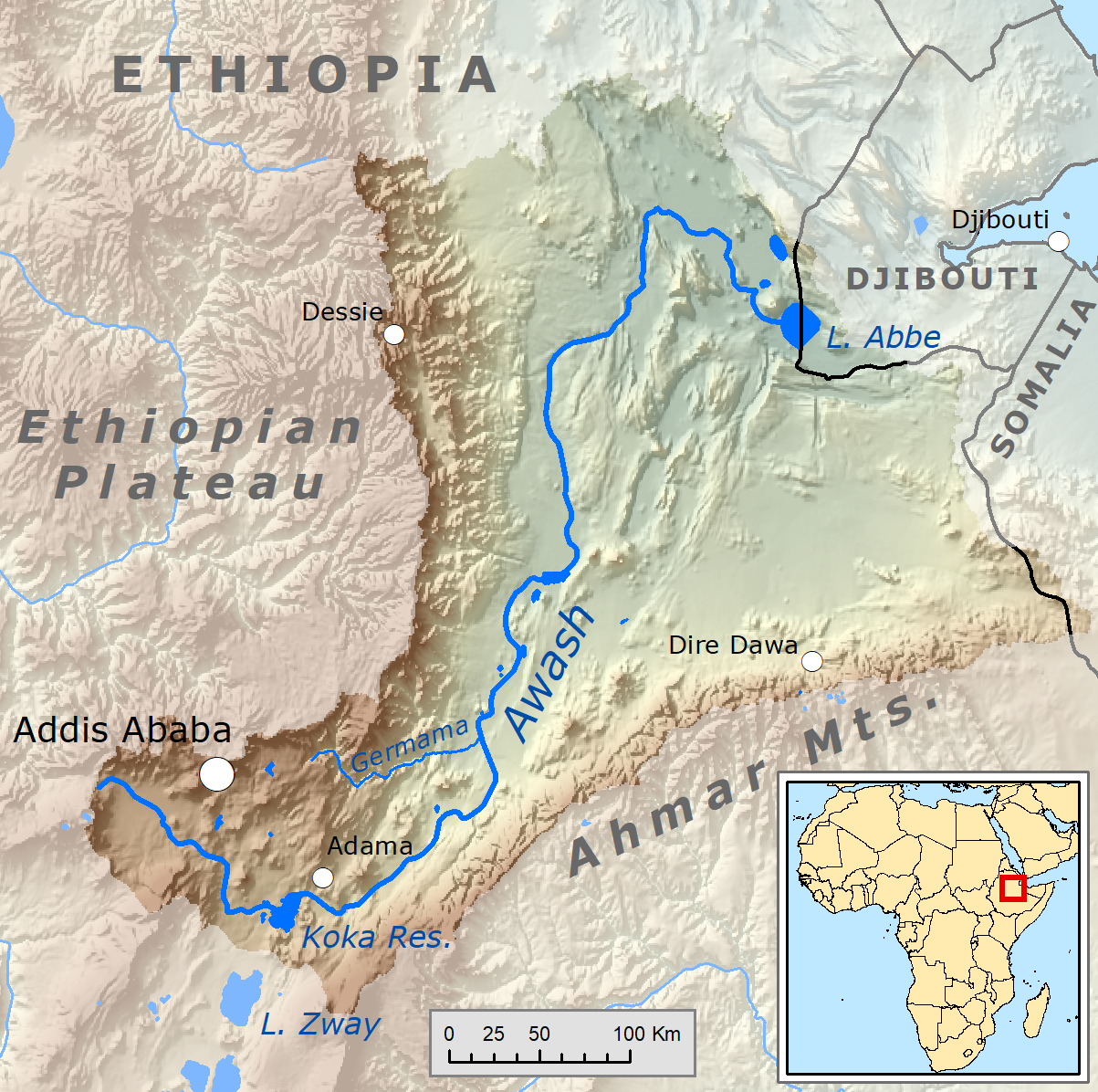
- Map showing the Awash River drainage basin
- Native name: Awaash (Oromo); ዐዋሽ (Amharic); Hawaash We'ayot (Afar); Webiga Dir (Somali)

Location
- Country: Ethiopia
- Regions: Afar, Oromia, Addis Ababa, Central Ethiopia
- Cities: Addis Ababa, Metehara, Awash, Gewane, Asaita, Awash 7 Kilo, Ambo, Sebeta, Bishoftu, Gelan, Adama, Modjo

Physical characteristics
- Source: Ethiopian Highlands
  - location: Near the town of Ginchi, West Shewa, Oromia
  - coordinates: 9°05′48″N 38°10′01″E
  - elevation: 2,929 m (9,610 ft)
- Mouth: Lake Abbe
  - coordinates: 11°08′53″N 41°41′08″E
  - elevation: 248 m (814 ft)
- Length: 1,200 km (750 mi)
- Basin size: 69,196 km^{2} (26,717 sq mi)
- Discharge
  - location: Mouth
  - average: 151.9 m^{3}/s (5,360 cu ft/s)
  - minimum: 37.9 m^{3}/s (1,340 cu ft/s)
  - maximum: 510.5 m^{3}/s (18,030 cu ft/s)

Basin features
- Population: 17,900,000
- Tributaries
  - left: Logiya, Mille, Borkana, Ataye, Hawadi, Kabenna, Dukem, Germama, Akaki, Dechatu, Keleta, and Modjo Rivers
  - right: Gololcha

The Awash River (sometimes spelled Awaash; Oromo: Awaash or Hawaas, Amharic: ዐዋሽ, Afar: Hawaash We'ayot, Somali: Webiga Dir, Italian: Auasc) is a major river of Ethiopia. Its course is entirely contained within the boundaries of Ethiopia and empties into a chain of interconnected lakes that begins with Lake Gargori and ends with Lake Abbe (or Abhe Bad) on the border with Djibouti, about 100 kilometres (62 mi) from the head of the Gulf of Tadjoura. The Awash River is the principal stream of an endorheic drainage basin covering parts of the Amhara, Oromia and Somali Regions, as well as the southern half of the Afar Region. The Awash River basin, spanning 23 administrative zones, covers 10% of Ethiopia's area.

The basin usually has two rainy seasons, a shorter one around March (Belg), and a longer one between June and September (Kiremt), which partly fall into one longer rainy season. Climate change is predicted to increase the water deficiency in all seasons and for parts of the basin, due to a projected increase in temperature and decrease in precipitation.

The Awash River basin is the most developed, utilized, abused, impacted, and most populous (over 15% or nearly 18.6 million out of 120 million) basin in Ethiopia (as of 2021). Rapid growth of agriculture, industries and urbanization within the basin, as well as population growth is placing increasing demands on the basin's water resources. The main sources of water pollution in the upper Awash basin come from industrial and urban wastes, agricultural runoff (pesticides, fertilizers), and sewage discharge. Polluting industries in the basin include tanneries, paint factories, slaughterhouses, textiles, breweries, soft drink factories, sugar factories, hospitals, and pharmaceuticals.

The Awash Valley (and especially the Middle Awash) is internationally famous for its high density of hominin fossils, offering unparalleled insight into the early evolution of humans. "Lucy", one of the most famous early hominin fossils, was discovered in the lower Awash Valley. For its palaeontological and anthropological importance, the lower valley of the Awash was inscribed on UNESCO's World Heritage List in 1980.

== Geography ==
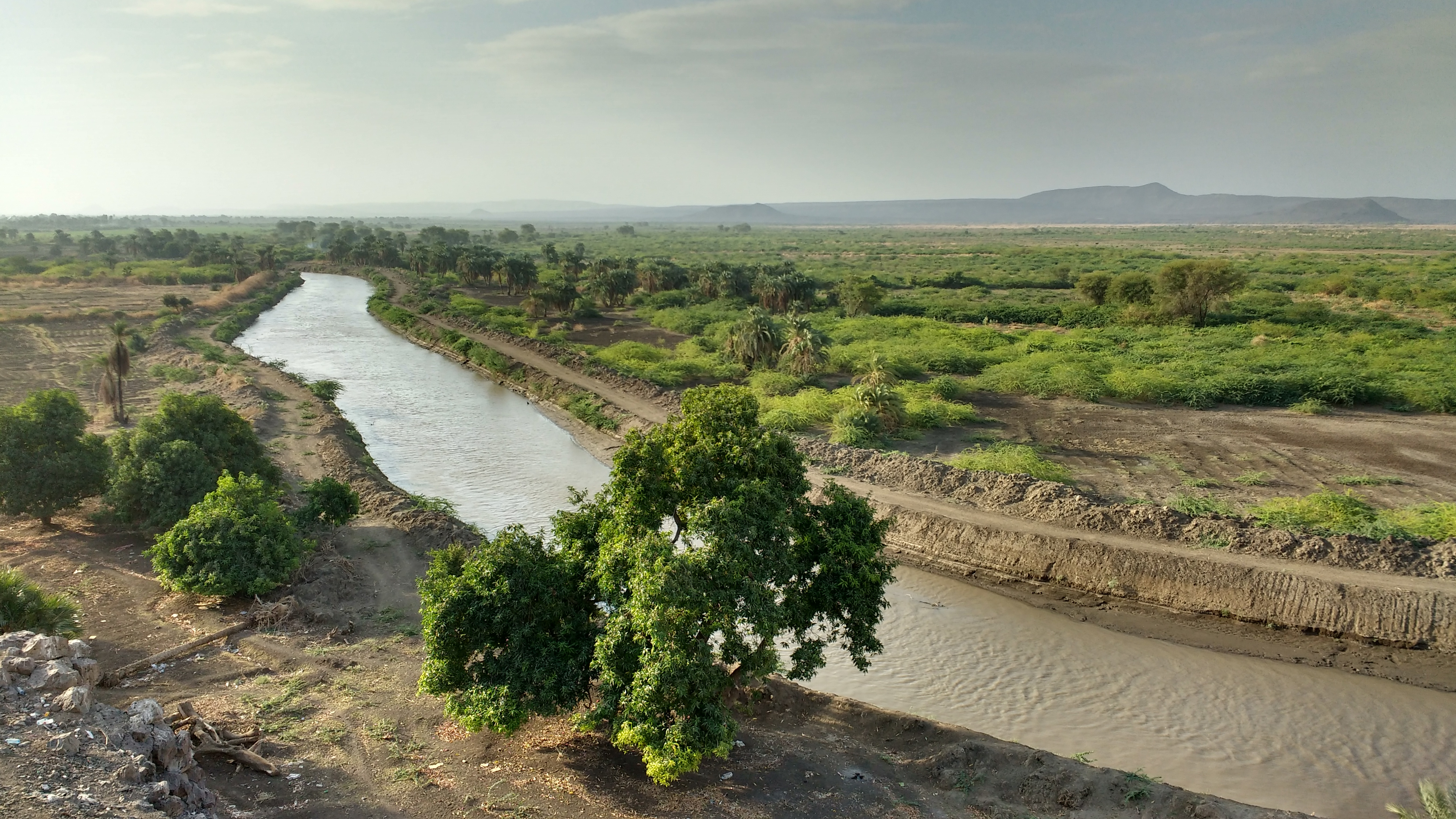
Awash River near Asaita (2015)

The Awash River basin, spanning 23 administrative zones, covers 10% of Ethiopia's area and hosts about 17% of its population. It is partly located in the Main Ethiopian Rift. The Awash River is 1,200 kilometres (750 mi) long. It starts in Ethiopia’s central highlands at an elevation of 3,000 metres (9,800 ft) and passes through a number of locations before joining Lake Abbe at a height of 250 metres (820 ft). The Awash River basin is divided into three sections: upper, middle, and lower.

The Awash rises south of Mount Warqe, west of Addis Ababa in the woreda of Dendi, close to the town of Ginchi, West Shewa Zone, Oromia. After entering the bottom of the Great Rift Valley, the Awash flows south to loop around Mount Zuqualla in an easterly then northeasterly direction, before entering Koka Reservoir. There, water is used for the irrigation of sugar cane plantations. Downstream, the Awash passes the city of Adama and the Awash National Park. It is then joined on its left bank by its chief affluent, the Germama (or Kasam) River, before turning northeast at approximately 11°0′N 40°30′E as far north as 12° before turning completely east to reach lake Gargori.

Other tributaries of the Awash include (in order upstream): the Logiya, Mille, Borkana, Ataye, Hawadi, Kabenna and Dukem Rivers. Towns and cities along its course include Metehara, Awash, Gewane and Asaita.

There are tributary rivers, lakes, hot springs, and swamps in the Middle Awash Basin.

== Climate ==
The climate of the Awash River basin is mostly influenced by the movement of the intertropical convergence zone (ITCZ). During its movement northwards in March/April and its retreat southwards, ITCZ creates two rainy seasons, a shorter one around March (Belg), and a longer one between June and September (Kiremt), which partly fall into one longer rainy season. The rainy season tends to be bimodal towards eastern Ethiopia and almost unimodal towards western Ethiopia. The time between October and March is a dry season, called Bega. Semi-arid to arid conditions prevail in the Rift Valley. In contrast, the highlands partly receive more than 1,600 millimetres (63 in) of rainfall in ca. six months per year.

=== Climate change ===
A study in 2018 investigated the effects of climate change on water resources in the Awash basin. They used three climate models from Coupled Models Intercomparison Project phase 5 (CMIP5) and for three future periods (2006–2030, 2031–2055, and 2056–2080). The models were selected based on their performance in capturing historical precipitation characteristics. The baseline period used for comparison was 1981–2005. The future water availability was estimated as the difference between precipitation and potential evapotranspiration projections using the Representative Concentration Pathway (RCP8.5) emission scenarios. The projections for the future three periods show an increase in water deficiency in all seasons and for parts of the basin, due to a projected increase in temperature and decrease in precipitation. This decrease in water availability will increase water stress in the basin, further threatening water security for different sectors.

== Hydrology ==
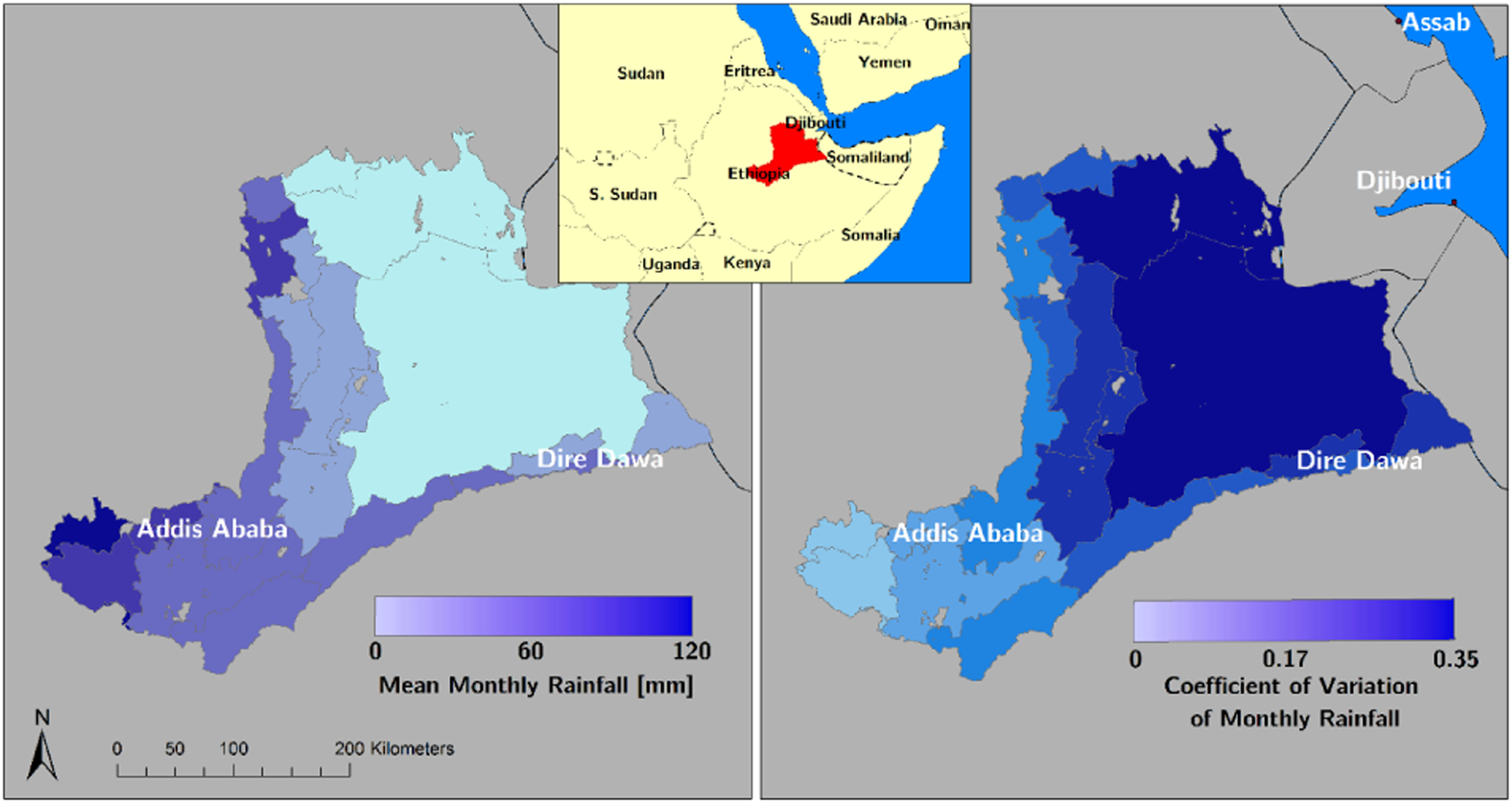
Mean (left panel) and coefficient of variation (right panel) of monthly rainfall by administrative zone in the Awash basin (1979–2015).

=== Rainfall, droughts and floods ===
Rainfall varies a lot in the basin from one year to the next (this is called high intra-annual variability). Dry season water shortage is recognized as a challenge for various activities such as irrigation and domestic water supply by the Awash Basin Authority. However, flooding also occurs frequently during the main rainy season in July and August. The type of flooding is different for the upper, middle and lower Awash basin. Research has found that "the type and range of flooding in the Awash Basin varies widely reflecting the basin’s complex geography". For example, in urban areas, flash floods and river overflows are known to occur.

Rapid growth of agriculture, industries and urbanization within the Awash basin, as well as population growth is placing increasing demands on the basin’s water resources. The basin is known for high climate variability involving droughts and floods, and climate change will likely intensify the existing challenges. Future water management strategies needs to be inclusive of all sectors and consider the equity for different users.

Flood adaption measures have been investigated and one of the recommendations is to use "land-use planning that is 'flood-centric' in its thinking and approach [...]. This means identifying (and protecting) flood zones near build-up areas and identifying zones that can be allowed to flood to absorb the impact of extreme events."

=== Groundwater ===
Groundwater recharge varies between values exceeding 350 millimetres (14 in) per year in the upper highlands and no recharge at the bottom of the rift valley. Groundwater is predominantly recharged at the escarpments and highlands above 1,900 m a.s.l., where annual rainfall is higher than 1,000 millimetres (39 in). Localized small-scale recharge is also supposed to occur at the flanks of the rift valley volcanoes. Artificial groundwater recharge takes further place at irrigated plantations at the rift valley. Recharge from river channel losses and via infiltration from lakes plays a role in the Main Ethiopian Rift and in southern Afar.

The Awash Basin is a densely populated and industrialized area where numerous enterprises rely on groundwater for their operation. Therefore, the majority of human development initiatives in the basin will continue to depend heavily on the quantity and quality of groundwater. Groundwater management requires proactive measures due to the global challenges posed by rapid population growth, urbanization, climate change, and various human activities.

== Ecology ==
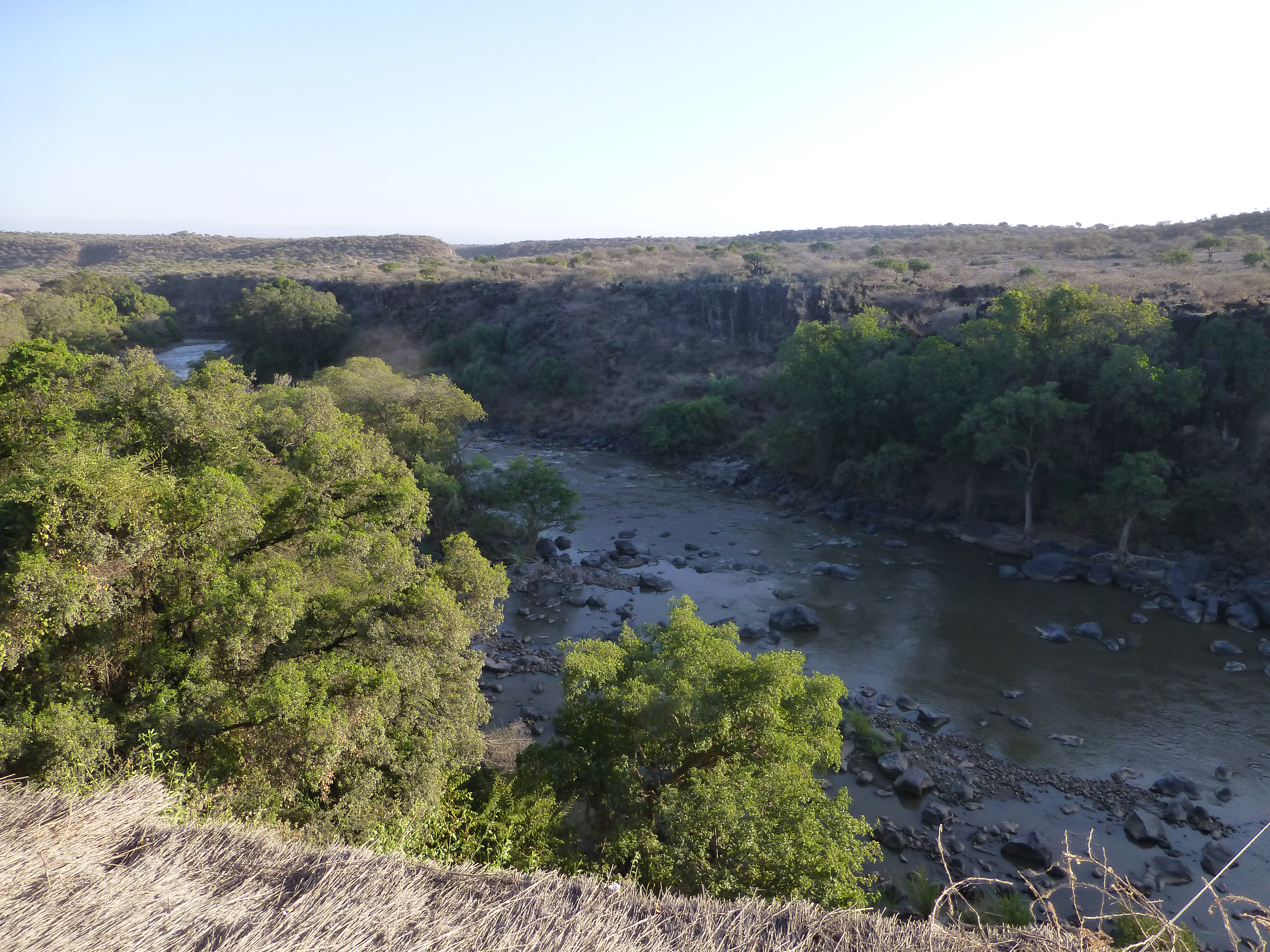
Awash River in the Awash National Park

Most of the Awash basin is part of the Ethiopian montane forests ecoregion. At high altitudes the Ethiopian montane grasslands and woodlands and Ethiopian montane moorlands predominate. The Somali Acacia–Commiphora bushlands and thickets ecoregion occupies low elevations in the Rift.

The basin's vegetation has a strong anthropogenic impact. All over the upper and central Awash basin, remains of different savanna types are still clearly visible. They range from thorn savannas in the lower rift, bush, grass and open savannas above 800 m and woody savannas on the escarpments and the highlands.

=== Fauna ===
The lower Awash Valley is one of the last wildlife preserves for the African wild ass. The mammal is now extinct in Yangudi Rassa National Park, but still found in the adjacent Mille-Serdo Wildlife Reserve. Other large animals native to the area include Beisa Oryx, Soemmering's gazelle, Dorcas gazelle, gerenuk and Grevy's zebra. Crocodiles also flourish within the river.

== Human activities and impacts ==
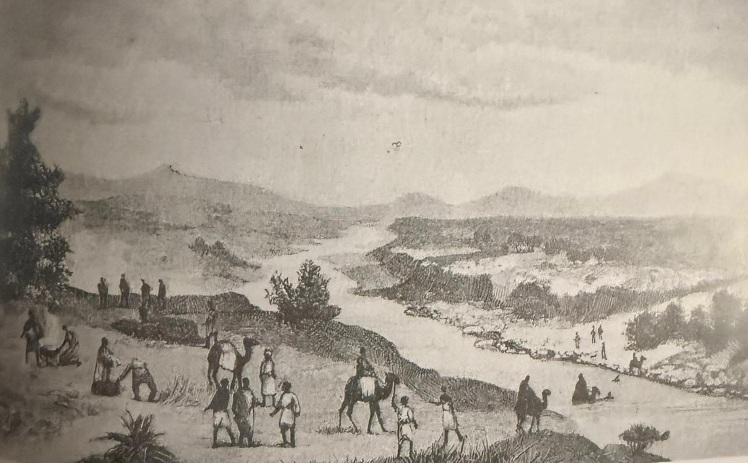
Illustration of a camel convoy on the Awash River in the nineteenth century by Guglielmo Massaia

The Awash basin is the most developed, utilized, abused, impacted, and most populous (over 15% or nearly 18.6 million out of 120 million) basin in Ethiopia. Middle Awash is known for having both large- and small-scale irrigation, as well as agroindustry and sugar factories (Wenji, Methara, and Kesem Sugar factories).

=== Water supply ===
The water supplies of the major urban centers like Addis Ababa, Mojo and Adama, and also, the irrigation waters for local and commercial agricultural lands (such as sugarcane plantation) depend on the Awash River and its tributaries.

=== Economic activities ===
The Awash basin's economy is dominated by the agricultural and service sectors, with the latter prevailing in the large urban center of Addis Ababa. Agriculture dominates water use (about 89% of total water use in the basin) and is expected to continue to be the basis for economic growth in the coming years. Crop production in particular is a major component of the basin's economy and has seen rapid growth in recent years, with the value of output expanding by 7.9% per year in real terms between 2004 and 2014. As of 2012, the total irrigated area of the basin is less than 2% of the total area under cultivation.

Forestry hardly exists inside the Awash River basin, with a few exceptions of small eucalyptus plantations. Outside of Awash National Park the open and woody savannas have been almost completely cultivated with crops. This especially accounts for all escarpment terraces. Thereby the scattered tree cover remained similar to the primary state of the savannas, while the grass layer has been replaced by crops. Only highest altitudes still show connected woodlands. Partly reforestation was carried out on not cultivable altitudes with secondary coniferous forests. The cultivated crops are (endemic) teff, maize, sorghum, beans and vegetables.

Pastures hardly exist where agriculture is possible. The cattle graze on field edges and waysides and on steep escarpments. This is one major reason for erosion, because vegetation cover is partly destroyed. Stubble-grazing is a common practice in the Awash basin.

Recurrent extreme wet and dry weather events challenge economic activities in the basin. The large portion of rural poor engaged in rainfed agriculture in the drought-prone marginal lands located in the middle and lower reaches of the basin suffer greatly from recurring drought.

Climate variability already has a severe impact on populations and economic productivity in the Awash basin. Severe droughts in the basin have led to a significant depression of crop yields and death of livestock, resulting in increases in food insecurity. A modest (5%) decrease in rainfall was estimated to reduce the basin’s gross domestic product (GDP) 5%, with a 10% decrease in agricultural productivity. Humanitarian assistance requests are relatively common due to climate shocks, such as the 2015/2016 El Niño events which resulted in a severe drought and a humanitarian response targeting over 10 million people nationally, with many priority districts located in the Awash basin.

=== Pollution ===
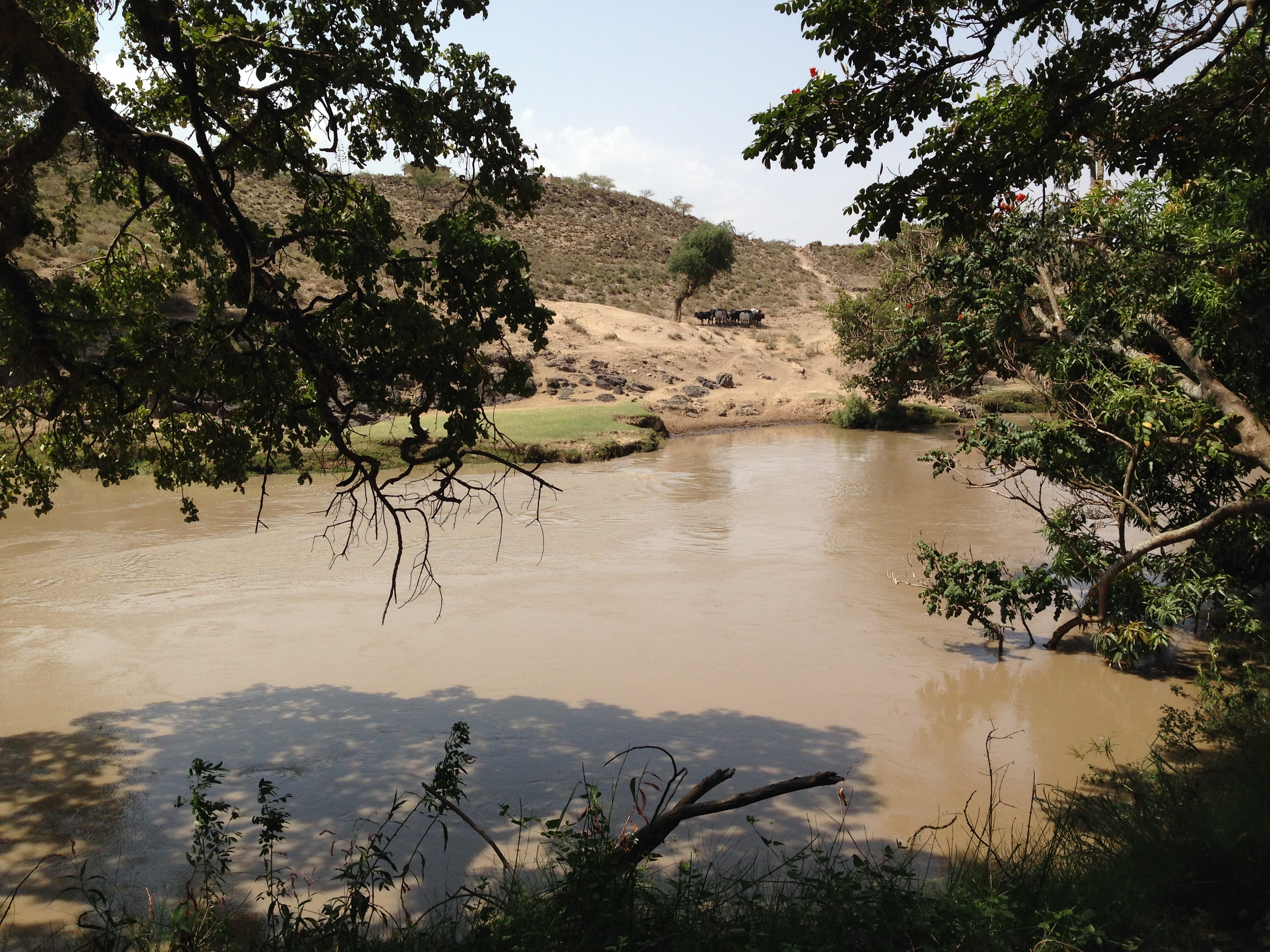
The Awash River at Sodere, Ethiopia (2014)

Municipal and industrial wastewater treatment plants are scant and inefficient in the Awash River basin. Where they exist, their effluents (often poorly treated) are channeled into nearby streams, thus polluting them.

Growing industrialization and urbanization in the Awash River basin has severely damaged the ecosystem due to the toxins discharged into water bodies. The main sources of water pollution in the upper Awash River basin come from industrial and urban wastes, agricultural runoff (pesticides, fertilizers), and sewage discharge. Both anthropogenic and geogenic activities contribute to the observed water quality degradation. The term geogenic refers to naturally occurring contamination through tectonic, clay, volcanic ash, and sand weathering phenomena.

Heavy metal pollution in the surface water has become a growing concern for the environment and people’s health. Polluting industries in the Awash River basin include tanneries, paint factories, slaughterhouses, textiles, breweries, soft drink factories, sugar factories, hospitals, and pharmaceuticals. Wastewater enters the river from cities such as Addis Abeba, Awash 7 Kilo, Ambo, Sebeta, Bishoftu, Gelan, Adama, Modjo. Agricultural runoff may be a cause of heavy metal pollution (As, Cd, Cu, Pb, U, and Zn) in aquatic bodies, and industrial disposal could also lead to high heavy metals concentrations such as As, Cd, Cr, Hg, Ni, Zn, and Pb concentrations.

=== Water quality ===
A study of river water quality in 2023 showed that high levels of heavy metals, such as Al, Mn, Mo, As, V, Fe, and Ba were exhibited with values of 1257 μg/L, 626.8 μg/L, 116.7 μg/L, 61.2 μg/L, 100.5 μg/L, 1082.7 μg/L, and 211.7 μg/L, respectively. Among 20 heavy metals analyzed, 20% of the parameters within the study area were above the WHO limit for drinking water; Al (157 μg/L), V (100.5 μg/L), Fe (1082.7 μg/L), Mn (626.8 μg/L), and Mo (103.8 μg/L) were exhibited at sites along the river system. This is a problem as water from the river is used as a source of drinking water and irrigation.

The presence of emerging organic contaminants in the river water is another concern. These substances include pharmaceuticals, personal care products, industrial byproducts, and agricultural chemicals. High levels of emerging organic contaminants were detected in a study in 2023 in the river and shallow groundwater systems: "Pesticides, veterinary drugs, artificial sweeteners, and personal care products were detected in samples from all sources (surface, ground, and tap water). Endocrine disruptors and equine drugs were found in both surface and groundwater sources."

The river water and shallow groundwater are intrinsically connected. Contaminants in the river water can pollute the groundwater and vice versa. A study in 2024 investigated the characteristics of groundwater in a region of Middle Awash for multipurpose use. It found that contaminants such as arsenic, vanadium, gallium, lithium, rubidium, chromium, manganese, copper, and zinc were found enriched in groundwater near Lake Beseka, majorly influenced by geogenic activities, volcanic ash, and weathering of rocks. Over half of the groundwater sources were unsuitable for drinking, posing significant health risks to local communities that rely heavily on these sources due to limited access to clean surface water.

In the Middle Awash Basin and the country at large, the water quality of most groundwater sources is inadequately monitored and insufficiently regulated. Consequently, areas within the upstream Awash Basin, particularly around Modjo, Bishoftu, Gelan, and Addis Ababa, are highly susceptible to unregulated abstraction and pollution of groundwater.

== Paleontology ==
Lower Valley of the Awash
UNESCO World Heritage Site
- Interactive map of Lower Valley of the Awash
- Location: Ethiopia
- Criteria: Cultural: (ii)(iii)(iv)
- Reference: 10
- Inscription: 1980 (4th Session)

Humans have lived in the valley of the Awash almost since the beginning of the species. Numerous pre-human hominid remains have been found in the Middle Awash. The remains found in the Awash Valley date from the late Miocene, Pliocene, and early Pleistocene (roughly 5.6–2.5 million years ago), and include fossils of many Australopithecines, including "Lucy", the most famous individual Australopithecus. Other extinct hominids discovered at the site include Homo erectus and Ardipithecus.

== History ==
In the 16th century the Awash River was called the great Dir river and lay in the country of the Muslims.

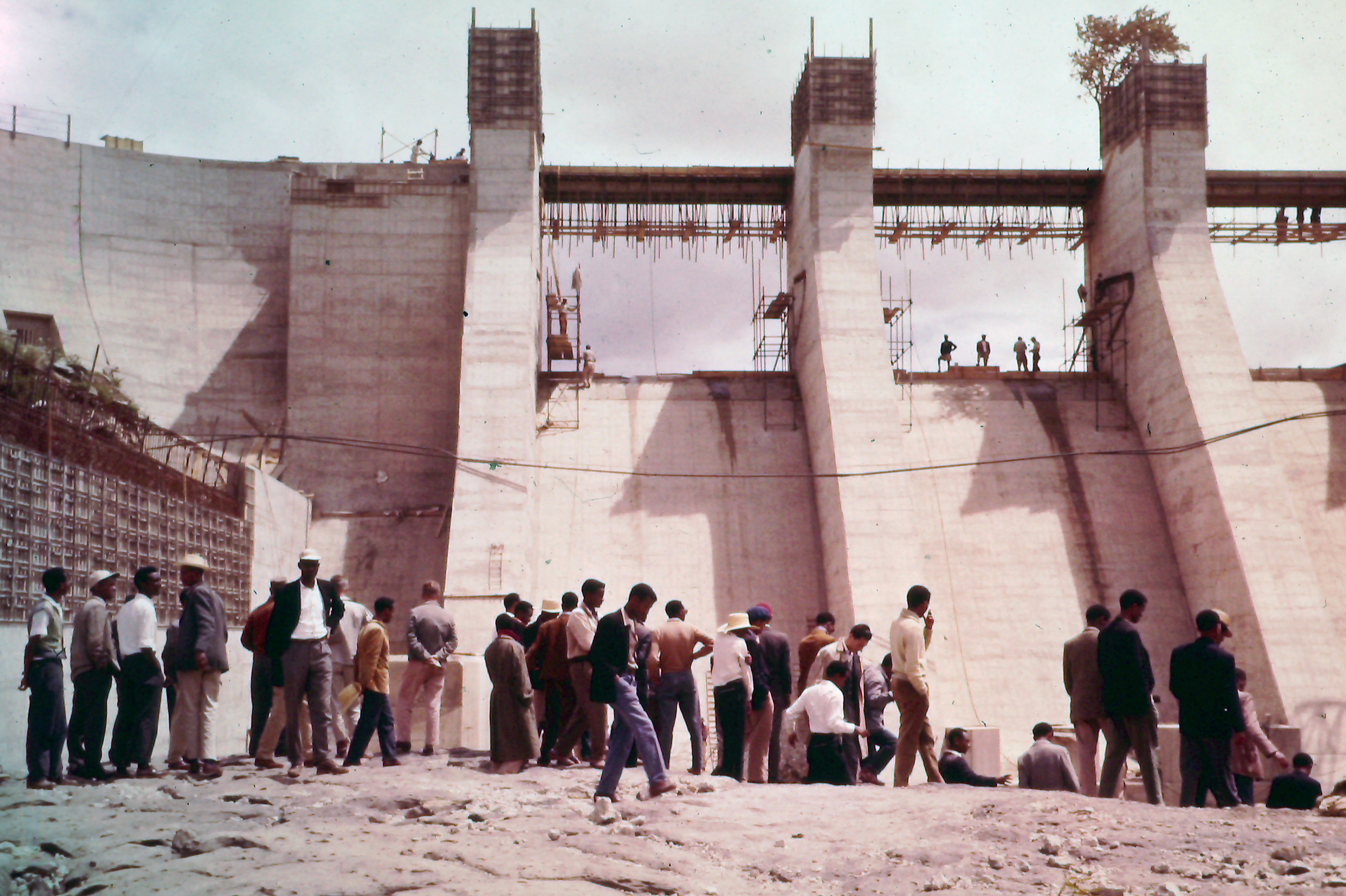
The Koka Dam before it was completed 1960, creating the Koka Reservoir

=== 20th Century ===
The first European to trace the course of the Awash to its end in the Aussa oasis was Wilfred Thesiger in 1933/1934, who started at the city of Awash, followed the river's course to its final end in Lake Abhebad, and continued his expedition east to Tadjoura. (Although the explorer L. M. Nesbitt had followed parts of the course of the Awash in 1928, he turned away from the river at Asaita and proceeded north through the Afar Depression to the Red Sea.)

In 1960, the Koka Dam was completed across the Awash River at a point around 75 kilometres (47 mi) from Addis Ababa. With its opening, it became a major source of hydroelectric power in the area. The resulting freshwater lake, Lake Gelila (also known as the Koka Reservoir), has an area of about 180 square kilometres (69 sq mi). Both lake and dam are threatened by increasing sedimentation.

== Society and culture ==
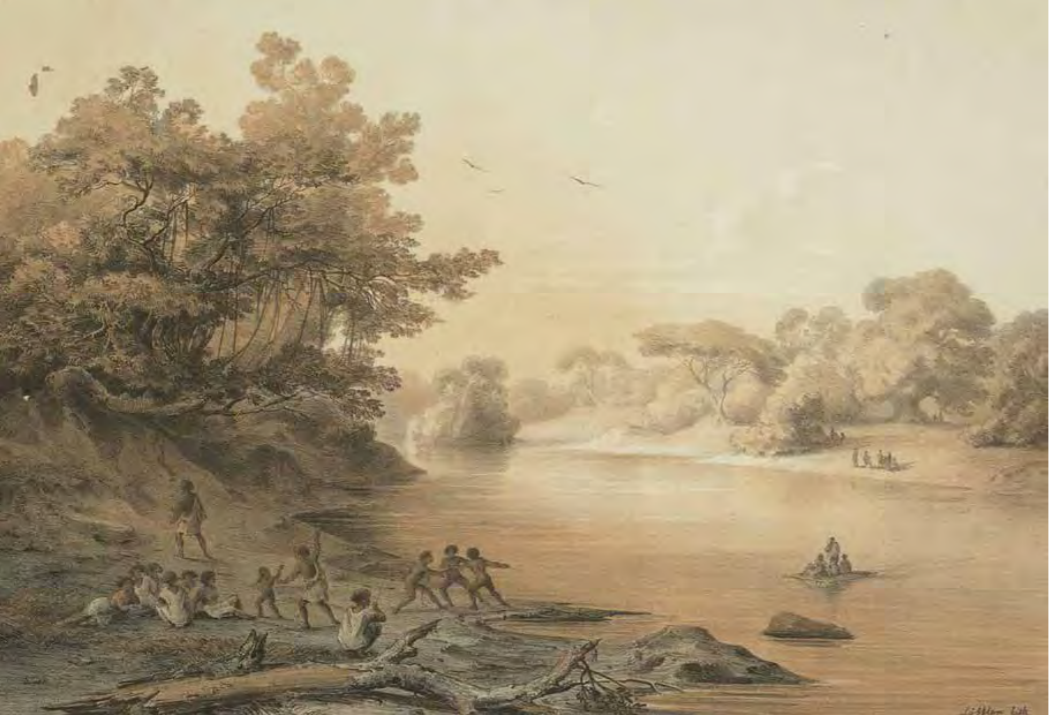
The Awash River, forded by camel caravan, a nineteenth century engraving (in 1852)

The valley of the Awash from about 9° N downstream is the traditional home of the Afar people and Issa Somali clan. The valley of the Awash have been included as part of the Fatagar, Ifat, and Shewa.

The Awash International Bank is named after the Awash River.

== See also ==
- Adama–Awash Expressway
- Awash–Weldiya Railway
- List of rivers of Ethiopia
- List of fossil sites (with link directory)
- List of hominina (hominid) fossils (with images)
- List of most polluted rivers
- List of World Heritage Sites in Ethiopia
