= Jes Vollertsen =

Danish professor of environmental studies (born 1961)

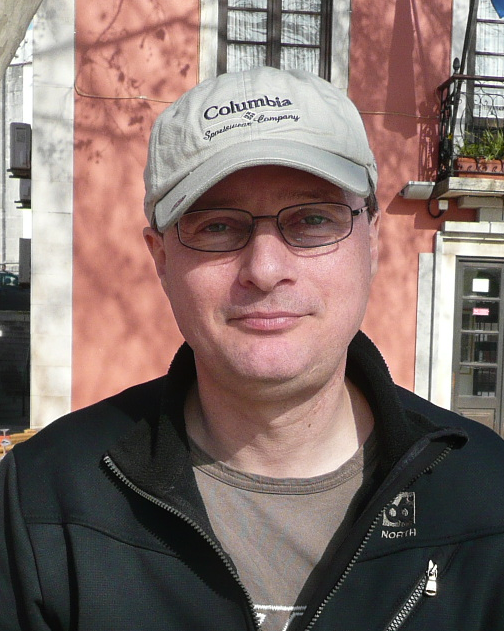
- Born: 23.06.1961; Slesvig
- Citizenship: Denmark
- Occupation: Professor

Jes Vollertsen (born 23.06.1961) is a Danish professor of environmental studies at Aalborg University. He holds a degree in environmental engineering from 1989 from Aalborg University and began his career working in the private and public sector on topics related to polluted water. During this time, he honed his skills on environmental engineering as well as computer modelling and operation control.

== Career ==
In 1995 he came back to Aalborg University and did a PhD on the rather ‘down to earth’ topic of sewer sediments. He made extensively use of his practical experience on how to make things work in real life and combined this with an understanding of chemical, biological, and physical processes. Following his PhD, he became assistant professor, then associate professor and finally full professor of environmental engineering at Aalborg University.

In the beginning, his research was focus solely on chemical and biological processes in sewers, and how to measure and model them. He has addressed topics ranging from physical processes such as sewer ventilation over chemical processes such as sulfide precipitation to biological processes such as the formation and fate of malodorous compounds. In 2013 he received the Eddy Wastewater Principles/Processes Medal, given out once a year by the Water Environment Federation. Jes is not only an outstanding scientist but also an experienced practitioner with regard to applying the knowledge in real sewer systems. He has led projects analyzing odor and corrosion issues in the complex sewer networks of large cities as well as projects addressing fine details in sewer networks, like developing intelligent and feed-back based dosing strategies to manage hydrogen sulfide.

A bit into his career, he started working on stormwater management, with focus on treatment of the stormwater and the involved biological and chemical processes and pollutants. He has worked on many aspects of stormwater treatment, for example wet retention ponds. He has developed conceptual design methods and models based on pond processes and worked on more advanced treatment based on sorption and precipitation technologies, where he has designed, constructed, and monitored full-scale advanced treatment systems. He has furthermore worked on biological aspects of systems for stormwater management, for example on eutrophication of stormwater ponds and models to describe the underlying processes. He has addressed the biological quality of aquatic ecosystems which develop in these systems, in terms of algae and invertebrate biodiversity. In this work he has addressed a wide range of pollutants, ranging from nutrients, over metals and organic micropollutants, to microplastics.

His work on microplastics has been focused on analytical techniques for their quantification and on occurrence, sources, transport, and fate of microplastics in natural and manmade environments. Today he leads a research team with among other some 15 PhD students and postdocs focusing on these topics. Microplastics are very challenging to analyze both from an analytical and practical point of view, and many of the devices used for sampling, and to some degree also analysis, are custom made by him and his group. Sampling is done in complex systems and under harsh conditions, bringing into play his mix of expertise, combining a strong theoretical background with a thorough understanding of practical problems when doing research in the field.
