= Koka Reservoir =

- Location within Ethiopia
- Location: South central Ethiopia
- Coordinates: 8°26′N 39°02′E
- Type: Reservoir
- Basin countries: Ethiopia
- Surface area: 180 km^{2} (69 sq mi)
- Surface elevation: 1,595 m (5,233 ft)

The Koka Reservoir (Amharic: ኮካ ሐይቅ; Oromo: Haroo Qooqaa) is a reservoir in south-central Ethiopia. It was created by the construction of the Koka Dam across the Awash River. The reservoir has an area of 180 square kilometres (69 sq mi).

== Geography ==
Located in the Misraq Shewa Zone of the Oromia Region, close to the capital and largest city of Ethiopia, Addis Ababa, the Koka Reservoir is popular with tourists and city-dwellers. There is a variety of wildlife and birds around the lake. The reservoir supports a fishing industry; according to the Ethiopian Department of Fisheries and Aquaculture, 625 tonnes (615 long tons; 689 short tons) of fish are landed each year, which the department estimates is either 52% or 89% of its sustainable amount. Both the reservoir and the dam are threatened by increasing sedimentation caused by environmental degradation as well as the invasive water hyacinth.

== Architecture ==
The Koka dam is concrete with a length of 458 metres (1,503 ft) and a maximum height of 47 metres (154 ft). The head utilized is 32 to 42 metres (105 to 138 ft). The primary contractor was Imprese Italiane all'Estero. The subcontractor who provided the equipment was Gruppo Industriale Elettro Meccaniche per Impiante all'Estero, and subcontractor for mounting the equipment and the erection of the transmission lines was Società Anonima Elettrificazione. Construction started in December 1957 and formally concluded on 4 May 1960; the budget was Eth$ 30,641,000. The power plant, with 132 kV transmission lines, began full operation on 28 August 1960. Addis Ababa is the primary benefactor. The total potential electric output is 110 GWh/year. The engineering plan was designed and implemented by Mekonnen Weldayohanes.
