= Ataye River =

River in Ethiopia

Location
- Country: Ethiopia
- Region: Amhara

Physical characteristics
- Source: Ethiopian Highlands
  - coordinates: 10°21′42″N 39°48′52″E
  - elevation: 3,038 m (9,967 ft)
- Mouth: Unknown River
  - coordinates: 10°19′39″N 40°00′48″E
  - elevation: 1,367 m (4,485 ft)
- Length: 26.4 km (16.4 mi)
- Basin size: 165 km^{2} (64 sq mi)
- Discharge
  - location: Mouth
  - average: 0.744 m^{3}/s (26.3 cu ft/s)
  - minimum: 0.034 m^{3}/s (1.2 cu ft/s)
  - maximum: 4.42 m^{3}/s (156 cu ft/s)

Basin features
- Progression: ? → Awash River → Lake Abbe
- River system: Awash Basin
- Cities: Ataye
- Population: 89,100

The Ataye is a river in central Ethiopia. It flows into the Awash River via an unnamed stretch of river.
