= Kabenna River =

River in Ethiopia

Kabenna River Kuba

Location
- Country: Ethiopia
- Regions: Amhara, Afar

Physical characteristics
- Source: Ethiopian Highlands
  - coordinates: 9°40′16″N 39°44′21″E
  - elevation: 3,344 m (10,971 ft)
- Mouth: Awash River
  - coordinates: 9°15′27″N 40°05′31″E
  - elevation: 748 m (2,454 ft)
- Length: 94 km (58 mi)
- Basin size: 1,357 km^{2} (524 sq mi)
- Discharge
  - location: Mouth
  - average: 4.05 m^{3}/s (143 cu ft/s)
  - minimum: 0.484 m^{3}/s (17.1 cu ft/s)
  - maximum: 22.5 m^{3}/s (790 cu ft/s)

Basin features
- Progression: Awash → Lake Abbe
- River system: Awash Basin
- Population: 228,000

The Kabenna is a river of central Ethiopia. It is a tributary of the Awash River to its west, having its source to the southwest of Ankobar. G.W.B. Huntingford speculates that it may be the same river as the Kuba, which is mentioned in the Futuh al-Habasha ("The Conquest of Abyssinia"), the narrative of Imam Ahmed ibn Ibrahim al-Ghazi's conquest of the Ethiopian Empire.

== See also ==
- List of rivers of Ethiopia
