= Hawadi River =

Location
- Country: Ethiopia
- Regions: Afar, Amhara

Physical characteristics
- Source: Ethiopian Highlands
  - coordinates: 9°50′08″N 40°02′58″E
  - elevation: 1,303 m (4,275 ft)
- Mouth: Awash River
  - coordinates: 9°51′30″N 40°15′21″E
  - elevation: 662 m (2,172 ft)
- Length: 48 km (30 mi)
- Basin size: 429 km^{2} (166 sq mi)
- Discharge
  - location: Mouth
  - average: 0.885 m^{3}/s (31.3 cu ft/s)
  - minimum: 0.083 m^{3}/s (2.9 cu ft/s)
  - maximum: 4.7 m^{3}/s (170 cu ft/s)

Basin features
- Progression: Awash → Lake Abbe
- River system: Awash Basin
- Population: 3,130

Hawadi River is a river of Ethiopia. It is a tributary of the Awash River.
