= Micropollutant =

Substance that can harm the environment if a very small amount is present

Micropollutants are substances that even at very low concentrations have adverse effects on different environmental matrices. They are an inhomogeneous group of anthroprogenic chemical compounds that is discharged by human to the environment. Commonly known micropollutants that might pose possible threats to ecological environments are, to name just a few:

- environmental persistent pharmaceutical pollutants and personal care products,
- pesticides,
- stimulants,
- persistent organic pollutants,
- and artificial sweeteners

To date, most of the scientists have identified wastewater treatment plants as the main source of micropollutants to aquatic ecosystems and/or adversely affect the extraction of potable water from raw water. Due to in many places drinking water is also extracted from surface waters, or the substances also reach the groundwater via the water, they are also found in raw water and must be laboriously removed by drinking water treatment. In addition, some of the substances are bioaccumulative, which means that they accumulate in animals or plants and thus also in the human food chain.

== Background ==
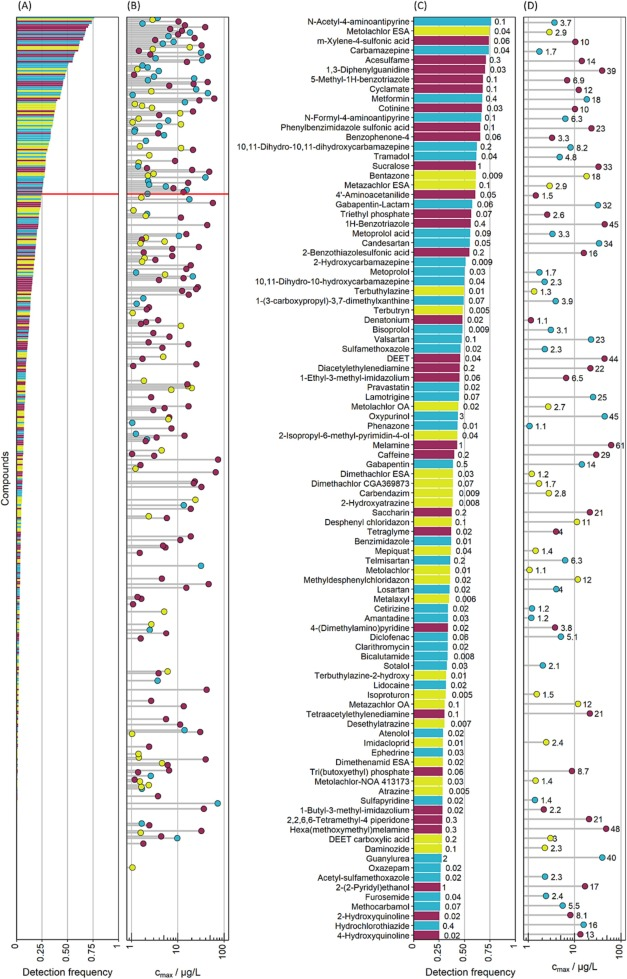
(A) Detection frequencies of the 504 trace substances. Red line is detection frequency of 25%. (B) Maximum concentrations (cmax) of all compounds with cmax > 1 μg/L. (C) Detection frequencies of 96 compounds detected in more than 25% of the samples. The number next to each bar represents the mean concentration (cmed) in μg/L. (D) Maximum concentrations (cmax > 1 μg/L) of compounds detected in more than 25% of the samples. The number next to each bar represents the maximum concentration (cmax) in μg/L. Pesticides and biocides are shown in green, pharmaceuticals in blue and other chemicals in purple.

It is estimated that there are currently around 235,000 individual chemical substances registered worldwide. A large number of these are released into wastewater by humans. If these are persistent, they remain during clarification in the wastewater and enter the environment. Some of them have ecotoxic relevant properties. In some cases, the chemical itself is not a concern, but its degradation products are.

This has been known for a longer time. As early as 1976, a study was published in which salicylic acid and clofibric acid were detected in the effluent of a sewage treatment plant in Kansas City. We currently know that there are well over 1,000 substances in wastewater that pose a risk. Many others have not yet been sufficiently researched in this regard.

In current studies of water quality in European rivers by the Helmholtz Centre for Environmental Research, 610 chemicals whose occurrence or problematic effects are known were examined in more detail and analyzed to determine whether and, if so, in what concentrations they occur in Europe's flowing waters. The evaluation of 445 samples from a total of 22 rivers showed that the researchers were able to detect a total of 504 of the 610 chemicals. In total, they found 229 pesticides and biocides, 175 pharmaceutical chemicals as well as surfactants, plastic and rubber additives, per- and polyfluoroalkyl substances (PFAS) and corrosion inhibitors. In 40 percent of the samples they detected up to 50 chemical substances, in another 41 percent between 51 and 100 chemicals. In 4 samples they were even able to detect more than 200 organic micropollutants. With 241 chemicals, they detected the most substances in a water sample from the Danube.

== Effect ==
The influences of micropollutants are varied. The best known are those of hormones that enter the water through the contraceptive pill. Several studies have shown that feminization occurs in an unusually high number of fish below discharges from sewage treatment plants, which has a negative impact on the population. One in five male smallmouth bass in U.S. rivers has developed female sexual characteristics. Estrogen-like artificial compounds such as the plasticizer bisphenol A also have this effect. There is evidence that this also applies to humans. Such substances are called endocrine disruptors. Other substances, such as benzotriazole, which is added to dishwasher detergent as corrosion protection for silver cutlery, are suspected of being carcinogenic in addition to acting as an endocrine disruptor in the concentrations found.

Another relevant factor is the danger posed by the spread of multi-resistant bacteria. There are two possible ways in which this can happen through wastewater. Firstly, by transporting already resistant strains into the receiving water due to inadequate treatment technology. The other possibility is the development of resistant cultures in the environment by introducing antibiotics into the water body. Preventing the entry of bacteria has long been used as a form of hygienic treatment using UV light or ozone, especially if the water is to be reused. Membrane systems such as membrane bioreactors or downstream ultrafiltration also serve this purpose. Depending on the intensity and technology, some micropollutants are also removed in addition to the bacteria. The extent to which membrane technologies with low energy consumption are able to deplete trace substances is being investigated.

== Legislation ==
Techniques for elimination of micropollutants via a so called fourth treatment stage during sewage treatment are implemented in Germany, Switzerland, Sweden and the Netherlands and tests are ongoing in several other countries. In Switzerland it has been enshrined in law since 2016.

Since 1 January 2025, there has been a recast of the Urban Waste Water Treatment Directive in the European Union, which requires the removal of a large proportion of micropollutants from wastewater. Due to the large number of amendments that have now been made, the directive was rewritten on November 27, 2024 as Directive (EU) 2024/3019, published in the EU Official Journal on December 12, and entered into force on January 1, 2025. The member states now have 31 months, i.e. until July 31, 2027, to adapt their national legislation to the new directive ("implementation of the directive").

The implementation of the framework guidelines is staggered until 2045, depending on the size of the sewage treatment plant and its population equivalents (PE). Sewage treatment plants with over 150,000 PE have priority and should be adapted immediately, as a significant proportion of the pollution comes from them followed by wastewater treatment plants with 10,000 to 150,000 PE that discharge into coastal waters or sensitive waters. The latter concerns waters with a low dilution ratio, waters from which drinking water is obtained and those that are coastal waters, or those used as bathing waters or used for mussel farming. Member States will be given the option not to apply fourth treatment in these areas if a risk assessment shows that there is no potential risk from micropollutants to human health and/or the environment.

== Removal of micropollutants ==
Block diagram of a so-called Ulm process with powdered activated carbon (PAC)

Due to the large number of substances with very different chemical and physical properties, the removal of these substances is difficult. Three techniques and cominationes of them have been established so far. Two remove the contaminants with the help of activated carbon (PAC (Powdered Activated Carbon), GAC (Granulated Activated Carbon)) and one with ozone.

In addition to that a large number of techniques are still in experimental stage. These include for example processes that work with plasma or ultrasound, so-called AOP processes, applications with zeolites and cyclodextrins, membrane processes or photocatalysis.

== See also ==
- Drug pollution
- Plastic particle water pollution
- Environmental impact of silver nanoparticles
- Environmental persistent pharmaceutical pollutant
- Water pollution
