= Logiya River =

- Location within Ethiopia

Location
- Country: Ethiopia
- Regions: Afar, Amhara

Physical characteristics
- Source: Ethiopian Highlands
  - coordinates: 11°42′21″N 39°33′14″E
  - elevation: 3,392 metres (11,129 ft)
- Mouth: Awash River
  - location: Near Logiya
  - coordinates: 11°43′09″N 40°59′58″E
  - elevation: 391 metres (1,283 ft)
- Length: 212 km (132 mi)
- Basin size: 3,520 km^{2} (1,360 sq mi)
- Discharge
  - location: Mouth
  - average: 11.8 m^{3}/s (420 cu ft/s)
  - minimum: 1.09 m^{3}/s (38 cu ft/s)
  - maximum: 55.1 m^{3}/s (1,950 cu ft/s)

Basin features
- Progression: Awash → Lake Abbe
- River system: Awash Basin
- Cities: Logiya
- Population: 140,000

The Logiya, or Logia, is a river of east-central Ethiopia, a left tributary of the Awash River.

== Course ==
The Logiya rises in the Ethiopian Highlands, then flows eastwards to join the Awash near Semera, below the Tendaho Dam. It runs through flat lowland areas with mountainous boundaries in the Great Rift Valley of northeastern Ethiopia.

== Watershed ==
The Logiya watershed is part of the Lower Awash River Basin (LARB). The upper part is in the North Wollo Zone of the Amhara Region. Lower down it is in the Afar Region. The Logiya watershed lies to the west of the Awash River, and covers an area of 3,520 km^{2} (1,360 sq mi). Elevations range from 384 to 2,487 metres (1,260 to 8,159 ft) above sea level. The average altitude is 890.6 metres (2,922 ft) above sea level. Mean annual temperature is 20.8 °C (69.4 °F) in the highest parts and 29 °C (84 °F) in the lower part.

The watershed is mainly arid lowlands, and has fluctuating temperature and rainfall. Ground cover includes grass steppe, shrub, tree steppe and bare soil with very sparse vegetation. The watershed suffers from severe degradation of the soil and desertification. However, particularly in the upper regions during the periods of high rainfall, it may be subject to flooding.

== Hydrology ==
The main rainy season is from June to September. The dry season is from October to January and the small rainy season is from February to May. Mean annual precipitation varies from 1,600 millimetres (63 in) in the highlands to 160 millimetres (6.3 in) in the lowlands.

== See also ==
- List of rivers of Ethiopia

== Sources ==
- Jilo, Nura Boru; Gebremariam, Bogale; Harka, Arus Edo; Woldemariam, Gezahegn Weldu; Behulu, Fiseha (2019), "Evaluation of the Impacts of Climate Change on Sediment Yield from the Logiya Watershed, Lower Awash Basin, Ethiopia", Hydrology, 6 (3): 81, doi:10.3390/hydrology6030081
- "Way: Logiya (704159531)", OpenStreetMap
- Argaw, Yidenkachew (June 2008), Flood Frequency Analysis for Lower Awash Subbasin [tributaries from Northern Wollo High Lands] using Swat 2005 Model (PDF) (Thesis), Addis Ababa University
