= Adama–Awash Expressway =

Toll road connecting Adama and Awash in Ethiopia

Addis Ababa–Adama Expressway

Route information
- Length: 130 km (81 mi)

Location
- Country: Ethiopia

Highway system
- Transport in Ethiopia

The Adama–Awash Expressway is a national route in Ethiopia currently under construction designed to link the cities of Adama (also known as Nazret) and Awash, located in the central region of the country. Upon completion, the Adama–Awash Expressway will span a total length of 130 kilometers, contributing significantly to the expansion and modernization of Ethiopia's road network. The development is expected to have a positive impact on the country's economic growth, trade, and social development, while also improving travel times and overall transportation safety.

== Route ==
As it approaches Adama, it will also start going north eastwards until it reaches a road called Adama-, which runs from there to Awash. That area is characterized by a long valley with a gently sloping surface descending from 1500m above sea level at Adama down to 900m at the foot of Mount Awash. There are stupendous mountains around it whose heights could rise up to 3000m; hence this contrast really stands out geographically. In routing itself this expressway will run parallel to route 1 and existing railway line towards Dire Dawa and eventually to port city Djibouti. The road will act as a hub in terms of connecting continents increasing business transactions and reducing the time taken while transporting goods between cities and their global markets.

== History and future ==
The construction work started on a 60 km section on May 30, 2021, and it will be completed in mid-2025 with an aim of enhancing connectivity and simplifying transportation between important economic centers. The successful implementation of this program will considerably affect Ethiopia's economic growth, trade increase and regional integration.
