= Dukem River =

River in Ethiopia

Dukem River Durkham

Location
- Country: Ethiopia
- Regions: Oromia, Addis Ababa

Physical characteristics
- Source: Ethiopian Highlands
  - location: Mount Yarar
  - coordinates: 8°53′58″N 38°57′37″E
  - elevation: 2,990 m (9,810 ft)
- Mouth: Awash River
  - coordinates: 8°34′52″N 38°46′38″E
  - elevation: 1,784 m (5,853 ft)
- Length: 47 km (29 mi)
- Basin size: 342 km^{2} (132 sq mi)
- Discharge
  - location: Mouth
  - average: 1.97 m^{3}/s (70 cu ft/s)
  - minimum: 0.368 m^{3}/s (13.0 cu ft/s)
  - maximum: 8.68 m^{3}/s (307 cu ft/s)

Basin features
- Progression: Awash → Lake Abbe
- River system: Awash Basin
- Population: 196,000

Dukem River is a river of central Ethiopia. It is the namesake of the town Dukem. It is a tributary of the Awash River.

== See also ==
- Rivers of Ethiopia
