= Sex effects of water pollution =

Sex is influenced by water pollutants that are encountered in everyday life. These sources of water can range from the simplicity of a water fountain to the entirety of the oceans. The pollutants within the water range from endocrine disruptor chemicals (EDCs) in birth control to Bisphenol A (BPA). Foreign substances such as chemical pollutants that cause an alteration of sex have been found in growing prevalence in the circulating waters of the world. These pollutants have affected not only humans, but also animals in contact with the pollutants.

== Endocrine disruptor chemicals ==
Endocrine disruptor chemicals (EDCs) are a type of chemical that directly influences sex hormones. They have acquired these names due to the fact that they are anti-estrogens and anti-androgens. By inhibiting the function of these hormones, fertility decreases, and an imbalance of such hormones has been shown to cause feminizing effects in males. This is not only a human issue, but has become increasingly noticeable in fish populations worldwide. Scientists believe that these chemicals present in the water supply leads to increasing feminizing effects in male fish. Estrogens accumulate in body fat and tissue, and because of the cycle of the food chain, the artificial estrogens/EDCs bioaccumulate as they rise up the different levels of the food chain.

EDCs are present in the environment, whether naturally or artificially. Although the EDCs from birth control are obviously causing a great effect on the humans, it turns out that, in the United States, the estrogens given to livestock are even more prevalent.

== Pollutants and their source of origin ==
=== Pharmaceuticals ===
Sex-altering pollutants come from many sources. One source that is becoming more visible is water pollution through pharmaceuticals. Pharmaceutical products may contain microscopic pollutants that imitate the chemical structure of hormones found in living organisms. These compounds are called Endocrine Disrupting Chemicals. They usually mimic the chemical structures of estrogens and androgens. The sources of these artificial EDCs are surprisingly common in human production and usage of many household and industrial products. For example, EDCs such as parabens, phthalates, and triclosans can be found in everyday household items such as generic shampoos, conditioners, soaps, perfumes, makeup, and lotions. EDCs are either applied to the skin and are absorbed, ingested and then excreted in urine, or are washed off in the shower or sink and have been documented in multiple water analyses. Below are some of the most commonly tested, used, and analyzed EDCs found in pharmaceuticals and personal care products:

- Parabens: inhibit the growth of yeasts, molds, and bacteria in cosmetic products and can be found in deodorants, facial scrubs, make up, lotions, and cleansers. Parabens are also an estrogen mimicker and are chemically the same structure.
- Phthalates: Phthalates are used in cosmetics as "plasticizing" agents to make a substance more pliable such as in fingernail polish and hairspray. They act as estrogen and bind to receptors in the cell to induce estrogenic activity within an organism.
- Triclosans: operate as antimicrobials and can be found in toothpaste, cosmetic products, and many soaps. Triclosans exhibit behaviors that are representative of estrogen and androgen, working in a complex nature to interact with both hormonal receptors

Aside from these microscopic EDCs, some of the other more common types of pharmaceuticals found in water analyses are "anti-depressants, anti-seizure drugs, and one that is very well known: birth control."

=== Industry and farming ===
However, pharmaceuticals are not the largest contributor to the growing amount of gender-altering pollution in the water. Scientists at the University of California, San Francisco (UCSF) stated that there are many other sources of chemicals like the ones found in various pharmaceuticals that produce the same effects. "Crop fertilizers along with dairy cows, and various industrial chemicals like BPA" are increasingly seen as a source for pollution causing certain specific effects in those who consume them or products that are manufactured from them. Specifically shifting to industrial chemicals, when they, along with other products containing these chemicals, are disposed of, they end up in landfills. Runoff from said landfills eventually finds its way to a larger source of water and the contamination begins.

=== Fossil fuels and organics ===
Another source from which pollutants originate is fossil fuel combustion. The organic pollutants and trace metals released into the air from this combustion end up in the oceans and influence the chemistry of the ocean. One specific process that has a great impact on the global nitrogen cycle which affects ocean climate, the Haber-Bosch process, is used for an agricultural fertilizer.

=== Humans ===
There are also humans. The chemicals that alter gender are constantly produced and excreted by a human being on a normal everyday basis. Along with this, pregnant women contain greater amounts of the chemicals thus releasing greater amounts of it with every excretion. Because of this, one can see that the source of gender-altering pollutants is not natural, but due to man-made chemicals that, globally, are being released.

== Circulation of pollutants ==
Chemicals such as EDCs and artificial estrogens are in constant circulation around the planet through a variety of mediums. Humans have become a main contributor to the toxic buildup of these chemicals in our ecosystem. Main sources of drinking water, such as rivers, lakes, streams, and eventually the ocean are just a few of such mediums that carry these chemicals from place to place. Most chemical exposure to impoverished people around the world who live in rural areas is linked to their exposure to polluted water sources.

The process of the EDCs entering the water source all begins with a source. Whether it comes from an industrial plant, pharmaceutical, or human source, it eventually finds its way to a larger water source, usually in the form of a waste product. The Environmental Protection Agency (EPA) has documented the amount of pharmaceuticals released into the environment from manufacturing plants, however, this documentation is not as prevalent on a household level. There are some on-going efforts to attempt to minimize this pollution. For example, 80 percent of pharmacies in Clark County, Washington, have contributed to efforts emphasizing the safe disposal of noncontrolled drugs. Attempts to control water pollution are gaining support as pollution gradually becomes more visible. However, these efforts are still in the process of being implemented on a large scale. The polluted water is then sent to a number of places.

=== Waste management ===
One possibility is that the water is sent to a waste management facility to be treated and then recirculated. However, experts have found that sewage treatment does not remove these chemicals completely from drinking supplies. Any type of water that is flushed down the shower, toilet, or sink usually carries with it some sort of EDC. These drains lead to pipes that lead to a waste water management plant. A typical waste water treatment plant involves a multiple step process of water cleaning but due to the microscopic size of EDC particles, it usually is not a 100% successful process. For example, Boulder, Colorado Waste Water Management receives water in inceptor pipes, which lead into larger holding pools at the facility. The typical treatment usually lasts between 12 and 24 hours and consists of three main treatment processes. First, physical treatments remove solid and organic materials from the waste water. Then, microbiological treatments follow. Bacteria in these waste tanks feed on carbon and nitrogenous compounds left in the sewage. And finally, the water is treated with ultraviolet blue light to disinfect the remaining water. The effluent water is feed back into local creeks, streams, and freshwater resources. This basic waste water treatment plan is effective in targeting larger contaminants, however, it is ineffective in removing microscopic EDCs. Thus, EDC micro-pollution is causing a toxic buildup of chemical soups in freshwater habitats.

In response to this, the water industry has stated that there is no evidence of a risk to overall health as a result of exposure to these chemicals. However, the Food and Drug Administration (FDA) states in its review of water pollution that many contaminants survive wastewater treatment and biodegradation, and are detectable in the environment. Therefore, the tainted source is recycled through a community, exposing more people and releasing more chemicals along the way.

=== Water cycle ===
A second source of circulation is water as it follows its natural path through the water cycle. The water cycle, put simply, represents the path that water takes as it circulates around planet earth. It follows a series of stages in which the water changes state multiple times until it finally falls back to earth where it will once again be circulated. In the water cycle, both organic and inorganic pollutants are biodegraded or filtered out whereas they no longer present much of a threat. This is also true for small amounts of chemicals present in the water. However, when there are very large amounts of chemicals, organic or inorganic, present in the water as it cycles through the atmosphere, harmful effects can be seen in areas where this water falls as precipitation. This precipitation re-enters the ongoing circulation of water pollution.

=== Ocean and marine life ===
Another path in which the water can circulate is by flowing directly to the ocean. Pollutants are prevalent in coastal and open-ocean waters as contaminated water flows from point sources to the sea. These pollutants are then distributed globally due to the circulation of the ocean currents and migration of exposed marine life. This becomes an explanation of how the chemicals, once again, find their way to a human consumer. Marine wildlife in a polluted area exists in and consumes contaminated water daily. When it is harvested, it has accumulated an amount of harmful chemicals/EDCs relatively high to that compared to ambient ocean levels. This is then passed on to consumers of the seafood: humans, whereas the chemicals bioaccumulate in their bodies eventually causing sex-related health problems.

== Effects of pollutants on sex ==
These chemicals have an effect on the sex of many humans because of constant exposure. The pollutants found in the water have been observed in many studies that produce concrete data describing the effects they have on the hormones in both males and females. Studies have been conducted on animals, but the observed trends are also associated with effects noticed in humans. Scientists observing EDCs in women's blood found that these chemicals mimic human hormones and trigger changes in the sex-determining process of unborn children. Some scientists suggest that this hormonal influence on the sex-determining process has led to a decrease in the male/female ratio. Other effects directly influencing the sex of an individual include a decrease in number and quality of sperm and increased deficiency in a male's reproductive system.

Specifically looking at the effects of EDCs on sperm, these chemicals cause a premature release of a chemical that the sperm cells use to penetrate the egg's outer layer. Results collected from a study help to explain why the sperm act the way they do. In respect to the deficiency of the male's reproductive system, these chemicals begin affecting a male as early as birth. As the testes are developing, an occurrence taking place early in the development process, a specific type of cells, Sertoli cells, differentiates. During this period, exposure to an EDC such as oestrogen causes a reduction in Sertoli cells produced. The reduction of Sertoli cells causes a decrease in the production of sperm thus rendering the male reproductive system less effective. EDCs have also been linked to early puberty, infertility, and developmental defects. Not only have these effects been found in human subjects, but aquatic life has also been studied as these animals are in direct contact with EDCs as a part of their lifestyle. Populations of fish have been largely affected by EDC's prevalence in their native ecosystems.

=== Aquatic life ===
- A study published in 2008 in Japan examined the effects of EDCs from personal care products on a local river biome. The effect of triclosan indicated the inhibition of growth of multiple species including algae, protozoa, crustaceans, bacteria, and amphibians. Further evidence of EDC presence is revealed by surveys of freshwater, estuarine, and marine ecosystems that also pose great consequences to the health of fish. Estrogen and androgen mimickers create endocrine imbalances in fish populations that rely on hormone communication for reproduction and maturation. A buildup of EDCs in streams, lakes, and rivers creates confusion in the hormone vitellogenin, the reproductive hormone in fish. According to a review published by the U.S. Environmental Protection Agency, when fish were exposed to a variety of estrogen and androgen mimickers, vitellogenin communication was skewed yielding reduced egg production, skewed sex ratio, reduced male gonadosomatic index (sperm production), decreased sexual behavior in males and increased physical deformities in a variety of fish species.

== Solutions ==
=== Water filtration technology ===
In an effort to better filter these trace pollutants out of effluent water leaving waste management plants, studies conducted by Westerhoff et al. and Schafer et al. explore the water filtration systems that are best at removal of EDCs from effluent waters. They found that Powdered Activated Carbon (PAC), membrane filtration (nonfiltration and biofiltration), and reverse osmosis were the best at removal of EDCs.

- Powdered activated carbon (PAC): PAC is made from organic matter that has a high carbon content such as wood, coal, and coconuts. The carbon source is treated to have a large surface area with many microscopic pores and added in high content to water in the early stages of water treatment. The carbon absorbs toxins because of its molecular attraction and desire to adhere to organic charged molecules.
- Membrane filtration: Membrane filtration involves the use of organic and inorganic membranes that filter out different sized molecules based on molecular characteristics.
- Reverse osmosis: Reverse osmosis is similar to membrane filtration. It uses reverse osmotic pressure which encourages water to filter from high concentration of contamination to low concentrations of contamination through added pressure. The water is passed through a membrane that solely allows the passing of water, forcing contaminants and toxins to be rejected from the filtration process.
