= Dispersive mass transfer =

Dispersive mass transfer, in fluid dynamics, is the spreading of mass from highly concentrated areas to less concentrated areas. It is one form of mass transfer.

Dispersive mass flux is analogous to diffusion, and it can also be described using Fick's first law:

$$J = -E \frac{dc}{dx},$$

where c is mass concentration of the species being dispersed, E is the dispersion coefficient, and x is the position in the direction of the concentration gradient. Dispersion can be differentiated from diffusion in that it is caused by non-ideal flow patterns (i.e. deviations from plug flow) and is a macroscopic phenomenon, whereas diffusion is caused by random molecular motions (i.e. Brownian motion) and is a microscopic phenomenon. Dispersion is often more significant than diffusion in convection-diffusion problems. The dispersion coefficient is frequently modeled as the product of the fluid velocity, U, and some characteristic length scale, α:

$$E = \alpha U.$$
