= Contaminants of emerging concern =

Type of pollutants in water quality research

Contaminants of emerging concern (CEC) is a term used by water quality professionals to describe pollutants that have been detected in environmental monitoring samples, that may cause ecological or human health impacts, and typically are not regulated under current environmental laws. Sources of these pollutants include agriculture, urban runoff and ordinary household products (such as soaps and disinfectants) and pharmaceuticals that are disposed to sewage treatment plants and subsequently discharged to surface waters.

CEC include different substances like pharmaceuticals, personal care products, industrial byproducts, and agricultural chemicals. These substances often bypass regular detection and treatment processes, leading to their unintended persistence in the environment. The complexity of CEC arises not only from their different chemical nature but also from the complex ways they interact with ecosystems and human health. As such, they are the focus of increasing examination by researchers, policymakers, and public health officials who want to understand their long-term effects and develop effective interventions. Global initiatives, like those from the World Health Organization (WHO) and the United States Environmental Protection Agency (US EPA), emphasize the need to create international standards and effective environmental policies to address the challenges posed by CEC. Public awareness and advocacy play crucial roles in driving the research agenda and policy development for CEC, highlighting the need for updated manufacturing practices and developing more remediation and detection methods.

== History and background ==
The concept of CEC gained significant attention in the early 21st century as advances in analytical techniques such as liquid chromatography - mass spectrometry (LC-MS) and gas chromatography - mass spectrometry (GC-MS) allowed for the detection of these substances at trace levels in various environmental matrices. These sophisticated tools enabled scientists to detect trace concentrations of previously overlooked chemicals in various environmental matrices including wastewater, surface water, groundwater and even drinking water samples. The increased awareness of CEC is partly due to their abundant presence in wastewater, surface water, groundwater, and drinking water, often because of urbanization, industrial activities, and the widespread use of pharmaceuticals and personal care products. The recognition of the potential risks posed by CEC has led to a growing body of research aimed at understanding their sources, fate, and effects in the environment, as well as the development of strategies for their management and removal.

== Past events ==
- In the 19th and early 20th centuries asbestos was used in many products and in building construction and was not considered a threat to human health or the environment. Deaths and lung problems caused by asbestos were first documented in the early 20th century. The first regulations of the asbestos industry were published in the UK in the 1930s. Regulation of asbestos in the US did not occur until the 1980s.
- In the 1970s there was a serious issue with the water treatment infrastructure of some US states, notably in Southern California with water sourced from the Sacramento–San Joaquin River Delta. Water was being disinfected for domestic use through chlorine treatment, which was effective for killing microbial contaminants and bacteria, but in some cases, it reacted with runoff chemicals and organic matter to form trihalomethanes (THMs). Research done in the subsequent years began to suggest the carcinogenic and harmful nature of this category of compounds. EPA issued its first standard for THMs, applicable to public water systems, in 1979, and more stringent standards in 1998 and 2006.
- Rapid industry changes also make the treatment and regulation of CEC particularly challenging. For instance, the replacing substance (GenX), for the recently regulated perfluorooctanoic acid (PFOA), a PFAS, had a more detrimental environmental impact, resulting in the subsequently banning of GenX as well. Hence, there is a pressing need for the treatment and management of CEC to keep up with global trends.

== Classification ==
For a compound to be recognized as an emerging contaminant it has to meet at least two requirements:

1. Adverse human health effects have been associated with a compound.
2. There is an established relationship between the positive and negative effect(s) of the compound.

Emerging contaminants are those which have not previously been detected through water quality analysis, or have been found in small concentrations with uncertainty as to their effects. The risk they pose to human or environmental health is not fully understood.

== Contaminant classes ==
Contaminants of emerging concern (CEC) can be broadly classed into several categories of chemicals such as pharmaceuticals and personal care products, cyanotoxins, nanoparticles, and flame retardants, among others. However, these classifications are constantly changing as new contaminants (or effects) are discovered and emerging contaminants from past years become less of a priority. These contaminants can generally be categorized as truly "new" contaminants that have only recently been discovered and researched, contaminants that were known about but their environmental effects were not fully understood, or "old" contaminants that have new information arising regarding their risks.

=== Pharmaceuticals ===
Pharmaceuticals are gaining more attention as Contaminants of emerging concern (CECs) because of their continual release into the environment, their persistence and their general lack of regulation. These compounds are often present at low concentrations in water bodies and little is currently known about their environmental and health effects from chronic exposure; pharmaceuticals are only now becoming a focus in toxicology due to improved analytical techniques that allow very low concentrations to be detected. The main source of pharmaceutical pollution in the environment is effluent from wastewater treatment plants, aquaculture and agricultural runoffs.

Once present in the environment, pharmaceuticals can cause long-term ecological and health effects such as synthetic estrogens from contraceptives that have led to feminization in male fish, and anti-inflammatory drugs Despite their ubiquity in the environment, pharmaceuticals remain largely unregulated in most environmental statutes.

=== Personal care products ===
Personal care products often contain a complex mixture of chemicals such as preservatives (e.g., parabens), UV filters (e.g., oxybenzone), plasticizers (e.g., phthalates), antimicrobials (e.g., triclosan), fragrances, and colorants. Many of these compounds are synthesized chemicals that are not typically found in nature. Chemicals from personal care products can enter the environment through various pathways. After use, they are often washed down the drain and can end up in the wastewater stream. These substances are not all completely removed by conventional wastewater treatment processes, leading to their release into natural water bodies. Some of these chemicals are persistent in the environment and can bioaccumulate in the tissues of organisms, potentially causing ecological disruptions. They can also have endocrine-disrupting properties that interfere with the hormonal systems of wildlife and humans.

=== Cyanotoxins ===
In recent years, there has been an increase of cyanobacterial blooms due to the eutrophication (or increase in nutrient levels) of surface waters around the world. Increases in certain nutrients, such as nitrogen and phosphorus, are linked to fertilizer runoff from agricultural fields, and are also found in certain products, such as detergents, in urban spaces. These blooms can release toxins that can decrease water quality and are a risk to human and wildlife health. Additionally, there are a lack of regulations regarding the maximum contaminant levels (MCL) allowed in drinking water sources. Cyanotoxins can have both acute and chronic toxic effects, and there are often many consequences for the health of the environment where these blooms occur.

=== Industrial chemicals ===
Industrial chemicals from various industries produce harmful chemicals that are known to cause harm to human health and the environment. Common industrial chemicals, like 1,4-Dioxanes, Perfluorooctane sulfonate (PFOS) and Perfluorooctanoic acid (PFOA), are commonly found in various water sources.

=== Nanomaterials ===
Nanomaterials include carbon-based materials, metal oxides, metals, and quantum dots. Nanomaterials can enter the environment during their manufacturing, consumer use, or disposal. Due to their small size, nanomaterials behave differently than larger particles. They have a high surface area to volume ratio, which can lead to increased reactivity and the potential to transport throughout the environment. Nanomaterials are challenging to detect and monitor due to their size and the absence of standardized methods for measuring their presence and concentration in various media.

== Sources and pathways ==
=== Agricultural runoff ===
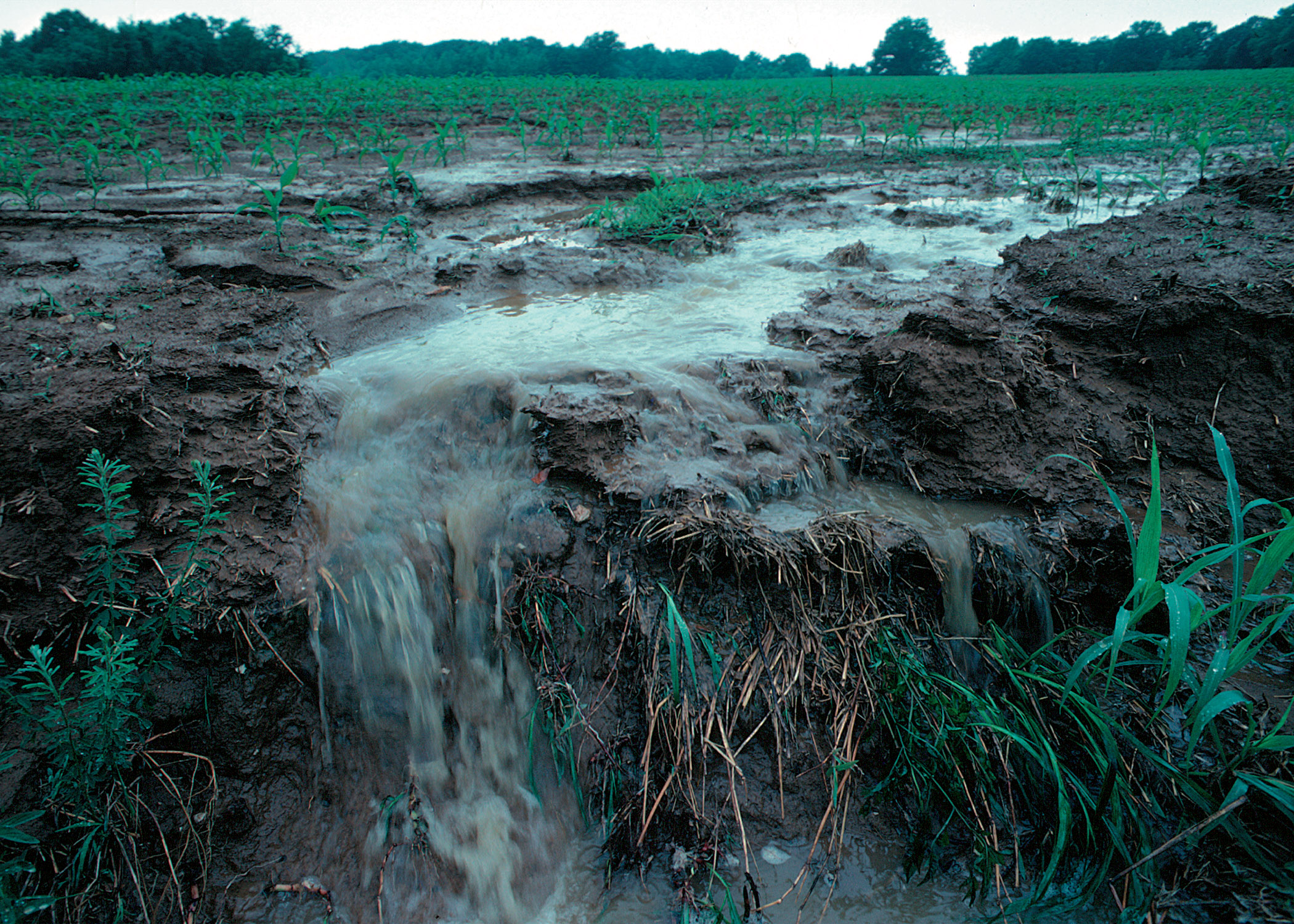
Agricultural runoff carrying CEC into the environment

Agricultural runoff is a major pathway through which CEC enter the environment. Compounds like pesticides and pharmaceuticals from fertilizers are carried by water from farms into their surrounding areas soil and water bodies. Then runoff happens after rainfall or irrigation, which causes an influx of chemicals to leak out of the soil where they were dumped and into rivers, lakes, and groundwater. The runoff can contain a CEC's which are not regulated or whose environmental impacts are not well understood, contributing to the pollution of aquatic ecosystems, and potentially affecting human water sources. A significant challenge is monitoring levels of CEC in bodies of water. A nationwide survey revealed that soil erosion, nutrient loss, and pesticide runoff from America's vast agricultural lands are leading causes of water quality pollution. Approximately 46% of rivers and streams in the United States have conditions which are harmful to aquatic life. Additionally, only about 28% of these water bodies are rated as 'healthy' based on their biological communities.

=== Industrial discharge ===
Industrial discharge is when waste products are released into the environment from manufacturing and chemical processing facilities. This waste can include a wide variety of CEC like heavy metals, solvents, and various organic compounds that are not regularly detected for or removed by standard treatment processes. These contaminants can accumulate in sediments and biota, posing risks to aquatic life and human health. The complexity and diversity of industrial discharge requires advanced treatment technologies and stricter regulatory frameworks to prevent CEC from contaminating the environment. Advanced oxidation processes and membrane technologies have been researched and shown to reduce CEC from industrial discharge, however there is an excessive cost to retrofit existing treatment facilities with this technology.

=== Urban runoff ===
Urban runoff is rainwater that runs through streets, gardens, and other urban surfaces, picking up various pollutants along the way. These pollutants can include CEC like microplastics from synthetic materials, polycyclic aromatic hydrocarbons (PAHs) from vehicle exhausts, and pharmaceuticals from improperly disposed medications. This untreated runoff can enter storm drains and eventually discharge into natural water bodies, often bypassing wastewater treatment facilities and leading to their accumulation in the environment, where they can cause harm to wildlife and potentially enter the human food chain. Permeable pavements and rain gardens are being implemented and tested in some urban areas to mitigate the effects of runoff, helping to filter pollutants before they reach the water system.

=== Wastewater treatment plants ===
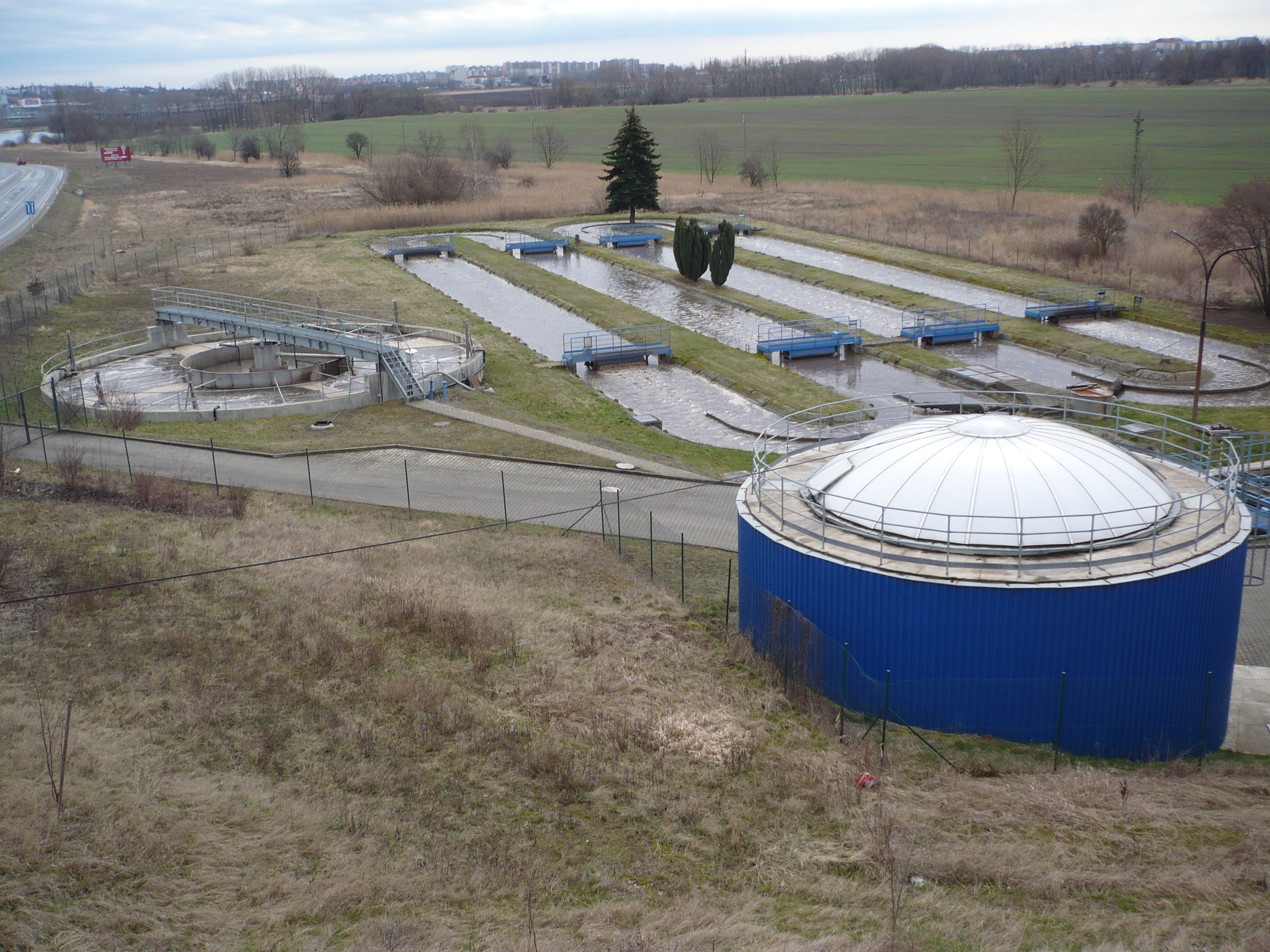
Wastewater treatment plant removing contaminants from industrial wastewater

Wastewater treatment plants (WWTPs) are designed to remove contaminants from domestic and industrial wastewater before it is released into the environment. However, some WWTPs, particularly older or under-resourced ones are not equipped to effectively remove all CEC, such as advanced pharmaceuticals, personal care product ingredients, and certain types of industrial chemicals. These substances can pass through the treatment process and enter aquatic ecosystems, which creates a challenge for water treatment technology and emphasizes the need for ongoing research and infrastructure improvement to address the removal of CEC from wastewater. Advances like tertiary treatment stages, which incorporate advanced filtration and chemical removal techniques, are being tested to address the presence of CEC in waste, though widespread implementation is yet to be seen due to novelty, cost, and logistical challenges.

== Environmental and health impacts ==
=== Relation between compound and effects ===
There is an overlap of many anthropogenically sourced chemicals that humans are exposed to regularly. This makes it difficult to attribute negative health causality to a specific, isolated compound. EPA manages a Contaminant Candidate List to review substances that may need to be controlled in public water systems. EPA has also listed twelve contaminants of emerging concern at federal facilities, with ranging origins, health effects, and means of exposure. The twelve listed contaminants are as follows: Trichloropropane (TCP), Dioxane, Trinitrotoluene (TNT), Dinitrotoluene, Hexahydro-trinitro-triazane (RDX), N-nitroso-dimethylamine (NDMA), Perchlorate, Polybrominated biphenyls (PBBs), Tungsten, Polybrominated diphenyl ethers (PBDEs) and Nanomaterials.

=== Selected compounds listed as emerging contaminants ===
The NORMAN network enhances the exchange of information on emerging environmental substances. A Suspect List Exchange (SLE) has been created to allow sharing of the many potential contaminants of emerging concern. The list contains more than 100,000 chemicals.

Table 1 is a summary of emerging contaminants currently listed on one EPA website and a review article. Detailed use and health risk of commonly identified CEC are listed in the table below.

Compound	Uses	Where it is Found	Health Risks
Trichloropropane (TCP)	Chemical intermediate, solvent, and cleaning product	TCPs are denser than water, so they sink to the bottom of aquifers and contaminate them, they also have a low capacity to be absorbed organically and leach into soil or evaporate, contaminating the air	Considered a likely carcinogen by NOAA
Dioxane	Stabilizer of chlorinated solvents, manufacturing of PET, manufacturing by-product	Often at industrial sites, and they move rapidly from soil to groundwater, although it was phased out as part of the Montreal Protocol it is very resistant to bio-degradation and has been found at over 34 EPA sites	Rapid disruption of lung, liver, kidney, spleen, colon, and muscle tissue, may be toxic to developing fetuses and is a potential carcinogen
Trinitrotoluene (TNT)	Pure explosive, military and underwater blasting	Major contaminant of groundwater and soils	Listed as cancer-causing by Office of Environmental Health, may cause carcinoma and bladder papilloma
Dinitrotoluene	Intermediate to form TNT, explosive	Found in surface water, groundwater, and soil at hazardous waste sites, and may be released into the air as dust or aerosols	Considered a hepatocarcinogen and may cause ischemic heart disease, hepatobiliary cancer, and urothelial and renal cell cancers
Hexahydro-trinitro-triazane (RDX)	Military explosive	Exists as particulate matter in the atmosphere, easily leaches into groundwater and aquifers from soil, does not readily evaporate from water	Decreased body weight, kidney and liver damage, possible carcinoma, insomnia, nausea, and tremor
Nanomaterials	Broad classification of ultrafine particulate matter used in more than 1,800 consumer products and biomedical applications	Released as consumer waste or spillage, may be airborne, found in food, or in many diverse industrial processes	May translocate into the circulatory system primarily through the lungs, exposing the body to an accumulation of compounds in the liver, spleen, kidney, and brain
N-nitroso-dimethylamine (NDMA)	Formed in the production of antioxidants, additives, softeners, and rocket fuel, and an unintended byproduct of the chlorination of waste and drinking water at treatment facilities	Broken down quickly when released into the air, but highly mobile when released into soil and will likely leach into groundwater, humans may be exposed by drinking contaminated water, ingesting contaminated food, or using products that contain NDMA	Probable carcinogen, evidence of liver damage, reduced function of kidneys and lungs
Perchlorate	Manufacturing and combustion of solid rocket propellants, munitions, fireworks, airbag initiators, and flares	Highly soluble in water so it can greatly accumulate in groundwater, also accumulates in some food crop leaves and milk	Eye, skin, and respiratory irritation and in high volumes corrosion. Potentially disrupts thyroid hormones
Perfluoro-octane sulfonate (PFOS) and Perfluorooctanoic acid (PFOA)	Used in additives and coatings, non-stick cookware, waterproof clothing, cardboard packaging, wire casing, and resistant tubing	During manufacturing, the compounds were released into the surrounding air, ground, and water, is resistant to typical environmental degradation processes and have been shown to bioaccumulate, found in oceans and Arctic, meaning they have a high capacity for transport	World Health Organization categorized possible carcinogen, may cause high cholesterol, increased liver enzymes, and adverse reproductive and developmental effects
Polybrominated biphenyls (PBBs)	Flame retardant	Detected in the air, sediments, surface water, fish and other marine animals, they do not dissolve so they are not mobile in water but are volatile and prevalent in the atmosphere	Classified by International Agency for Research on Cancer as likely carcinogenic, neurotoxic, and thyroid, liver, and kidney toxicity as well as an endocrine disruptor
Polybrominated diphenyl ethers (PBDEs)	Flame retardant and used in plastics, furniture, and other household products	Enter the environment through emissions, and has been detected in air, sediments, surface water, fish and other marine animals	Shown to be an endocrine disruptor as well as carcinogenic, also, may cause neural, liver, pancreatic, and thyroid toxicity
Tungsten	A naturally occurring element which exists in various household products and military manufacturing	Tungsten is water-soluble under certain conditions and may be found in dangerous quantities in water sources	May cause respiratory complications, and investigated as a potential carcinogen by the CDC
Diclofenac	Anti-inflammatory drug	Can be found in water treatment plant (WTP) effluents. Reported to be found in coastal waters as well	In large quantities can cause serious gastrointestinal toxicity. Severe ecotoxicity to selected breeds of animals
Bisphenol A (BPA)	Industrial plastic production (polycarbonate plastics and epoxy resins)	Found to accumulate in water treatment plant (WTP) effluents	BPA is cytotoxic and mutagenic. It exerts various adverse effects on reproductive, immune, endocrine and nervous systems
Sulfamethoxazole (SMX)	Antibiotics	Reported to be found in various freshwater systems	Common side effects include nausea, vomiting, loss of appetite, and skin rashes. It is a sulfonamide and bacteriostatic
Carbamazepine	Anticonvulsant	Reported to be found in various freshwater systems and WTP effluents.	Common side effects include nausea and drowsiness. Serious side effects may include skin rashes, decreased bone marrow function, suicidal thoughts, or confusion.

=== Aquatic life ===
The environmental impact of CEC on aquatic life is broad. For example, endocrine-disrupting chemicals (EDCs) have the potential to imitate natural hormones, which can lead to reproductive failures and eventually population declines or increases in fish and amphibians. EDCs are found in a variety of common contaminants, including pesticides and industrial chemicals, and they can also lead to altered growth and reproduction in aquatic life (US EPA) (USGS.gov). Microplastics are another concern, as they can lead to physical blockages in the digestive tracts of aquatic organisms and act as paths for other toxins, leading to bioaccumulation and increase in concentration as they move up each level of the food chain. These impacts not only threaten biodiversity but also the stability of aquatic ecosystems upon which many species depend. Ongoing monitoring and regulatory efforts are crucial for assessing the full scope of CEC' impacts and for the development of effective strategies to mitigate their presence in aquatic ecosystems (NOAA.gov).

=== Human health ===
When CEC bypass water filtration systems and contaminate drinking water or accumulate in the food chain, they can also cause risks to human health. Chronic exposure to low doses of CEC has been linked to various health issues. For example, certain pharmaceutical CEC and EDCs have been associated with hormonal imbalances, increased risks of certain cancers, and developmental problems. The antibiotics present in the environment can also contribute to the development of antibiotic-resistant bacteria, which poses a serious threat to human health by reducing the effectiveness of antibiotic treatments. Studies have shown that even at low concentrations, the presence of CEC in drinking water can correlate with neurological disorders and can decrease cognitive function over time. Certain perfluoroalkyl substances (PFAS), which are a type of CEC, have been linked to different adverse health outcomes like increased cholesterol levels, changes in liver enzymes, and reduced vaccine efficacy, which raises concerns about widespread exposure to these chemicals. The CDC also identifies exposure to high levels of CEC with negative effects on the immune system, by compromising the body's ability to fight infections and increasing the risk of rheumatological diseases. Exposure to a combination of various CEC, which can occur through contaminated drinking water or food chains, may lead to cumulative on human health that are not yet fully understood.

=== Wildlife ===
Wildlife, particularly species reliant on aquatic environments, are exceptionally vulnerable to the disruptions caused by CEC. Terrestrial species can be exposed to CEC through contaminated food, water, and soil. These contaminants can cause pollution which can lead to mortality or can indirectly result in changes in behavior which affect essential activities like feeding and mating. Migratory species are especially at risk as they can spread the impact of CEC across various ecosystems. The health of wildlife populations is an important indicator of environmental quality, and the presence of CEC can signal broader ecological issues that require attention.

== Detection and monitoring ==
Detection and monitoring of CEC is done through a variety of sophisticated analytical techniques. High-performance liquid chromatography (HPLC) paired with mass spectrometry (MS) can help identify organic CEC, due to their high sensitivity and selectivity EPA. For volatile and semi-volatile compounds, gas chromatography (GC) coupled with MS is commonly used FDA. Metals and metalloids are typically analyzed using techniques like inductively coupled plasma mass spectrometry (ICP-MS), which allows for the simultaneous analysis of multiple elements USGS. The complications with monitoring CEC go past just detection. Their pathways across different environmental also must be monitored. This can be done with passive sampling devices, which accumulate contaminants over time and give a comprehensive view of contaminant levels at different locations NOAA. Biosensors are also used and integrated to detect specific contaminants rapidly, which is important for on-site monitoring applications NIH. The use of remote sensing and geographic information systems (GIS) for spatial analysis is expanding, these tools facilitate the tracking of pollution spread NASA Earth Science. Recent advancements in nanotechnology have led to the development of nano-sensors which can detect trace amounts of CEC Nature Nanotechnology.

There are sites with waste that would take hundreds of years to clean up and prevent further seepage and contamination into the water table and surrounding biosphere. In the United States, the environmental regulatory agencies on the federal level are primarily responsible for determining standards and statutes which guide policy and control in the state to prevent citizens and the environment from being exposed to harmful compounds. Emerging contaminants are examples of instances in which regulation did not do what it was supposed to, and communities have been left vulnerable to adverse health effects. Many states have assessed what can be done about emerging contaminants and currently view it as a serious issue, but only eight states have specific risk management programs addressing emerging contaminants.

== Regulations and management ==
These are tactics and methods that aim to remediate the effects of certain, or all, CEC by preventing movement throughout the environment, or limiting their concentrations in certain environmental systems. It is particularly important to ensure that water treatment approaches do not simply move contaminants from effluent to sludge given the potential for sludge to be spread to land providing an alternative route to entering the environment.

=== Advanced treatment plant technology ===
For some emerging contaminants, several advanced technologies—sonolysis, photocatalysis, Fenton-based oxidation and ozonation—have treated pollutants in laboratory experiments. Another technology is "enhanced coagulation" in which the treatment entity would work to optimize filtration by removing precursors to contamination through treatment. In the case of THMs, this meant lowering the pH, increasing the feed rate of coagulants, and encouraging domestic systems to operate with activated carbon filters and apparatuses that can perform reverse osmosis. Although these methods are effective, they are costly, and there have been many instances of treatment plants being resistant to pay for the removal of pollution, especially if it wasn't created in the water treatment process as many EC's occur from runoff, past pollution sources, and personal care products. It is also difficult to incentivize states to have their own policies surrounding contamination because it can be burdensome for states to pay for screening and prevention processes. There is also an element of environmental injustice, in that lower income communities with less purchasing and political power cannot buy their own system for filtration and are regularly exposed to harmful compounds in drinking water and food. However, recent treads for light-based systems shows great potential for such applications. With the decrease in cost of UV-LED systems and growing prevalence of solar powered systems, it shows great potential to remove CEC while keeping costs low.

=== Metal–organic framework-based nano-adsorbent remediation ===
Researchers have suggested that metal–organic frameworks (MOFs) and MOF-based nano-adsorbents (MOF-NAs) could be used in the removal of certain CEC, such as pharmaceuticals and personal care products, especially in wastewater treatment. Widespread use of MOF-based nano-adsorbents has yet to be implemented due to complications created by the vast physicochemical properties that CEC contain. The removal of CEC largely depends on the structure and porosity of the MOF-NAs and the physicochemical compatibility of both the CEC and the MOF-NAs. If a CEC is not compatible with the MOF-NA, then particular functional groups can be chemically added to increase compatibility between the two molecules. The addition of functional groups causes the reactions to rely on other chemical processes and mechanisms, such as hydrogen bonding, acid-base reactions, and complex electrostatic forces. MOF-based nano-adsorbent remediation heavily relies on water-qualities, such as pH, in order for the reaction to be executed efficiently. MOF-NA remediation can also be used to efficiently remove other heavy metals and organic compounds in wastewater treatment.

=== Membrane bioreactors ===
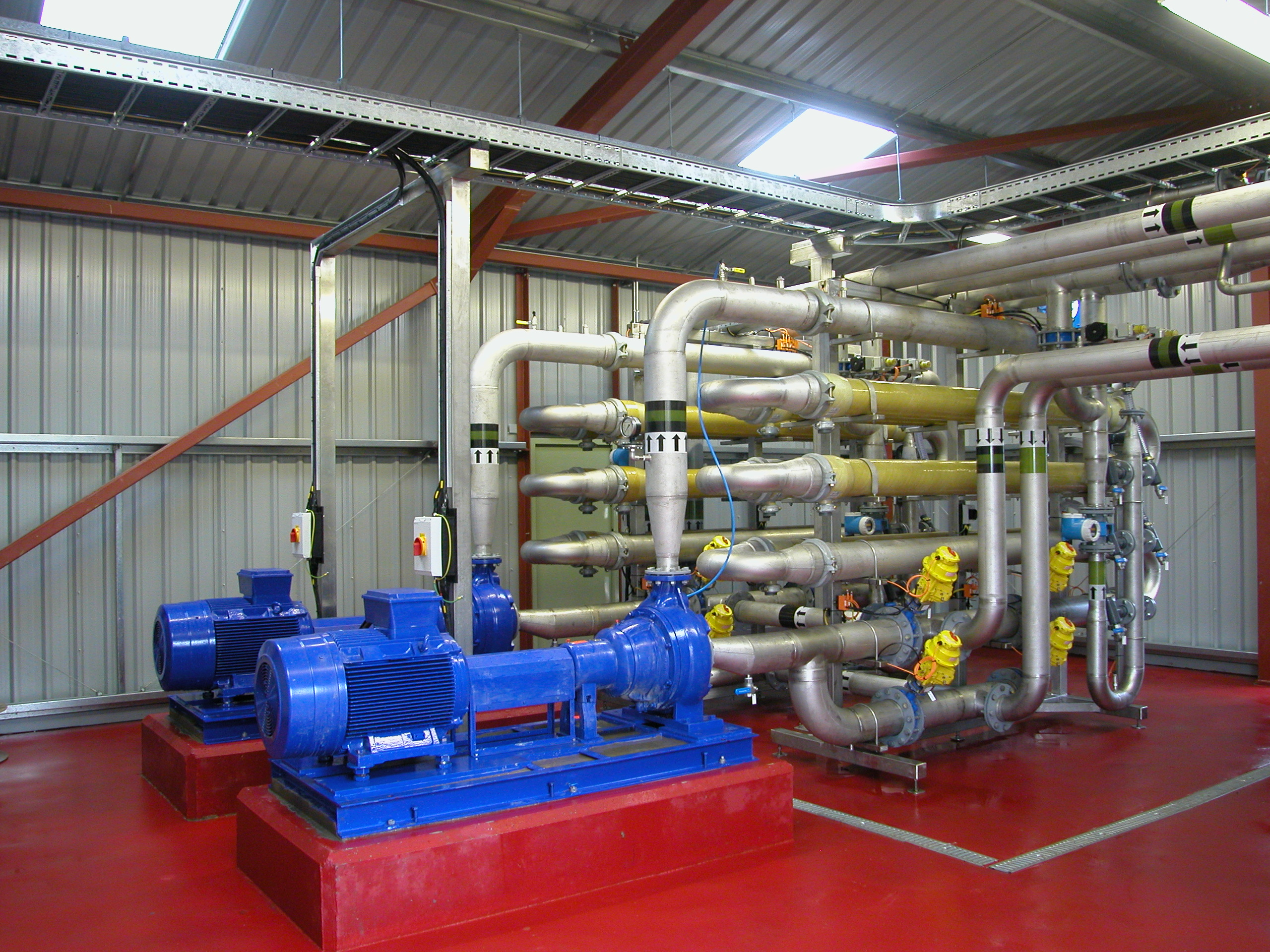
Membrane bioreactor being used to filter out CEC

Another method of possible remediation for CEC is through the use of membrane bioreactors (MBRs) that act through mechanisms of sorption and biodegradation. Membrane bioreactors have shown results on being able to filter out certain solutes and chemicals from wastewater through methods of microfiltration, but due to the extremely small size of CEC, MBRs must rely on other mechanisms in order to ensure the removal of CEC. One mechanism that MBRs use to remove CEC from wastewater is sorption. Sorption of the CEC to sludge deposits in the MBR's system can allow the deposits to sit and be bombarded with water, causing the eventual biodegradation of CEC in the membrane. Sorption of a particular CEC can be even more efficient in the system if the CEC is hydrophobic, causing it to move from the wastewater to the sludge deposits more quickly.

== Current events and advocacy ==
The management of CEC has gained increasing attention in recent years due to their potential impact on public health and the environment. In response to these concerns, various governmental and international organizations have initiated efforts to address CEC through research, regulation, and public outreach.

In January 2024, the White House Office of Science and Technology Policy announced a coordinated federal research initiative to address CEC in surface waters. The initiative aims to enhance understanding of the sources, occurrence, and effects of CEC, as well as to develop effective strategies for their removal and management.

Furthermore, the Organization for Economic Co-operation and Development (OECD) has been actively involved in addressing CEC. The OECD Workshop on Managing Contaminants of Emerging Concern in Surface Waters brought together experts from various countries to discuss challenges and solutions related to CEC, emphasizing the importance of international collaboration in tackling this global issue.

These recent developments underscore the growing recognition of the need for concerted efforts to address the challenges posed by CEC to protect public health and the environment.

Advocacy efforts for the regulation of CEC are important to push for legislation and regulatory action. Environmental advocacy groups raise awareness about the potential risks associated with CEC and urge for the advancement of environmental protection policies. These groups lobby for the enhancement of water quality standards, particularly the inclusion of CEC in the monitoring and treatment protocols of wastewater facilities, resulting in improved effluent quality NECRI.

== See also ==
- Biogeochemical Cycles of Anthropogenic Contaminants
