= Human impact on the environment =

Impact of human life on Earth and environment

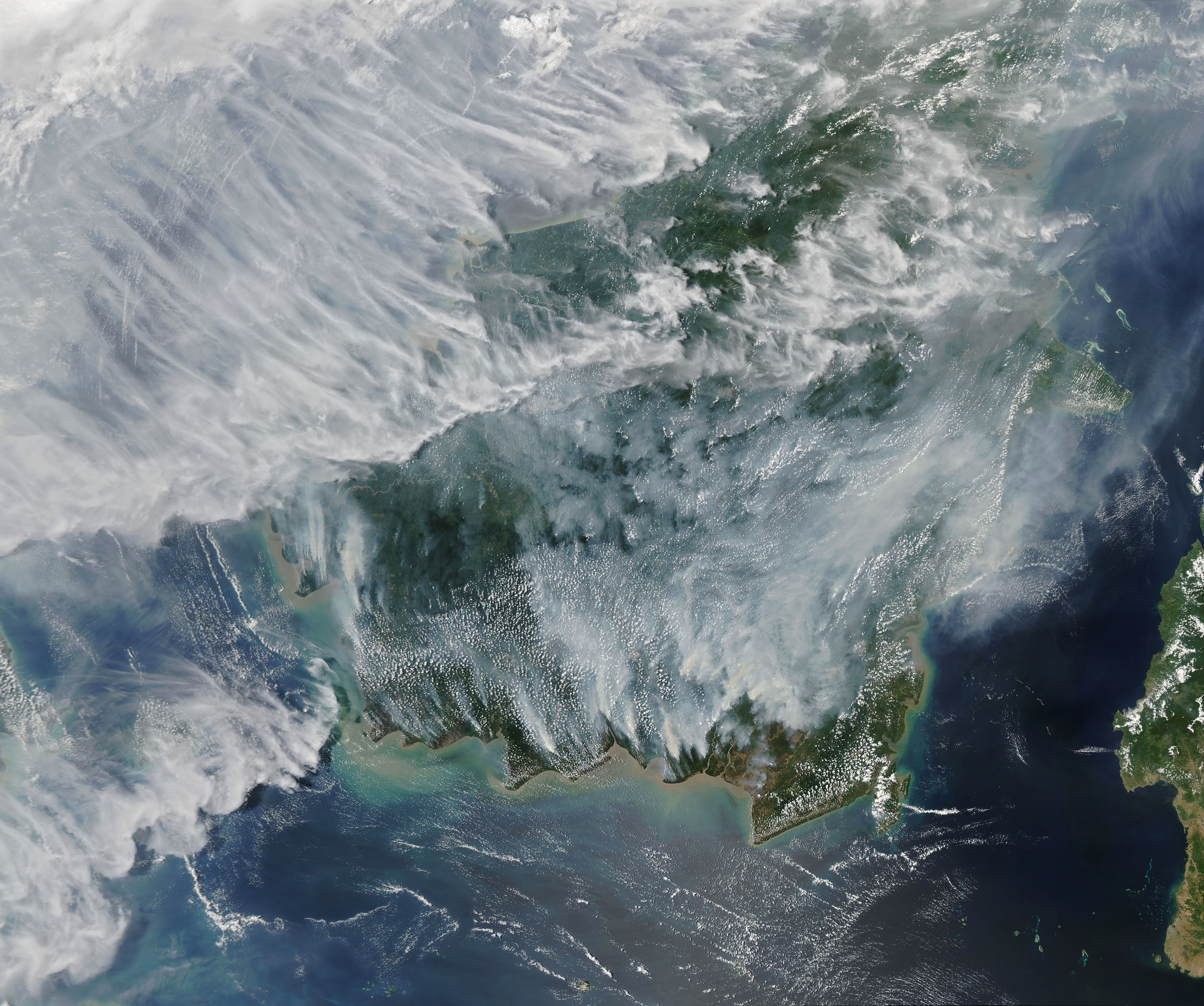
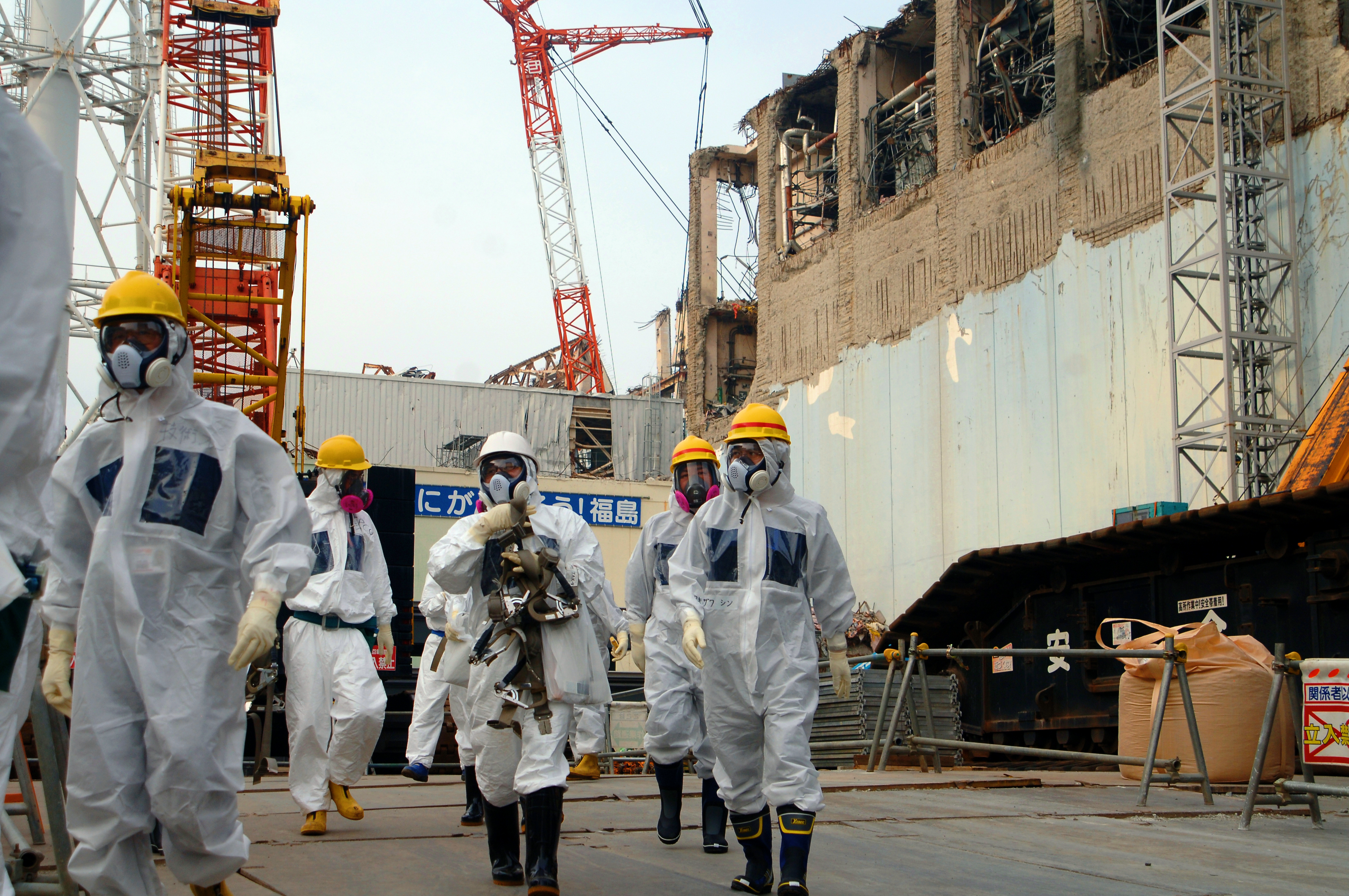
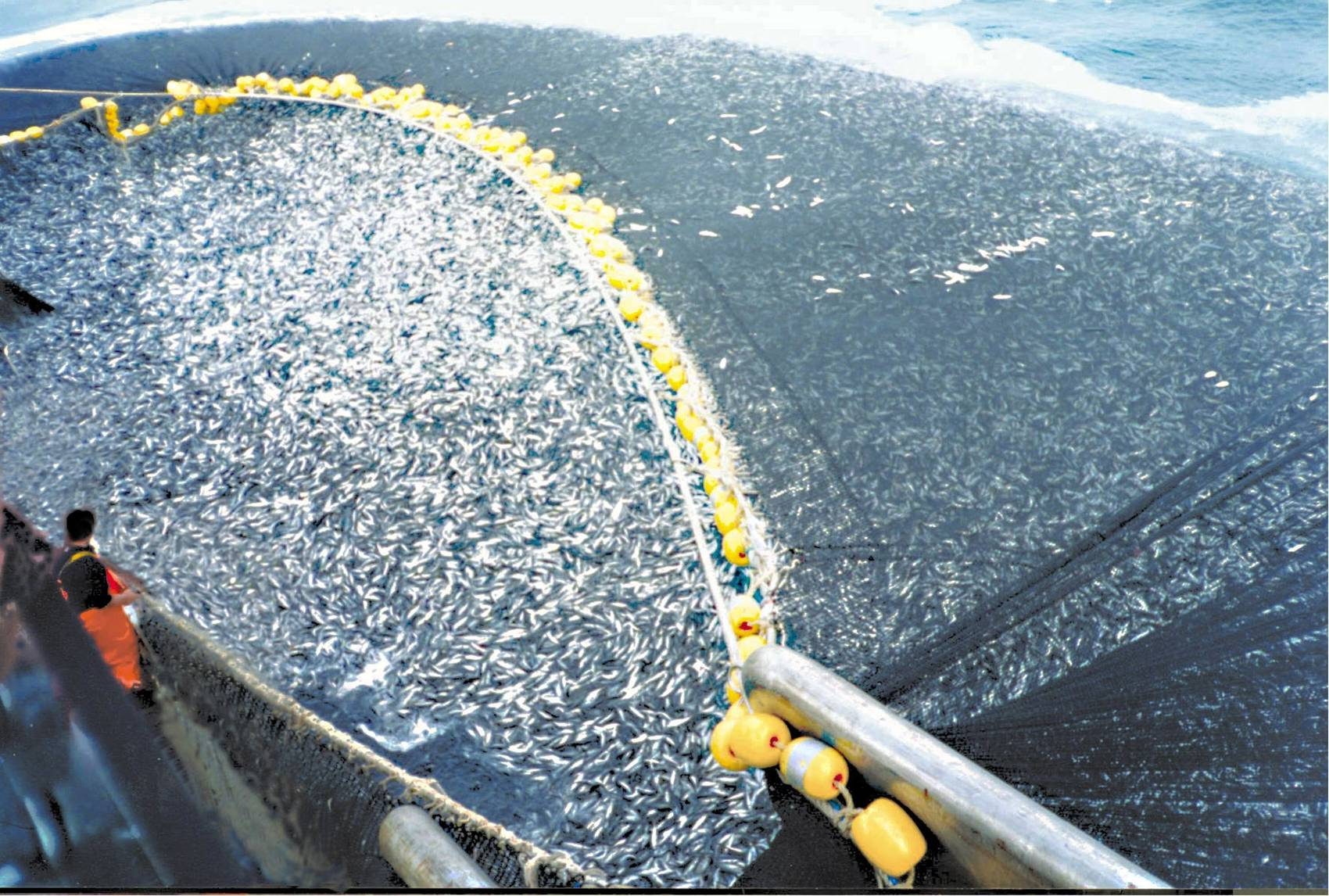
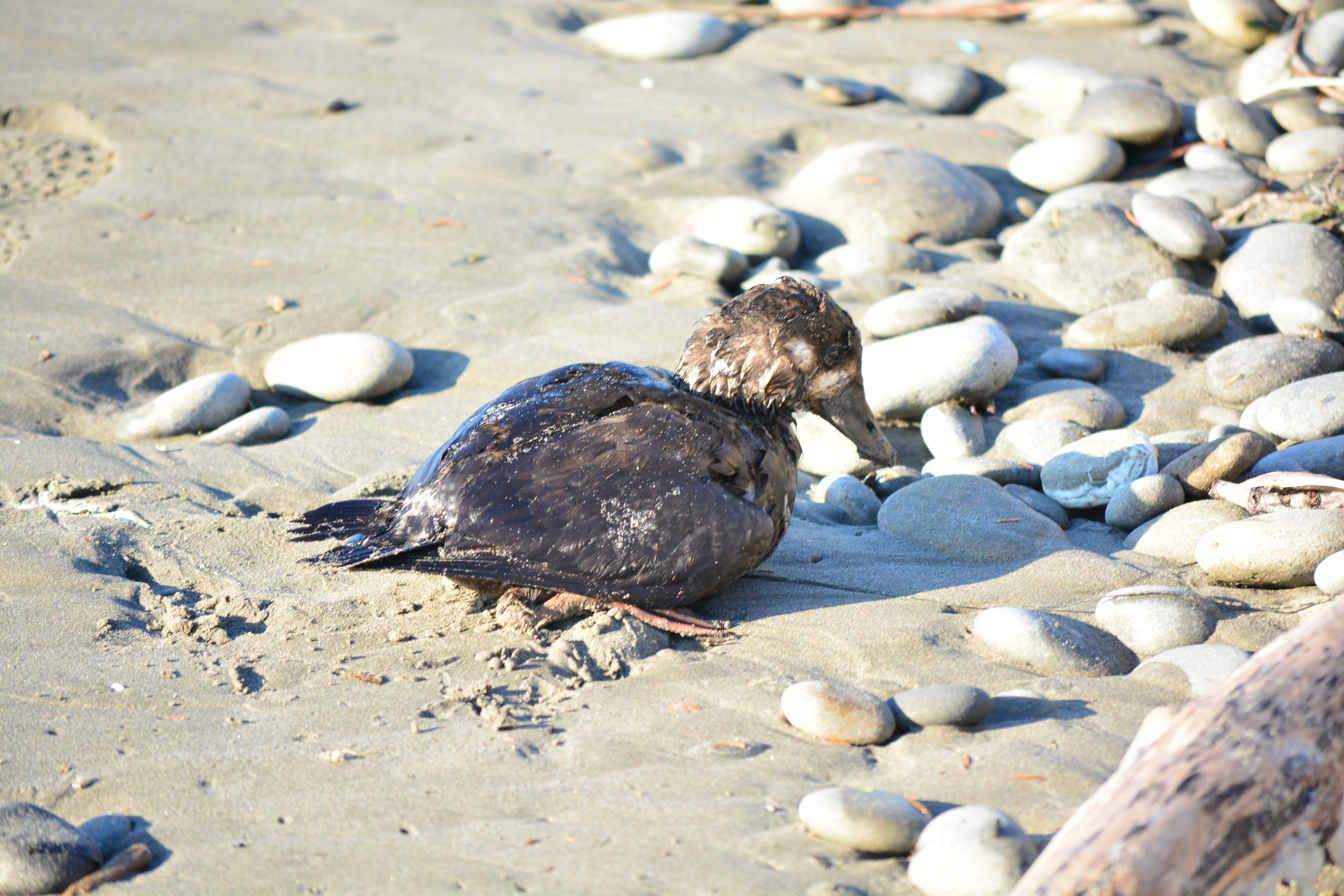
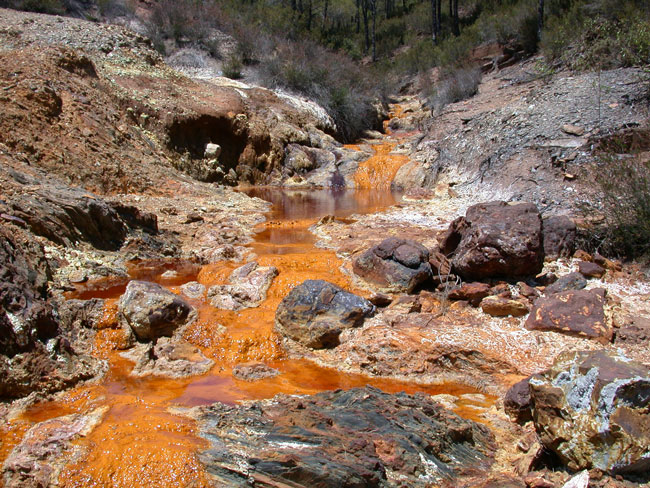
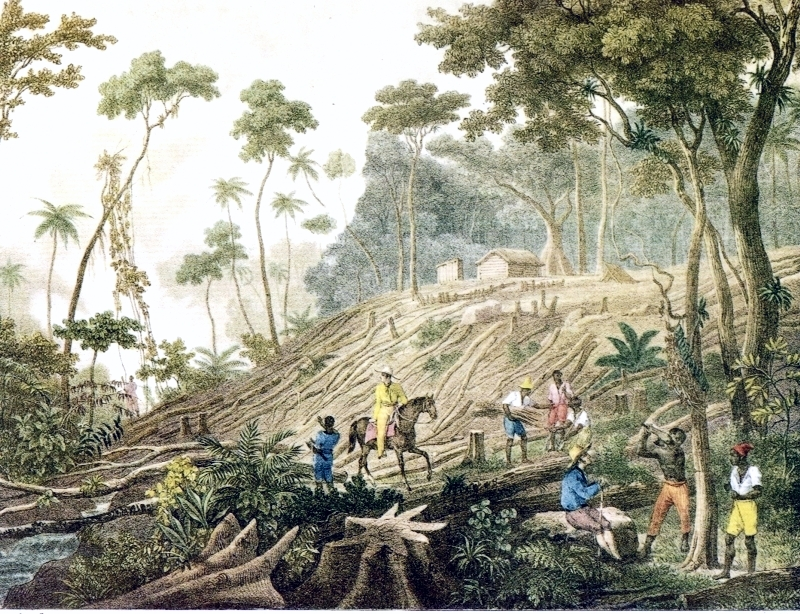
Human impact on the environment. From top left, clockwise: satellite image of Southeast Asian haze; IAEA experts investigate the Fukushima disaster;. a seabird during an oil spill; slaves clearing the Brazil's Atlantic forest on behalf of the Portuguese settlers, c. 1820–1825; acid mine drainage in the Rio Tinto; industrial fishing in 1997, a practice that has led to overfishing.

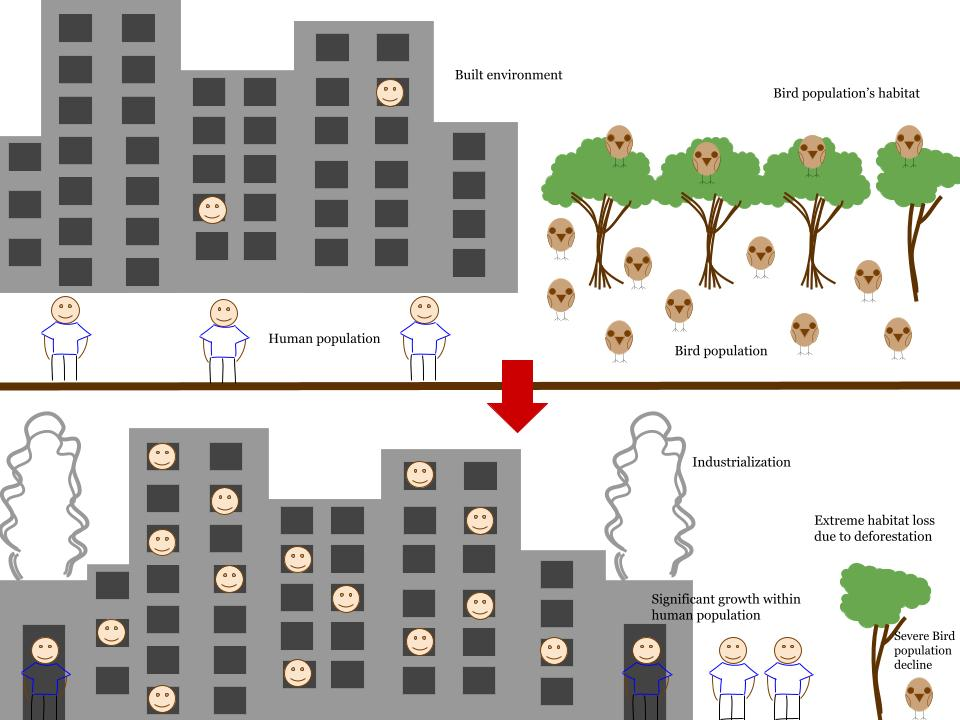
The impact of human expansion on ecosystems, highlighting how industrialization and deforestation for urban development lead to significant habitat loss and a severe decline in bird populations.

Human impact on the environment (or anthropogenic environmental impact) refers to changes to biophysical environments and to ecosystems, biodiversity, and natural resources caused directly or indirectly by humans. Modifying the environment to fit the needs of society (as in the built environment) is causing severe effects including global warming, environmental degradation (such as ocean acidification), mass extinction, and biodiversity loss, ecological crisis, and ecological collapse. Some human activities that cause damage (either directly or indirectly) to the environment on a global scale include population growth, neoliberal economic policies, and rapid economic growth. Overconsumption, overexploitation, pollution, and deforestation are also contributing to this problem. Some of the problems, including global warming and biodiversity loss, have been proposed as representing catastrophic risks to the survival of the human species.

The term anthropogenic designates an effect or object resulting from human activity. The term was first used in the technical sense by Russian geologist Alexey Pavlov, and it was first used in English by British ecologist Arthur Tansley in reference to human influences on climax plant communities. The atmospheric scientist Paul Crutzen introduced the term "Anthropocene" in the mid-1970s. The term is sometimes used in the context of pollution produced from human activity since the start of the Agricultural Revolution but also applies broadly to all major human impacts on the environment. Many of the actions taken by humans that contribute to a heated environment stem from the burning of fossil fuel from a variety of sources, such as electricity, cars, planes, space heating, manufacturing, or the destruction of forests.

== Prehistoric impacts ==
Human-caused impacts on the global environment have increased significantly since the start of the Industrial Revolution in the 1700s, but humans have been impacting their surroundings since they began populating the Earth. The impacts of prehistoric peoples during the Holocene were felt everywhere on Earth except Antarctica. The nature and extent of the impacts vary widely across the globe. Archaeological evidence demonstrates environmental impacts of prehistoric humans are "substantial, complex, and very old".

Prehistoric societies relied on three subsistence strategies: hunter-gatherer, agrarian, and pastoral. Although each subsistence strategy was characterized by distinct cultural practices, they all transformed their environment with activities such as:

- Clearing forests (sometimes with anthropogenic fire) and harvesting wood
- Hunting wildlife and foraging food
- Growing crops
- Herding livestock and pastoralism
- Constructing irrigation systems, drainage ditches, wells, dams, canals, and terraces
- Building settlements, roads, and structures
- Mining stones, materials, and metals

These activities were essential to the growth and expansion of society and culture, but they often inflicted irreversible impacts on the environment. Environmental changes often enabled societies to develop further and support larger populations, but sometimes the changes led to regional decreases of population. Population growth was accompanied by transitions from villages to urban centers, and led to the creation of road networks which geometrically expanded the areas impacted by humans.

Prehistoric human activities often damaged the planet's ecosystem and natural environment. Impacts included:

- Plant and animal species: extinctions or diminishing populations
- Greenhouse gas emissions which can lead to climate change
- Soil erosion
- Deforestation
- Pollution of land, air, and water
- Dominance of cultivated plants over endemic species
- Habitat fragmentation
- Transporting species (sometimes invasive) to new habitats

One of the most consequential impacts of prehistoric human activity was deforestation. Anthropogenic fires were widely used to clear vegetation, perhaps as early as a half million years ago by Homo erectus. Techniques used for clearing forests included axes, animal grazing, and slash-and-burn.

A large number of Late Quaternary megafauna extinctions resulted from human activity. Evidence for human-related causes includes the timing of extinctions following human arrival, the lack of climate change at the time of extinctions, archaeological evidence of hunting and habitat destruction, geographic correlation of human presence and extinction events, and analysis of large fauna that did not go extinct. Humans were not responsible for all megafauna extinctions: a 2021 study of extinctions on islands found that while extinctions during the Holocene were often caused by humans, earlier Pleistocene extinctions often were not. Some scholars, as of 2020, argue that the extinctions in North America were primarily caused by climate changes.

== Indirect drivers ==
The inward spiral shows how humans have progressively used more of Earth's resources than the planet can regenerate. Earth's ability to regenerate consumed resources now lasts only about 57% as long as in 1971.

Indirect drivers of environmental impacts are political, economic, or social forces that indirectly produce human activities that impact the environment. Indirect drivers include population, economic development, urbanization, technology, and climate change. Indirect drivers are distinct from "direct drivers" (such as mining, agriculture, urban infrastructure, transportation) which are the results of the indirect drivers.

=== Overconsumption ===
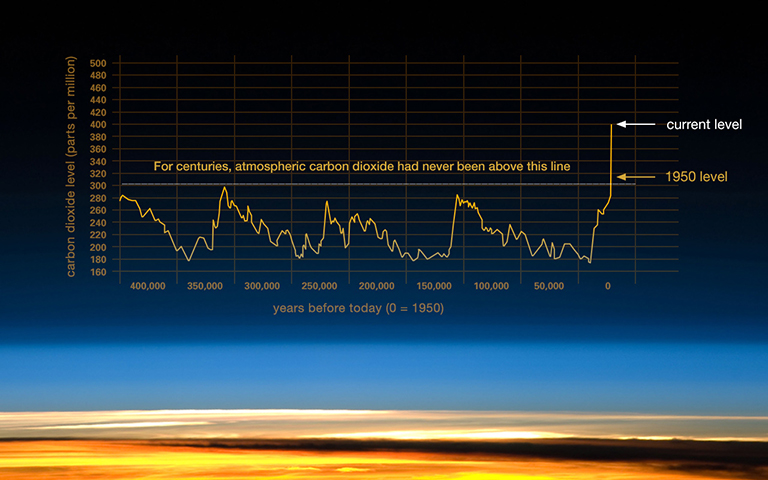
Chart published by NASA depicting CO_{2} levels from the past 400,000 years.

Overconsumption is a situation where resource use has outpaced the sustainable capacity of the ecosystem. It can be measured by the ecological footprint, a resource accounting approach which compares human demand on ecosystems with the amount of planet matter ecosystems can renew. Estimates by the Global Footprint Network indicate that humanity's current demand is 70% higher than the regeneration rate of all of the planet's ecosystems combined. A prolonged pattern of overconsumption leads to environmental degradation and the eventual loss of resource bases.

Humanity's overall impact on the planet is affected by many factors, not just the raw number of people. Their lifestyle (including overall affluence and resource use) and the pollution they generate (including carbon footprint) are equally important. In 2008, The New York Times stated that the inhabitants of the developed nations of the world consume resources like oil and metals at a rate almost 32 times greater than those of the developing world, who make up the majority of the human population.

Reduction of one's carbon footprint for various actions.

Human civilization has caused the loss of 83% of all wild mammals and half of plants. The world's chickens weigh three times as much as all wild birds combined, while domesticated cattle and pigs outweigh all wild mammals by 14 to 1. Global meat consumption is projected to more than double by 2050, perhaps as much as 76%, as the global population rises to more than 9 billion, which will be a significant driver of further biodiversity loss and increased greenhouse gas emissions.

=== Population growth ===
Human population from 10000 BCE to 2000 CE, increasing sevenfold after the eighteenth century.

Some scholars, environmentalists and advocates have linked human population growth or population size as a driver of environmental issues, including some suggesting this indicates an overpopulation scenario. In 2017, over 15,000 scientists around the world issued a second warning to humanity which asserted that rapid human population growth is the "primary driver behind many ecological and even societal threats." According to the Global Assessment Report on Biodiversity and Ecosystem Services, released by the United Nations' Intergovernmental Science-Policy Platform on Biodiversity and Ecosystem Services in 2019, human population growth is a significant factor in contemporary biodiversity loss. A 2021 report in Frontiers in Conservation Science proposed that population size and growth are significant factors in biodiversity loss, soil degradation and pollution.

Some scientists and environmentalists, including Pentti Linkola, Jared Diamond and E. O. Wilson, posit that human population growth is devastating to biodiversity. Wilson, for example, has expressed concern that when Homo sapiens reached a population of six billion their biomass exceeded that of any other large land-dwelling animal species that had ever existed by over 100 times. A 2026 study published in Sustainable Development argued that gradually reducing the human population to 4 billion by 2200 is a path towards sustainability which will help decrease overconsumption of resources, wildlife defaunation, pollution levels and greenhouse gas emissions.

However, attributing overpopulation as a cause of environmental issues is controversial. Demographic projections indicate that population growth is slowing and world population will peak in the 21st century, and many experts believe that global resources can meet this increased demand, suggesting a global overpopulation scenario is unlikely. Other projections have the population continuing to grow into the next century. While some studies, including the British government's 2021 Economics of Biodiversity review, posit that population growth and overconsumption are interdependent, critics suggest blaming overpopulation for environmental issues can unduly blame poor populations in the Global South or oversimplify more complex drivers, leading some to treat overconsumption as a separate issue.

Advocates for further reducing fertility rates, among them Rodolfo Dirzo and Paul R. Ehrlich, argue that this reduction should primarily affect the "overconsuming wealthy and middle classes," with the ultimate goal being to shrink "the scale of the human enterprise" and reverse the "growthmania" which they say threatens biodiversity and the "life-support systems of humanity."

=== Climate change ===
The primary causes and the wide-ranging effects of global warming and resulting climate change. Some effects constitute feedbacks that intensify climate change.

Climate Central's review of climate attribution studies covered almost 750 extreme weather events and trends, of various event types. The review found that climate change made almost all studied event types substantially more likely or more severe—with cold/snow/ice events being the exception.

Contemporary climate change is the result of increasing atmospheric greenhouse gas concentrations, which are caused primarily by combustion of fossil fuels (coal, oil, natural gas), and by deforestation, land use changes, and cement production. Such a massive alteration of the global carbon cycle has only been possible because of the availability and deployment of advanced technologies, ranging in application from fossil fuel exploration, extraction, distribution, refining, and combustion in power plants and automobile engines and advanced farming practices.

Livestock contributes to climate change both through the production of greenhouse gases and through destruction of carbon sinks such as rainforests. According to the 2006 United Nations/FAO report, 18% of all greenhouse gas emissions found in the atmosphere are due to livestock. The raising of livestock and the land needed to feed them has resulted in the destruction of millions of acres of rainforest and as global demand for meat rises, so too will the demand for land. Ninety-one percent of all rainforest land deforested since 1970 is now used for livestock.

=== Other indirect drivers ===
Other indirect drivers of environmental impacts include technological advancement, which is moving at a rapid pace and leading to new technologies – some of which are risky (such as nuclear energy) as well as technologies such as renewable energy and energy storage.

Urbanization is an indirect driver, and the global trend of migration from rural areas into urban areas is continuing in the 21st century, particularly in the global south.

Economic development is a driver that involves income inequality, trade wars, and challenges related to sustainability. Globally, economic activity is shifting from agriculture to services and industry.

Cultural values are a major indirect driver. In particular, the way that a society views nature will determine the degree of effort made to preserve it. Values may include a sense of relationship with nature, or a dependency on nature for feelings of well-being. Societal transformations such as urbanization and globalization may change the way that a culture values nature and the environment.

== Ecosystem impacts ==
=== Environmental degradation ===
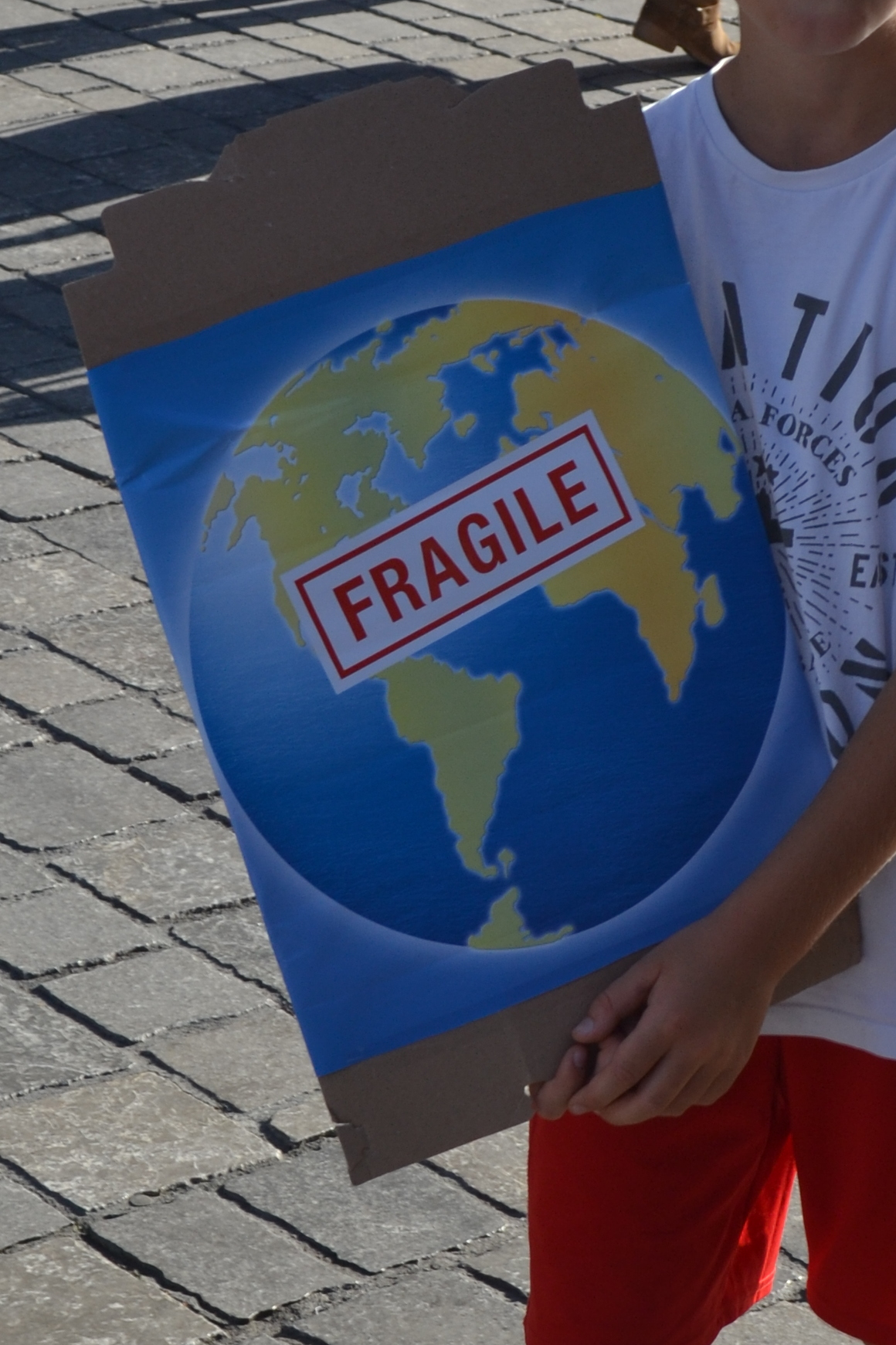
Child demonstrating for actions to protect the environment.

Human activity is causing environmental degradation, which is the deterioration of the environment through depletion of resources such as air, water and soil; the destruction of ecosystems; habitat destruction; the extinction of wildlife; and pollution. It is defined as any change or disturbance to the environment perceived to be deleterious or undesirable. As indicated by the I=PAT equation, environmental impact (I) or degradation is caused by the combination of an already very large and increasing human population (P), continually increasing economic growth or per capita affluence (A), and the application of resource-depleting and polluting technology (T).

According to a 2021 study published in Frontiers in Forests and Global Change, roughly 3% of the planet's terrestrial surface is ecologically and faunally intact, meaning areas with healthy populations of native animal species and little to no human footprint. Many of these intact ecosystems were in areas inhabited by indigenous peoples.

=== Habitat fragmentation ===
The rate of global tree cover loss has approximately doubled since 2001, to an annual loss approaching an area the size of Italy.

The period since 1950 has brought "the most rapid transformation of the human relationship with the natural world in the history of humankind". Through 2018, humans have reduced forest area by ~30% and grasslands/shrubs by ~68%, to make way for livestock grazing and crops for humans.

According to a 2018 study in Nature, 87% of the oceans and 77% of land (excluding Antarctica) have been altered by anthropogenic activity, and 23% of the planet's landmass remains as wilderness.

Habitat fragmentation is the reduction of large tracts of habitat leading to habitat loss. Habitat fragmentation and loss are considered as being the main cause of the loss of biodiversity and degradation of the ecosystem all over the world. Human actions are greatly responsible for habitat fragmentation, and loss as these actions alter the connectivity and quality of habitats. Understanding the consequences of habitat fragmentation is important for the preservation of biodiversity and enhancing the functioning of the ecosystem.

Both agricultural plants and animals depend on pollination for reproduction. Vegetables and fruits are an important diet for human beings and depend on pollination. Whenever there is habitat destruction, pollination is reduced and crop yield as well. Many plants also rely on animals and most especially those that eat fruit for seed dispersal. Therefore, the destruction of habitat for animal severely affects all the plant species that depend on them.

=== Mass extinction ===
Biodiversity generally refers to the variety and variability of life on Earth, and is represented by the number of different species there are on the planet. Since its introduction, Homo sapiens (the human species) have been killing off entire species either directly (such as through hunting) or indirectly (such as by destroying habitats), causing the extinction of species at an alarming rate. Humans are the main cause of the current mass extinction, called the Holocene extinction, driving extinctions to 100 to 1000 times the normal background rate. Though most experts agree that human beings have accelerated the rate of species extinction, some scholars have postulated without humans, the biodiversity of the Earth would grow at an exponential rate rather than decline. The Holocene extinction continues, with meat consumption, overfishing, ocean acidification, agriculture, coupled human and animal systems, and the amphibian crisis being a few broader examples of an almost universal, cosmopolitan decline in biodiversity. Human overpopulation (and continued population growth) along with overconsumption, especially by the super-affluent, are considered to be the primary drivers of this rapid decline. The 2017 World Scientists' Warning to Humanity stated that, among other things, this sixth extinction event unleashed by humanity could annihilate many current life forms and consign them to extinction by the end of this century. A 2022 scientific review published in Biological Reviews confirms that a biodiversity loss crisis caused by human activity, which the researchers describe as a sixth mass extinction event, is currently underway.

A June 2020 study published in PNAS argues that the contemporary extinction crisis "may be the most serious environmental threat to the persistence of civilization, because it is irreversible" and that its acceleration "is certain because of the still fast growth in human numbers and consumption rates."

High-level political attention on the environment has been focused largely on climate change because energy policy is central to economic growth. But biodiversity is just as important for the future of earth as climate change.

— Robert Watson, 2019.

=== Biodiversity loss ===
The World Wildlife Fund's Living Planet Report 2022 found that wildlife populations declined by an average 69% since 1970.

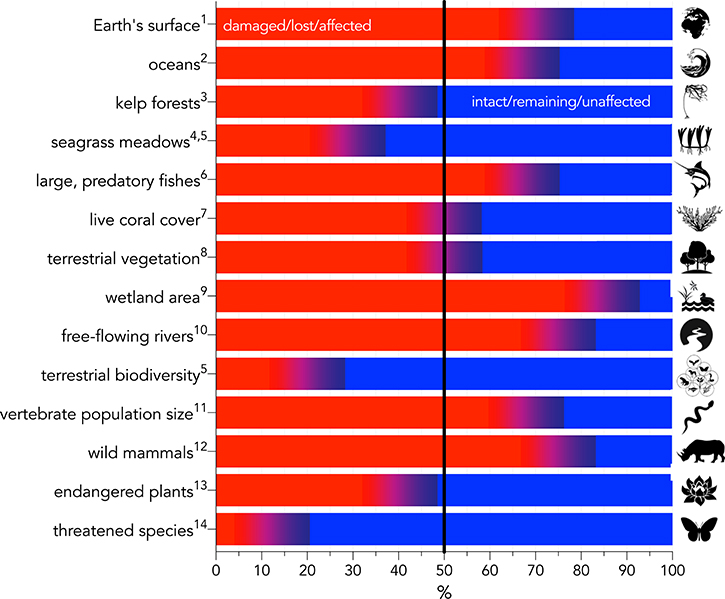
Biodiversity-related environmental-change categories expressed as a percentage of human-driven change (in red) relative to baseline (blue)

It has been estimated that from 1970 to 2016, 68% of the world's wildlife has been destroyed due to human activity. In South America, there is believed to be a 70 percent loss. A May 2018 study published in PNAS found that 83% of wild mammals, 80% of marine mammals, 50% of plants and 15% of fish have been lost since the dawn of human civilization. Currently, livestock make up 60% of the biomass of all mammals on Earth, followed by humans (36%) and wild mammals (4%). According to the 2019 global biodiversity assessment by IPBES, human civilization has pushed one million species of plants and animals to the brink of extinction, with many of these projected to vanish over the next few decades.

When plant biodiversity declines, the remaining plants face diminishing productivity. Biodiversity loss threatens ecosystem productivity and services such as food, fresh water, raw materials and medicinal resources.

A 2019 report that assessed a total of 28,000 plant species concluded that close to half of them were facing a threat of extinction. The failure of noticing and appreciating plants is regarded as "plant blindness", and this is a worrying trend as it puts more plants at the threat of extinction than animals. Our increased farming has come at a higher cost to plant biodiversity as half of the habitable land on Earth is used for agriculture, and this is one of the major reasons behind the plant extinction crisis.

Defaunation is the loss of animals from ecological communities.

=== Invasive species ===
Invasive species are defined by the U.S. Department of Agriculture as non-native to the specific ecosystem, and whose presence is likely to harm the health of humans or the animals in said system.

Introductions of non-native species into new areas have brought about major and permanent changes to the environment over large areas. Examples include the introduction of Caulerpa taxifolia into the Mediterranean, the introduction of oat species into the California grasslands, and the introduction of privet, kudzu, and purple loosestrife to North America. Rats, cats, and goats have radically altered biodiversity in many islands. Additionally, introductions have resulted in genetic changes to native fauna where interbreeding has taken place, as with buffalo with domestic cattle, and wolves with domestic dogs.

=== Human Introduced Invasive Species ===
==== Cats ====
Domestic and feral cats globally are particularly notorious for their destruction of native birds and other animal species. This is especially true for Australia, which attributes over two-thirds of mammal extinction to domestic and feral cats, and over 1.5 billion deaths to native animals each year. Because domesticated outside cats are fed by their owners, they can continue to hunt even when prey populations decline and they would otherwise go elsewhere. This is a major problem for places where there is a highly diverse and dense number of lizards, birds, snakes, and mice populating the area. Roaming outdoor cats can also be attributed to the transmission of harmful diseases like rabies and toxoplasmosis to the native wildlife population.

==== Burmese Python ====
Another example of a destructive introduced invasive species is the Burmese Python. Originating from parts of Southeast Asia, the Burmese Python has made the most notable impact in the Southern Florida Everglades of the United States. After a breeding facility breach in 1992 due to flooding and snake owners releasing unwanted pythons back into the wild, the population of the Burmese Python would boom in the warm climate of Florida in the following years. This impact has been felt most significantly at the southernmost regions of the Everglades. A study in 2012 compared native species population counts in Florida from 1997 and found that raccoon populations declined 99.3%, opossums 98.9%, and rabbit/fox populations effectively disappeared.

==== Hybrid boars ====
In the 1980s, Canadian pig farmers introduced wild boars from the United Kingdom into their breeding programs, leading to a hybrid with more meat. However, when the pork market collapsed in 2001, many of these hybrids were released into the wild. These hybrids, now numbering around 62,000 are thriving in the Canadian prairies due to their adaptation to harsh winters, with thick fur and long legs, and tusks sharp enough to dig through soil for food. They cause significant agricultural damage and have grown to a point where even substantial culling efforts are insufficient. This issue has escalated to the extent that these boars are starting to migrate into northern US states, raising concerns about potential crop damage and the spread of diseases like African swine flu, which could severely impact the pork industry.

=== Coral reef decline ===
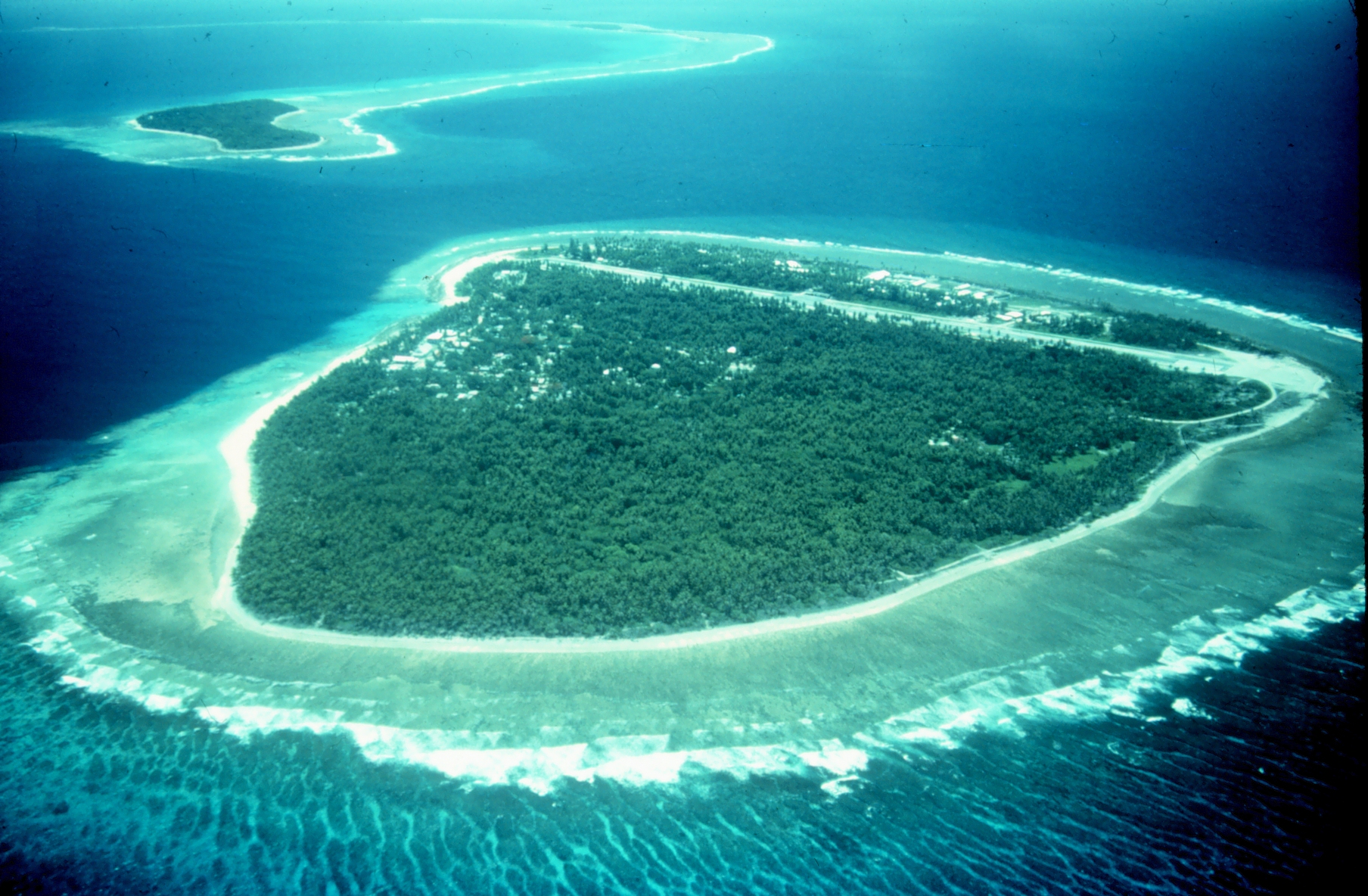
Island (Falalop) with fringing reef off Yap, Micronesia. Coral reefs are dying around the world.

Human activities have substantial impact on coral reefs, contributing to their worldwide decline. Damaging activities encompass coral mining, pollution (both organic and non-organic), overfishing, blast fishing, as well as the excavation of canals and access points to islands and bays. Additional threats comprise disease, destructive fishing practices, and the warming of oceans. Furthermore, the ocean's function as a carbon dioxide sink, alterations in the atmosphere, ultraviolet light, ocean acidification, viral infections, the repercussions of dust storms transporting agents to distant reefs, pollutants, and algal blooms represent some of the factors exerting influence on coral reefs. Importantly, the jeopardy faced by coral reefs extends far beyond coastal regions. The ramifications of climate change, notably global warming, induce an elevation in ocean temperatures that triggers coral bleaching—a potentially lethal phenomenon for coral ecosystems.

Scientists estimate that between 2020 and 2040, about 70 to 90% of all coral reefs will disappear, with primary causes being warming ocean waters, ocean acidity, and pollution. Others believe that the mass mortality events over this time frame will give way to the expansion of thermally tolerant mutant populations, but at the cost of coral genetic diversity. In 2008, a worldwide study estimated that 19% of the existing area of coral reefs had already been lost. Less than 20% of the world's reefs could be currently regarded as in good health and about 75% of the world's reefs may be at risk due to destructive, human-related activities. The threat to the health of reefs is particularly strong in Southeast Asia, where 95% of reefs are endangered. By the 2030s, 90% of reefs are expected to be at risk from both human activities and climate change; by 2050, it is predicted that all coral reefs will be in danger.

=== Water pollution ===
Domestic, industrial and agricultural wastewater can be treated in wastewater treatment plants for treatment before being released into aquatic ecosystems. Treated wastewater still contains a range of different chemical and biological contaminants which may influence surrounding ecosystems.

Water pollution (or aquatic pollution) is the contamination of water bodies, which has a negative impact on how they can be used. It is usually caused by human activities. Water bodies include surface water (lakes, rivers, oceans, reservoirs) and groundwater. Water pollution results when contaminants mix with these water bodies. Contaminants can come from one of four main sources. These are sewage discharges, industrial activities, agricultural activities, and urban runoff including stormwater.

This form of pollution can lead to many problems. One is the degradation of aquatic ecosystems. Another is spreading water-borne diseases when people use polluted water for drinking or irrigation. Water pollution also reduces the ecosystem services such as drinking water provided by the water resource.

=== Atmospheric impacts ===
==== Acid deposition ====
Acid rain – defined to be rain that has a pH less than 5.65 – is an example of "acid deposition", where acidity is transferred from one region to another. (Note: Some scientists prefer the term "acid deposition" over "over rain" because acid can be transferred from one region to another through the atmosphere, without the involvement of rain.) Acid rain can be the result of the presence of various sulfur and nitrogen compounds in the atmosphere, such as sulfur dioxide or nitrogen oxides. Human activities generate substantial amounts of these chemicals, particularly from industrial facilities and from coal-fired power stations that generate electricity. The amount of sulfur emissions produced by human activities increased steadily throughout the Industrial Age. Acid deposition can damage the environment in several ways: increasing the acidity of rivers and lakes, decreasing plant growth, killing fish, and altering the composition of soil. Since the late 20th century, air-quality policies were established in North America and Europe to reduce sulfur and nitrogen emissions, leading to a decrease in acid deposition in those regions.

==== Ozone depletion ====
The ozone layer, located in the stratosphere, is an important component of the Earth's atmosphere which prevents harmful wavelengths of ultraviolet (UVB) light from reaching the Earth's surface. (Note: The ozone in the stratosphere, which protects against UVB radiation, should not be confused with ground-level ozone which can be harmful and is considered a pollutant.) The amount of UVB radiation reaching the Earth's surface has an important role in regulating photosynthesis in plants, especially phytoplankton. Several anthropogenic (human-made) chemicals, known as ozone-depleting substances (ODS) – including chlorofluorocarbons – can reduce the ozone in the atmosphere. The amount of ODS in the atmosphere was steadily increasing since the mid-20th century, due to their use in common equipment such as refrigerators and air conditioners. After the Montreal Protocol was ratified in 1989, the levels of ODS have been decreasing, and the ozone layer has been gradually returning to its 1980 levels.

==== Disruption of the nitrogen cycle ====
Of particular concern is N_{2}O, which has an average atmospheric lifetime of 114–120 years, and is 300 times more effective than CO_{2} as a greenhouse gas. NO_{x} produced by industrial processes, automobiles and agricultural fertilization and NH_{3} emitted from soils (i.e., as an additional byproduct of nitrification) and livestock operations are transported to downwind ecosystems, influencing N cycling and nutrient losses. Six major effects of NO_{x} and NH_{3} emissions have been identified:

1. decreased atmospheric visibility due to ammonium aerosols (fine particulate matter [PM])
2. elevated ozone concentrations
3. ozone and PM affects human health (e.g. respiratory diseases, cancer)
4. increases in radiative forcing and global warming
5. decreased agricultural productivity due to ozone deposition
6. ecosystem acidification and eutrophication.

== Human activities ==
=== Fishing and farming ===
The environmental impact of agriculture varies based on the wide variety of agricultural practices employed around the world. Ultimately, the environmental impact depends on the production practices of the system used by farmers. The connection between emissions into the environment and the farming system is indirect, as it also depends on other climate variables such as rainfall and temperature.

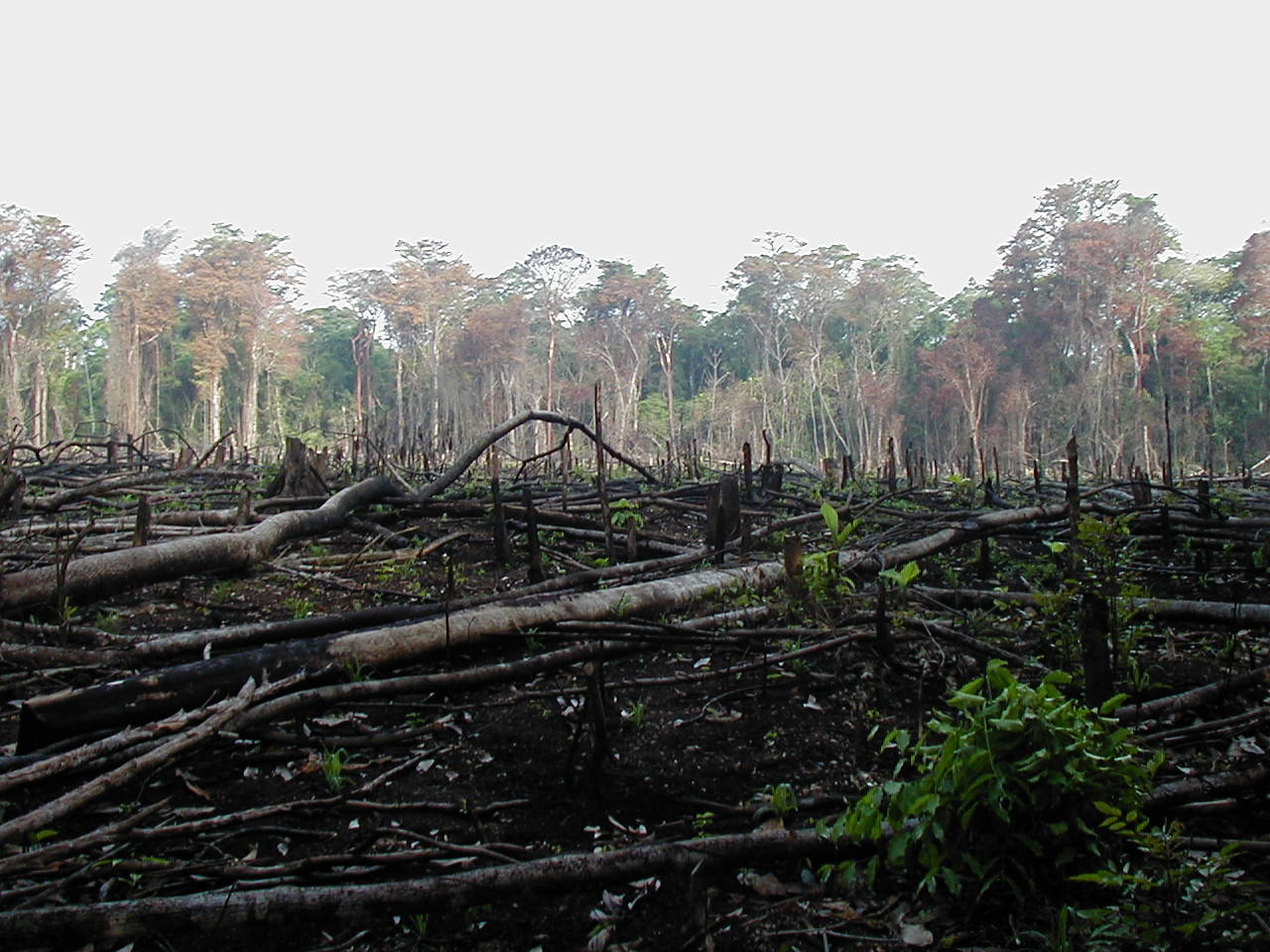
Lacanja burn

There are two types of indicators of environmental impact: "means-based", which are based on the farmer's production methods, and "effect-based", which is the impact that farming methods have on the farming system or on emissions to the environment. An example of a means-based indicator would be the quality of groundwater that is affected by the amount of nitrogen applied to the soil. An indicator reflecting the loss of nitrate to groundwater would be effect-based.

The environmental impact of agriculture involves a variety of factors from the soil, to water, the air, animal and soil diversity, plants, and the food itself. Some of the environmental issues that are related to agriculture are climate change, deforestation, genetic engineering, irrigation problems, pollutants, soil degradation, and waste.

==== Fishing ====
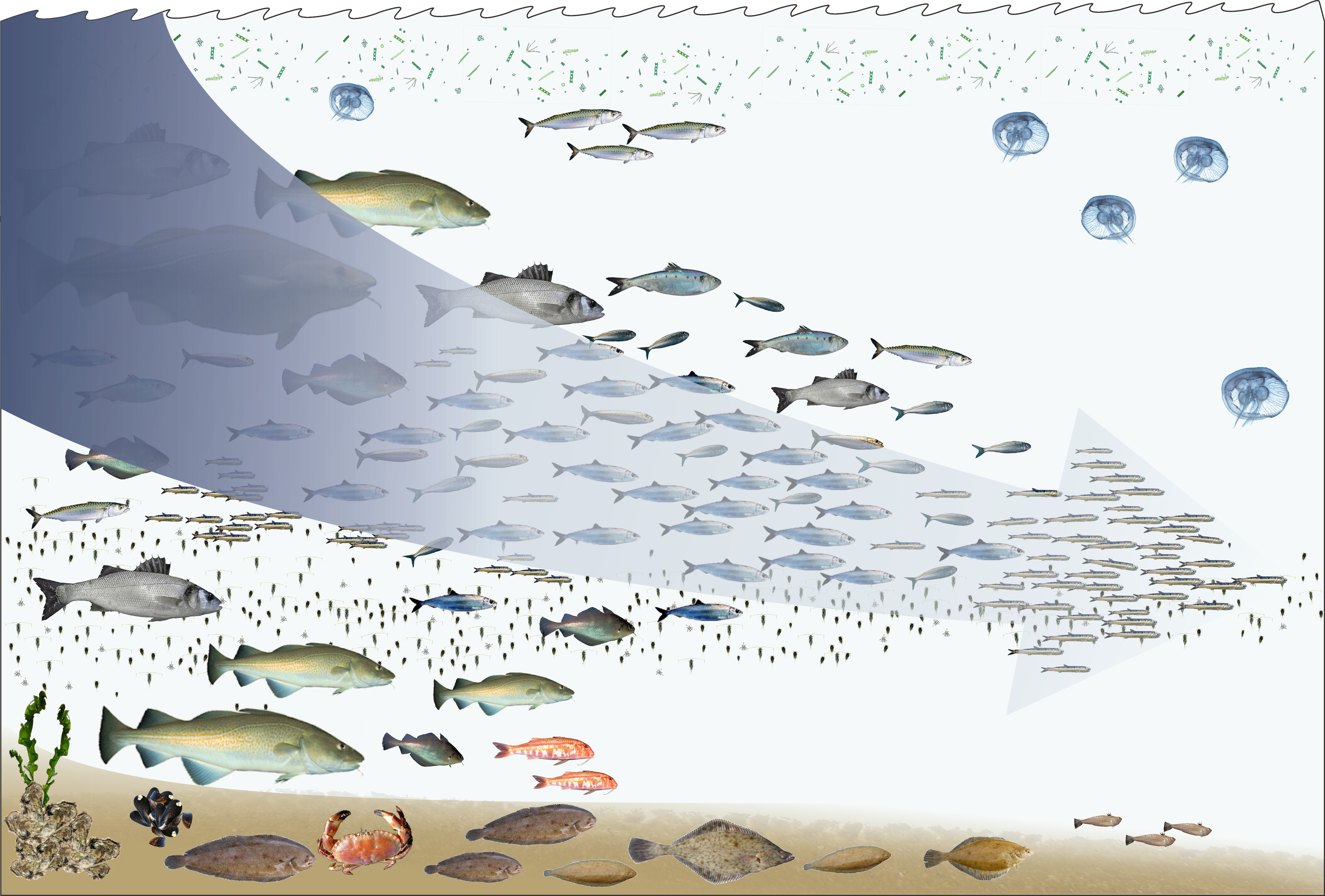
Fishing down the food web

The environmental impact of fishing can be divided into issues that involve the availability of fish to be caught, such as overfishing, sustainable fisheries, and fisheries management; and issues that involve the impact of fishing on other elements of the environment, such as by-catch and destruction of habitat such as coral reefs. According to the 2019 Intergovernmental Science-Policy Platform on Biodiversity and Ecosystem Services report, overfishing is the main driver of mass species extinction in the oceans.

These conservation issues are part of marine conservation, and are addressed in fisheries science programs. There is a growing gap between how many fish are available to be caught and humanity's desire to catch them, a problem that gets worse as the world population grows.

Similar to other environmental issues, there can be conflict between the fishermen who depend on fishing for their livelihoods and fishery scientists who realize that if future fish populations are to be sustainable then some fisheries must reduce or even close.

The journal Science published a four-year study in November 2006, which predicted that, at prevailing trends, the world would run out of wild-caught seafood in 2048. The scientists stated that the decline was a result of overfishing, pollution and other environmental factors that were reducing the population of fisheries at the same time as their ecosystems were being degraded. Yet again the analysis has met criticism as being fundamentally flawed, and many fishery management officials, industry representatives and scientists challenge the findings, although the debate continues. Many countries, such as Tonga, the United States, Australia and New Zealand, and international management bodies have taken steps to appropriately manage marine resources.

The UN's Food and Agriculture Organization (FAO) released their biennial State of World Fisheries and Aquaculture in 2018 noting that capture fishery production has remained constant for the last two decades but unsustainable overfishing has increased to 33% of the world's fisheries. They also noted that aquaculture, the production of farmed fish, has increased from 120 million tonnes per year in 1990 to over 170 million tonnes in 2018.

Populations of oceanic sharks and rays have been reduced by 71% since 1970, largely due to overfishing. More than three-quarters of the species comprising this group are now threatened with extinction.

==== Irrigation ====
The environmental impact of irrigation includes the changes in quantity and quality of soil and water as a result of irrigation and the ensuing effects on natural and social conditions at the tail-end and downstream of the irrigation scheme.

The impacts stem from the changed hydrological conditions owing to the installation and operation of the scheme.

An irrigation scheme often draws water from the river and distributes it over the irrigated area. As a hydrological result it is found that:

- the downstream river discharge is reduced
- the evaporation in the scheme is increased
- the groundwater recharge in the scheme is increased
- the level of the water table rises
- the drainage flow is increased.

These may be called direct effects.

Effects on soil and water quality are indirect and complex, and subsequent impacts on natural, ecological and socio-economic conditions are intricate. In some, but not all instances, waterlogging and soil salinization can result. However, irrigation can also be used, together with soil drainage, to overcome soil salinization by leaching excess salts from the vicinity of the root zone.

Irrigation can also be done extracting groundwater by (tube)wells. As a hydrological result it is found that the level of the water descends. The effects may be water mining, land/soil subsidence, and, along the coast, saltwater intrusion.

Irrigation projects can have large benefits, but the negative side effects are often overlooked.

Agricultural irrigation technologies such as high powered water pumps, dams, and pipelines are responsible for the large-scale depletion of fresh water resources such as aquifers, lakes, and rivers. As a result of this massive diversion of freshwater, lakes, rivers, and creeks are running dry, severely altering or stressing surrounding ecosystems, and contributing to the extinction of many aquatic species.

==== Agricultural land loss ====
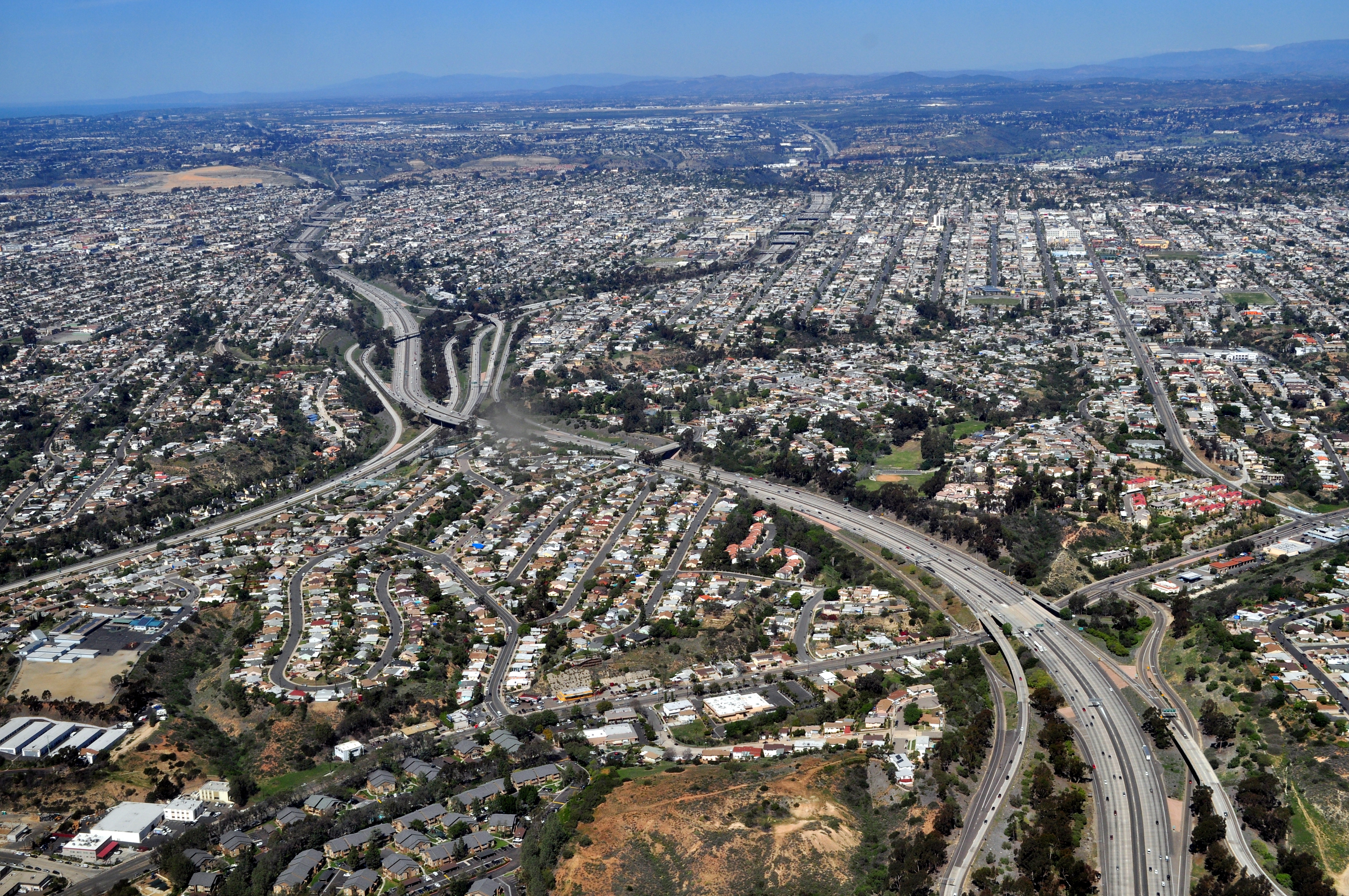
Urban sprawl in California

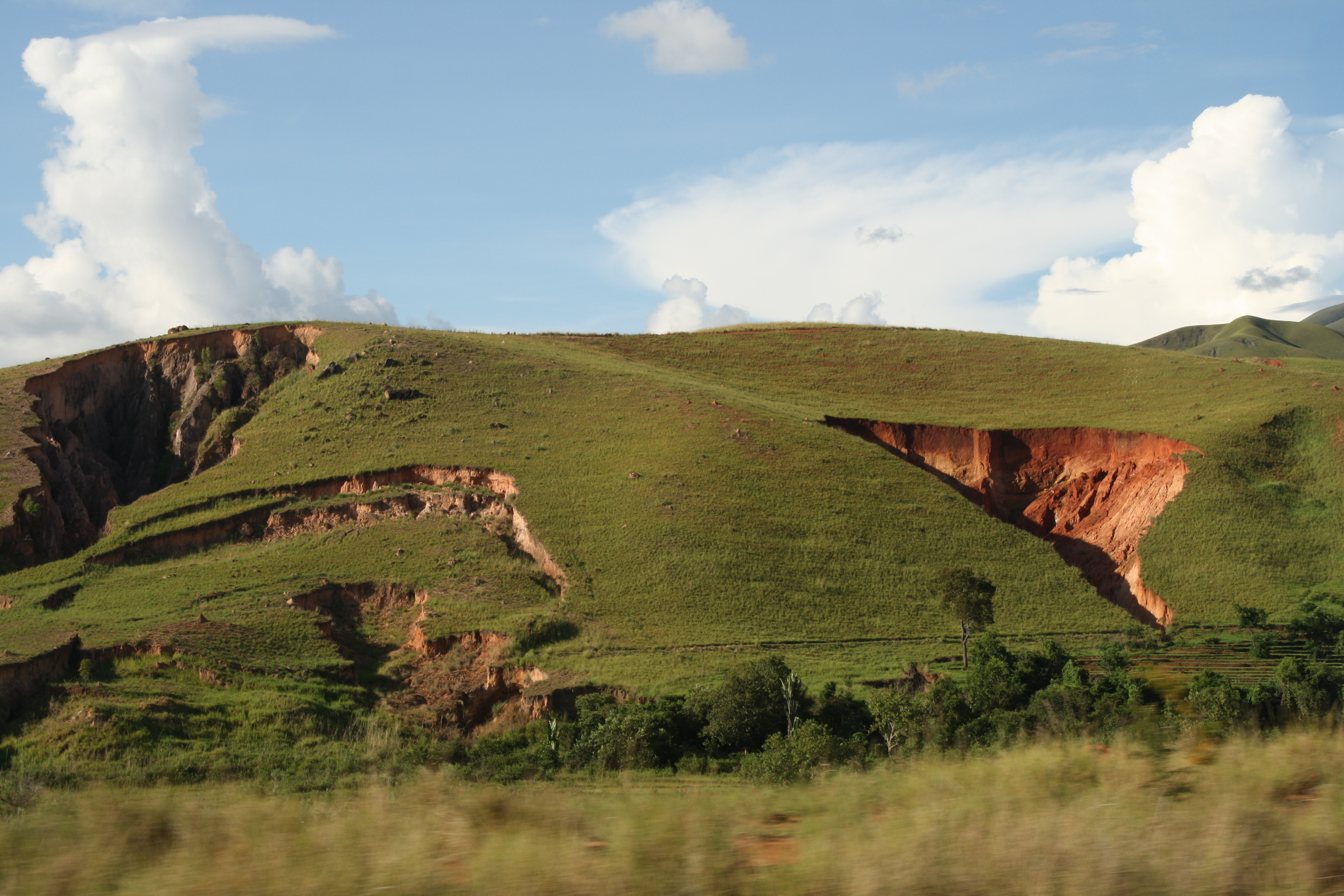
Soil erosion in Madagascar

According to UNESCO as of the year 2024, 75% of soils are degraded affecting 3.2 billion people. By the year 2050 the share of degraded land can rise to 90%, if current trends continue. During the years 2015-2019, around 100 million hectares of soil were degraded every year.

Lal and Stewart estimated global loss of agricultural land by degradation and abandonment at 12 million hectares per year. In contrast, according to Scherr, GLASOD (Global Assessment of Human-Induced Soil Degradation, under the UN Environment Programme) estimated that 6 million hectares of agricultural land per year had been lost to soil degradation since the mid-1940s, and she noted that this magnitude is similar to earlier estimates by Dudal and by Rozanov et al. Such losses are attributable not only to soil erosion, but also to salinization, loss of nutrients and organic matter, acidification, compaction, waterlogging and subsidence. Human-induced land degradation tends to be particularly serious in dry regions. Focusing on soil properties, Oldeman estimated that about 19 million square kilometers of global land area had been degraded; Dregne and Chou, who included degradation of vegetation cover as well as soil, estimated about 36 million square kilometers degraded in the world's dry regions. Despite estimated losses of agricultural land, the amount of arable land used in crop production globally increased by about 9% from 1961 to 2012, and is estimated to have been 1.396 billion hectares in 2012.

Global average soil erosion rates are thought to be high, and erosion rates on conventional cropland generally exceed estimates of soil production rates, usually by more than an order of magnitude. In the US, sampling for erosion estimates by the US NRCS (Natural Resources Conservation Service) is statistically based, and estimation uses the Universal Soil Loss Equation and Wind Erosion Equation. For 2010, annual average soil loss by sheet, rill and wind erosion on non-federal US land was estimated to be 10.7 t/ha on cropland and 1.9 t/ha on pasture land; the average soil erosion rate on US cropland had been reduced by about 34% since 1982. No-till and low-till practices have become increasingly common on North American cropland used for production of grains such as wheat and barley. On uncultivated cropland, the recent average total soil loss has been 2.2 t/ha per year. In comparison with agriculture using conventional cultivation, it has been suggested that, because no-till agriculture produces erosion rates much closer to soil production rates, it could provide a foundation for sustainable agriculture.

Land degradation is a process in which the value of the biophysical environment is affected by a combination of human-induced processes acting upon the land. It is viewed as any change or disturbance to the land perceived to be deleterious or undesirable. Natural hazards are excluded as a cause; however human activities can indirectly affect phenomena such as floods and bush fires. This is considered to be an important topic of the 21st century due to the implications land degradation has upon agronomic productivity, the environment, and its effects on food security. It is estimated that up to 40% of the world's agricultural land is seriously degraded.

==== Meat production ====
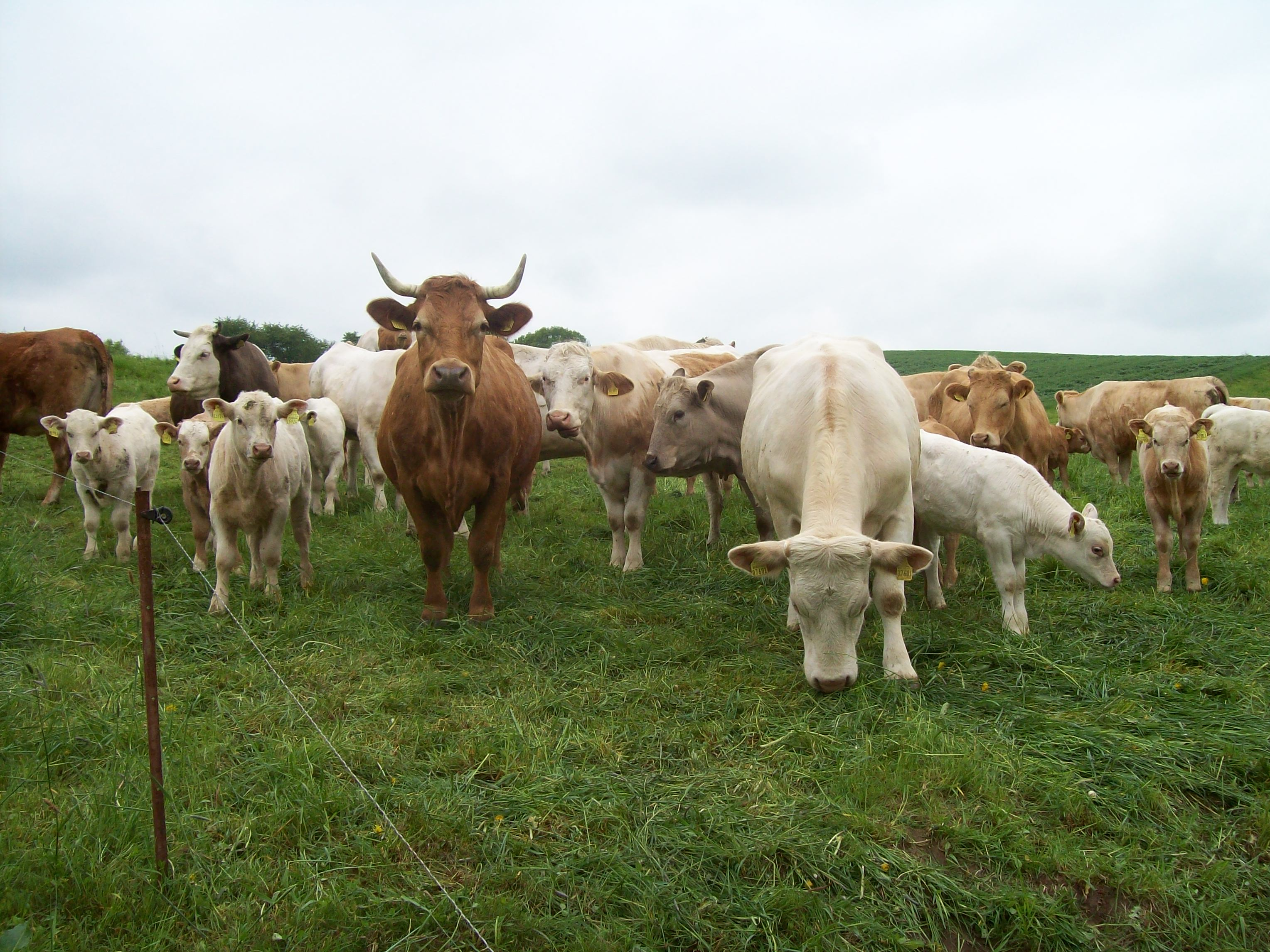
Worldwide, the animal industry provides only 18% of calories, but uses 83% of agricultural land and emits 58% of food's greenhouse gas emissions.

Wild mammals make up only four percent of global mammal biomass. Livestock domesticated by humans, as well as the biomass of humans themselves, constitute the other 96% of mammal biomass globally.

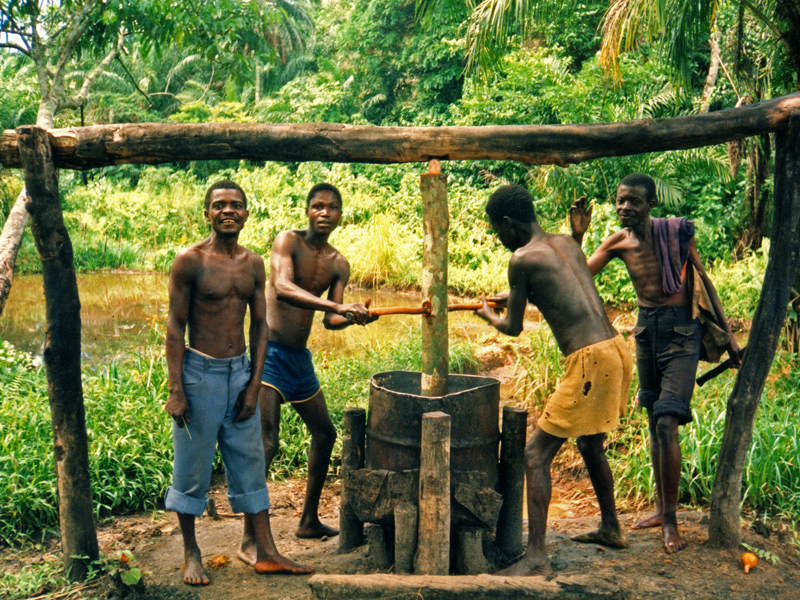
A village palm oil press "malaxeur" in Bandundu, Democratic Republic of the Congo.

Environmental impacts associated with meat production include use of fossil energy, water and land resources, greenhouse gas emissions, and in some instances, rainforest clearing, water pollution and species endangerment, among other adverse effects. Steinfeld et al. of the FAO estimated that 18% of global anthropogenic GHG (greenhouse gas) emissions (estimated as 100-year carbon dioxide equivalents) are associated in some way with livestock production. FAO data indicate that meat accounted for 26% of global livestock product tonnage in 2011.

Globally, enteric fermentation (mostly in ruminant livestock) accounts for about 27% of anthropogenic methane emissions, Despite methane's 100-year global warming potential, recently estimated at 28 without and 34 with climate-carbon feedbacks, methane emission is currently contributing relatively little to global warming. Although reduction of methane emissions would have a rapid effect on warming, the expected effect would be small. Other anthropogenic GHG emissions associated with livestock production include carbon dioxide from fossil fuel consumption (mostly for production, harvesting and transport of feed), and nitrous oxide emissions associated with the use of nitrogenous fertilizers, growing of nitrogen-fixing legume vegetation and manure management. Management practices that can mitigate GHG emissions from production of livestock and feed have been identified.

Considerable water use is associated with meat production, mostly because of water used in production of vegetation that provides feed. There are several published estimates of water use associated with livestock and meat production, but the amount of water use assignable to such production is seldom estimated. For example, "green water" use is evapotranspirational use of soil water that has been provided directly by precipitation; and "green water" has been estimated to account for 94% of global beef cattle production's "water footprint", and on rangeland, as much as 99.5% of the water use associated with beef production is "green water".

Impairment of water quality by manure and other substances in runoff and infiltrating water is a concern, especially where intensive livestock production is carried out. In the US, in a comparison of 32 industries, the livestock industry was found to have a relatively good record of compliance with environmental regulations pursuant to the Clean Water Act and Clean Air Act, but pollution issues from large livestock operations can sometimes be serious where violations occur. Various measures have been suggested by the US Environmental Protection Agency, among others, which can help reduce livestock damage to streamwater quality and riparian environments.

Changes in livestock production practices influence the environmental impact of meat production, as illustrated by some beef data. In the US beef production system, practices prevailing in 2007 are estimated to have involved 8.6% less fossil fuel use, 16% less greenhouse gas emissions (estimated as 100-year carbon dioxide equivalents), 12% less withdrawn water use and 33% less land use, per unit mass of beef produced, than in 1977. From 1980 to 2012 in the US, while population increased by 38%, the small ruminant inventory decreased by 42%, the cattle-and-calves inventory decreased by 17%, and methane emissions from livestock decreased by 18%; yet despite the reduction in cattle numbers, US beef production increased over that period.

Some impacts of meat-producing livestock may be considered environmentally beneficial. These include waste reduction by conversion of human-inedible crop residues to food, use of livestock as an alternative to herbicides for control of invasive and noxious weeds and other vegetation management, use of animal manure as fertilizer as a substitute for those synthetic fertilizers that require considerable fossil fuel use for manufacture, grazing use for wildlife habitat enhancement, and carbon sequestration in response to grazing practices, among others. Conversely, according to some studies appearing in peer-reviewed journals, the growing demand for meat is contributing to significant biodiversity loss as it is a significant driver of deforestation and habitat destruction. Moreover, the 2019 Global Assessment Report on Biodiversity and Ecosystem Services by IPBES also warns that ever increasing land use for meat production plays a significant role in biodiversity loss. A 2006 Food and Agriculture Organization report, Livestock's Long Shadow, found that around 26% of the planet's terrestrial surface is devoted to livestock grazing.

==== Palm oil ====
Palm oil is a type of vegetable oil, found in oil palm trees, which are native to West and Central Africa. Initially used in foods in developing countries, palm oil is now also used in food, cosmetic and other types of products in other nations as well. Over one-third of vegetable oil consumed globally is palm oil.

==== Habitat loss ====
The consumption of palm oil in food, domestic and cosmetic products all over the world means there is a high demand for it. To meet this, oil palm plantations are created, which means removing natural forests to clear space. This deforestation has taken place in Asia, Latin America and West Africa, with Malaysia and Indonesia holding 90% of global oil palm trees. These forests are home to a wide range of species, including many endangered animals, ranging from birds to rhinos and tigers. Since 2000, 47% of deforestation has been for the purpose of growing oil palm plantations, with around 877,000 acres being affected per year.

==== Impact on biodiversity ====
Natural forests are extremely biodiverse, with a wide range of organisms using them as their habitat. But oil palm plantations are the opposite. Studies have shown that oil palm plantations have less than 1% of the plant diversity seen in natural forests, and 47–90% less mammal diversity. This is not because of the oil palm itself, but rather because the oil palm is the only habitat provided in the plantations. The plantations are therefore known as a monoculture, whereas natural forests contain a wide variety of flora and fauna, making them highly biodiverse. One of the ways palm oil could be made more sustainable (although it is still not the best option) is through agroforestry, whereby the plantations are made up of multiple types of plants used in trade – such as coffee or cocoa. While these are more biodiverse than monoculture plantations, they are still not as effective as natural forests. In addition to this, agroforestry does not bring as many economic benefits to workers, their families and the surrounding areas.

=== Technology impacts ===
The applications of technology often result in unavoidable and unexpected environmental impacts, which according to the I = PAT equation is measured as resource use or pollution generated per unit GDP. Environmental impacts caused by the application of technology are often perceived as unavoidable for several reasons. First, given that the purpose of many technologies is to exploit, control, or otherwise "improve" upon nature for the perceived benefit of humanity while at the same time, the myriad of processes in nature have been optimized and are continually adjusted by evolution, any disturbance of these natural processes by technology is likely to result in negative environmental consequences.

Second, the conservation of mass principle and the first law of thermodynamics (i.e., conservation of energy) dictate that whenever material resources or energy are moved around or manipulated by technology, environmental consequences are inescapable. Third, according to the second law of thermodynamics, order can be increased within a system (such as the human economy) only by increasing disorder or entropy outside the system (i.e., the environment). Thus, technologies can create "order" in the human economy (i.e., order as manifested in buildings, factories, transportation networks, communication systems, etc.) only at the expense of increasing "disorder" in the environment. According to several studies, increased entropy is likely to correlate to negative environmental impacts.

=== Mining industry ===
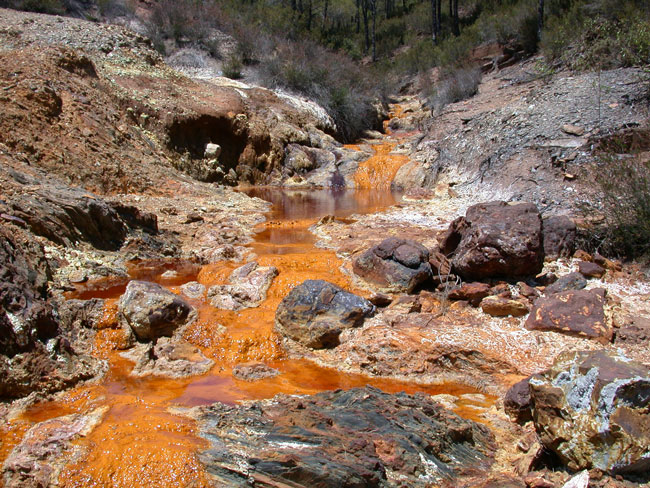
Acid mine drainage in the Rio Tinto River

The environmental impact of mining includes erosion, formation of sinkholes, loss of biodiversity, and contamination of soil, groundwater and surface water by chemicals from mining processes. In some cases, additional forest logging is done in the vicinity of mines to increase the available room for the storage of the created debris and soil.

Even though plants need some heavy metals for their growth, excess of these metals is usually toxic to them. Plants that are polluted with heavy metals usually depict reduced growth, yield and performance. Pollution by heavy metals decreases the soil organic matter composition resulting in a decline in soil nutrients which then leads to a decline in the growth of plants or even death.

Besides creating environmental damage, the contamination resulting from leakage of chemicals also affect the health of the local population. Mining companies in some countries are required to follow environmental and rehabilitation codes, ensuring the area mined is returned to close to its original state. Some mining methods may have significant environmental and public health effects. Heavy metals usually exhibit toxic effects towards the soil biota, and this is through the affection of the microbial processes and decreases the number as well as activity of soil microorganisms. Low concentration of heavy metals also has high chances of inhibiting the plant's physiological metabolism.

=== Energy industry ===
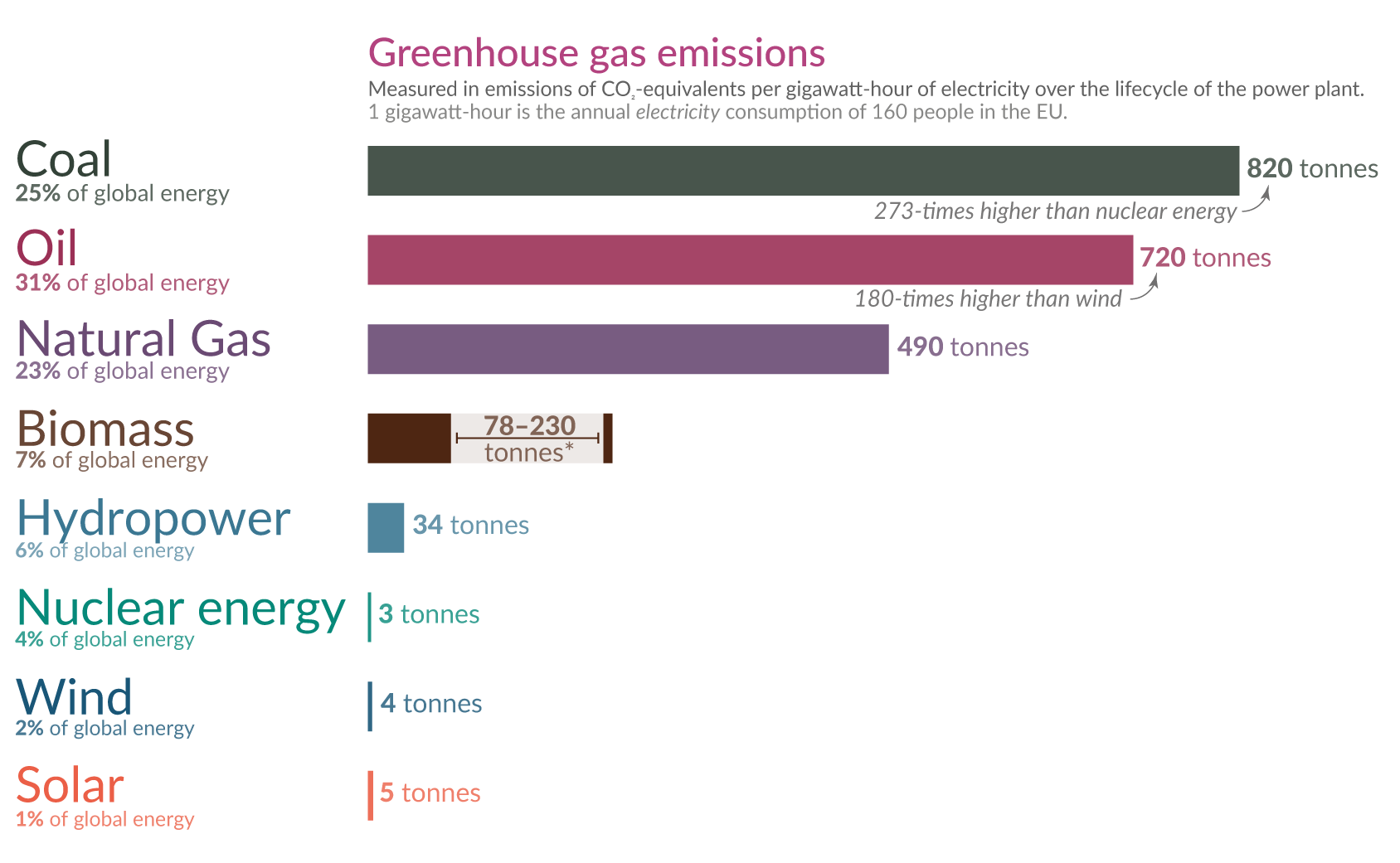
Greenhouse gas emissions per energy source.

The environmental impact of energy harvesting and consumption is diverse. In recent years there has been a trend towards the increased commercialization of various renewable energy sources.

In the real world, consumption of fossil fuel resources leads to global warming and climate change. However, little change is being made in many parts of the world. If the peak oil theory proves true, more explorations of viable alternative energy sources, could be more friendly to the environment.

Rapidly advancing technologies can achieve a transition of energy generation, water and waste management, and food production towards better environmental and energy usage practices using methods of systems ecology and industrial ecology.

==== Biodiesel ====
The environmental impact of biodiesel includes energy use, greenhouse gas emissions and some other kinds of pollution. A joint life cycle analysis by the US Department of Agriculture and the US Department of Energy found that substituting 100% biodiesel for petroleum diesel in buses reduced life cycle consumption of petroleum by 95%. Biodiesel reduced net emissions of carbon dioxide by 78.45%, compared with petroleum diesel. In urban buses, biodiesel reduced particulate emissions 32 percent, carbon monoxide emissions 35 percent, and emissions of sulfur oxides 8%, relative to life cycle emissions associated with use of petroleum diesel. Life cycle emissions of hydrocarbons were 35% higher and emission of various nitrogen oxides (NOx) were 13.5% higher with biodiesel. Life cycle analyses by the Argonne National Laboratory have indicated reduced fossil energy use and reduced greenhouse gas emissions with biodiesel, compared with petroleum diesel use. Biodiesel derived from various vegetable oils (e.g. canola or soybean oil), is readily biodegradable in the environment compared with petroleum diesel.

==== Coal mining and burning ====
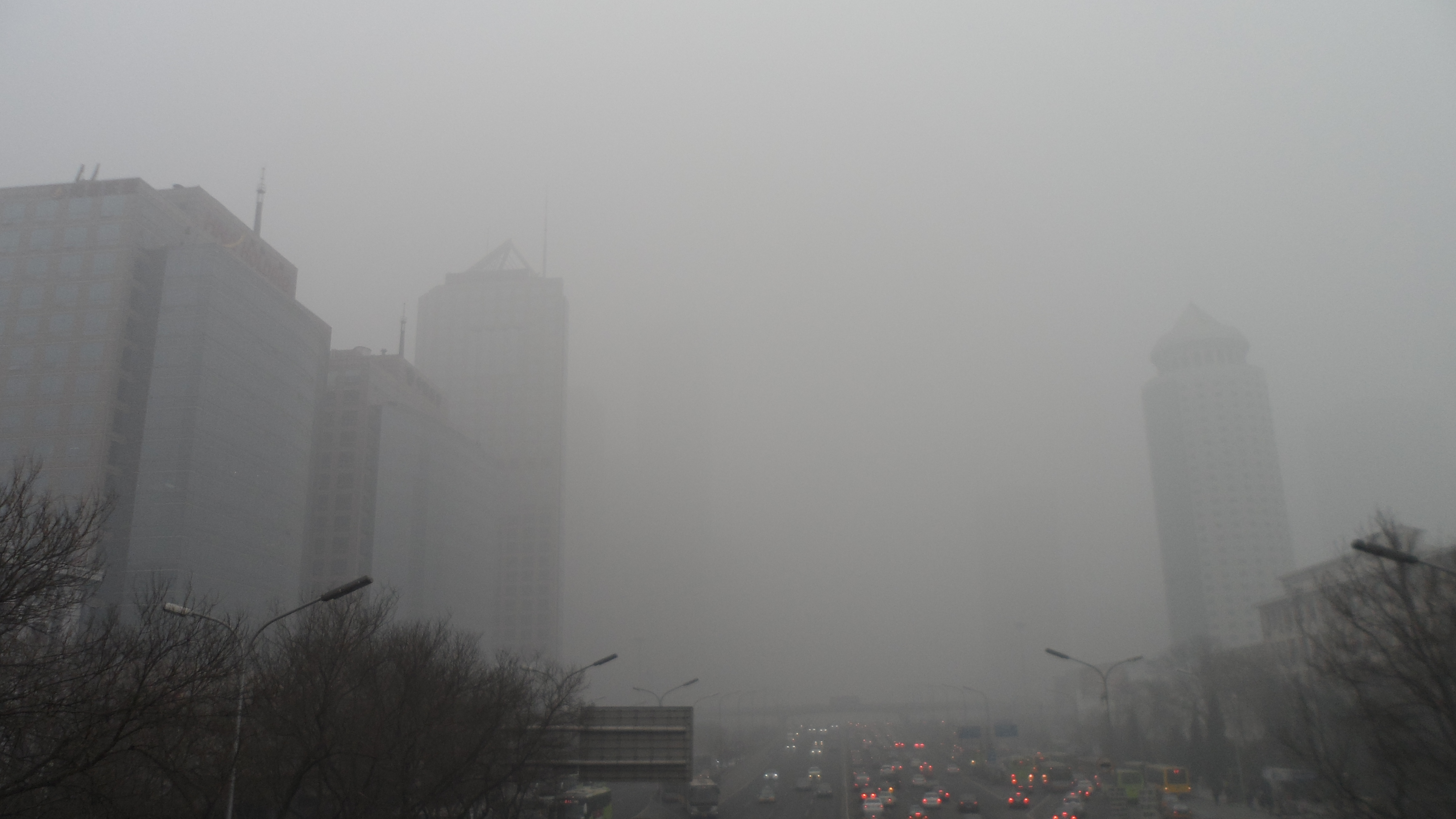
Smog in Beijing, China

The environmental impact of coal mining and burning is diverse. Legislation passed by the US Congress in 1990 required the United States Environmental Protection Agency (EPA) to issue a plan to alleviate toxic air pollution from coal-fired power plants. After delay and litigation, the EPA now has a court-imposed deadline of 16 March 2011, to issue its report. Surface coal mining has the greatest impact on the environment due to its unique extraction process requiring drilling and blasting, which releases macro amounts of airborne particles into the air. This airborne particulate matter releases harmful toxins into the atmosphere such as ammonia, carbon monoxide, and nitrogen oxides. These toxins then lead to many detrimental health effects such as respiratory illnesses and cardiovascular disease.

Although coal is the most widely utilized source of energy around the world, the burning of coal emits poisonous toxins into the air, leading to various health ailments of the skin, blood and lung diseases, and various forms of cancer, while also contributing to global warming by the emission of these toxins into the environment. The technology for mining activity has advanced over the years, leading to an increase in mine waste leading to more pollution problems, according to the Safe Drinking Water Foundation Studies that have been conducted in various countries like India, have proven that coal mining has a detrimental effect on other biotic and abiotic factors including vegetation and soil, leading to a decrease in plant populations in mining sites

==== Electricity generation ====
Electric power systems consist of generation plants of different energy sources, transmission networks, and distribution lines. Each of these components can have environmental impacts at multiple stages of their development and use including in their construction, during the generation of electricity, and in their decommissioning and disposal. These impacts can be split into operational impacts (fuel sourcing, global atmospheric and localized pollution) and construction impacts (manufacturing, installation, decommissioning, and disposal). All forms of electricity generation have some form of environmental impact, but coal-fired power is the dirtiest. This page is organized by energy source and includes impacts such as water usage, emissions, local pollution, and wildlife displacement.

==== Nuclear power ====
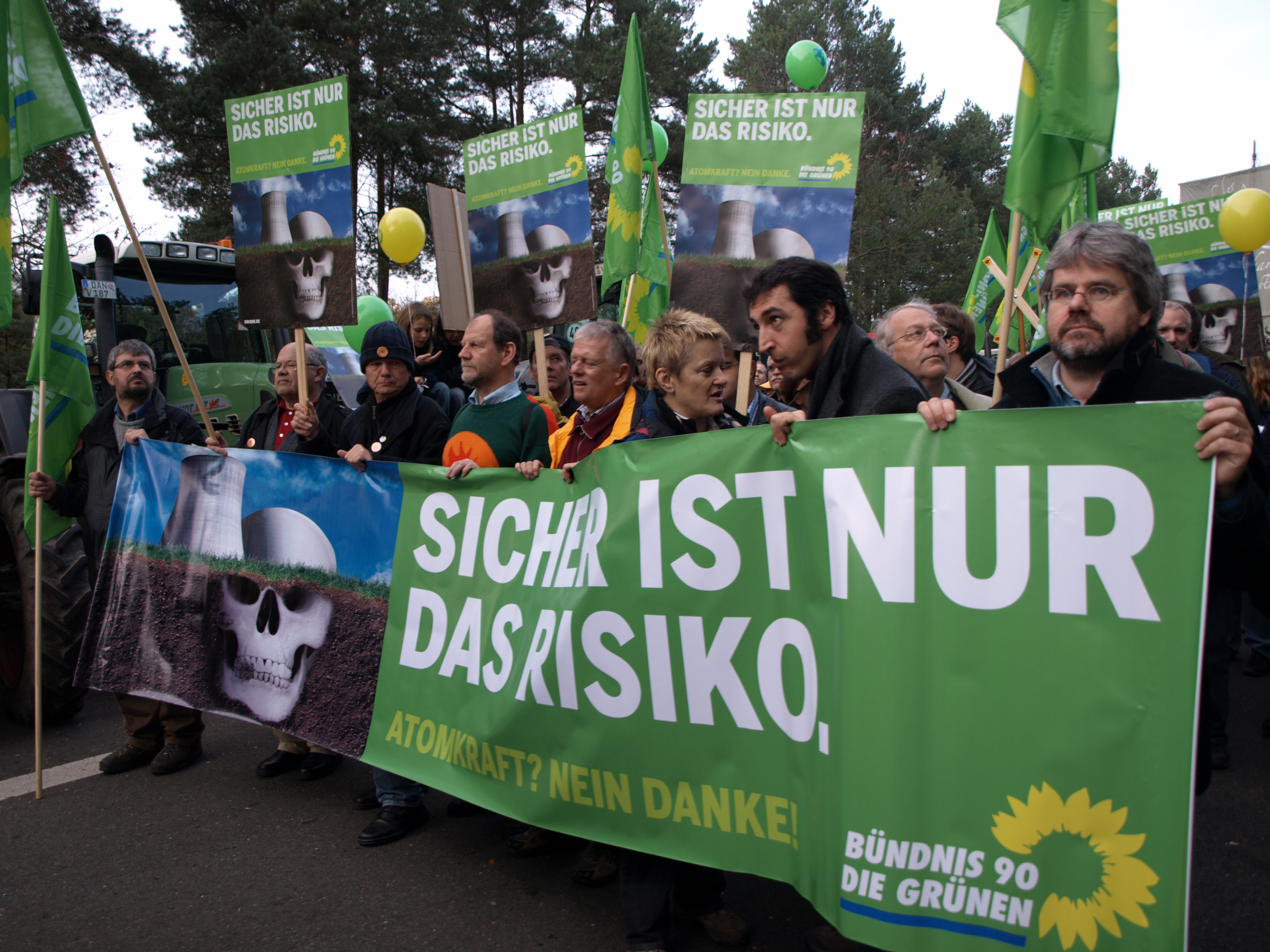
Anti-nuclear protest near nuclear waste disposal centre at Gorleben in northern Germany

The environmental impact of nuclear power results from the nuclear fuel cycle processes including mining, processing, transporting and storing fuel and radioactive fuel waste. Released radioisotopes pose a health danger to human populations, animals and plants as radioactive particles enter organisms through various transmission routes.

Radiation is a carcinogen and causes numerous effects on living organisms and systems. The environmental impacts of nuclear power plant disasters such as the Chernobyl disaster, the Fukushima Daiichi nuclear disaster and the Three Mile Island accident, among others, persist indefinitely, though several other factors contributed to these events including improper management of failsafe systems and natural disasters putting uncommon stress on the generators. The radioactive decay rate of particles varies greatly, dependent upon the nuclear properties of a particular isotope. Radioactive Plutonium-244 has a half-life of 80.8 million years, which indicates the time duration required for half of a given sample to decay, though very little plutonium-244 is produced in the nuclear fuel cycle and lower half-life materials have lower activity thus giving off less dangerous radiation.

==== Oil shale industry ====
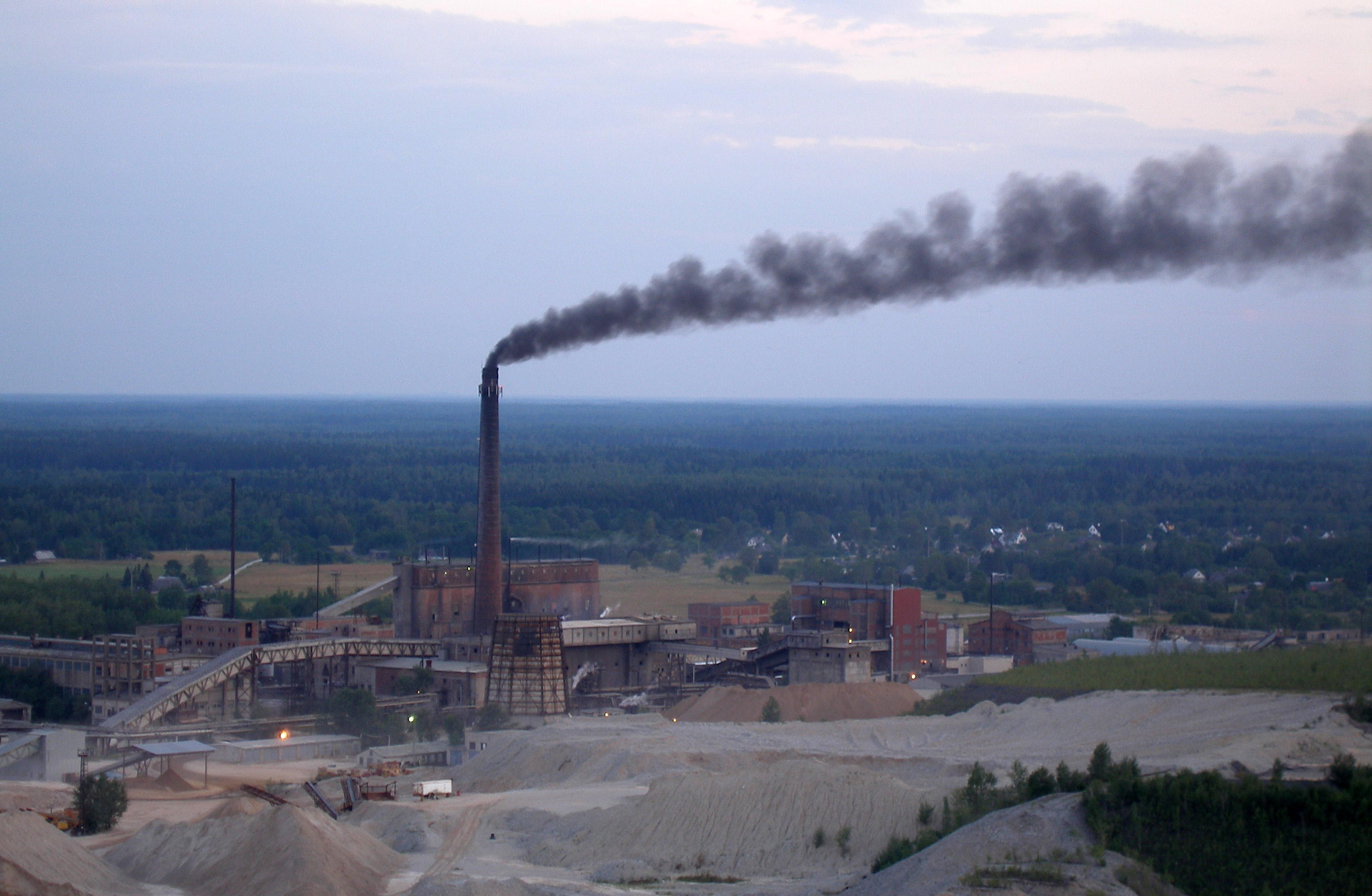
Kiviõli Oil Shale Processing & Chemicals Plant in Ida-Virumaa, Estonia.

The environmental impact of the oil shale industry includes the consideration of issues such as land use, waste management, water and air pollution caused by the extraction and processing of oil shale. Surface mining of oil shale deposits causes the usual environmental impacts of open-pit mining. In addition, the combustion and thermal processing generate waste material, which must be disposed of, and harmful atmospheric emissions, including carbon dioxide, a major greenhouse gas. Experimental in-situ conversion processes and carbon capture and storage technologies may reduce some of these concerns in future, but may raise others, such as the pollution of groundwater.

==== Petroleum ====
The environmental impact of petroleum is often negative because it is toxic to almost all forms of life. Petroleum, a common word for oil or natural gas, is closely linked to virtually all aspects of present society, especially for transportation and heating for both homes and for commercial activities.

==== Reservoirs ====
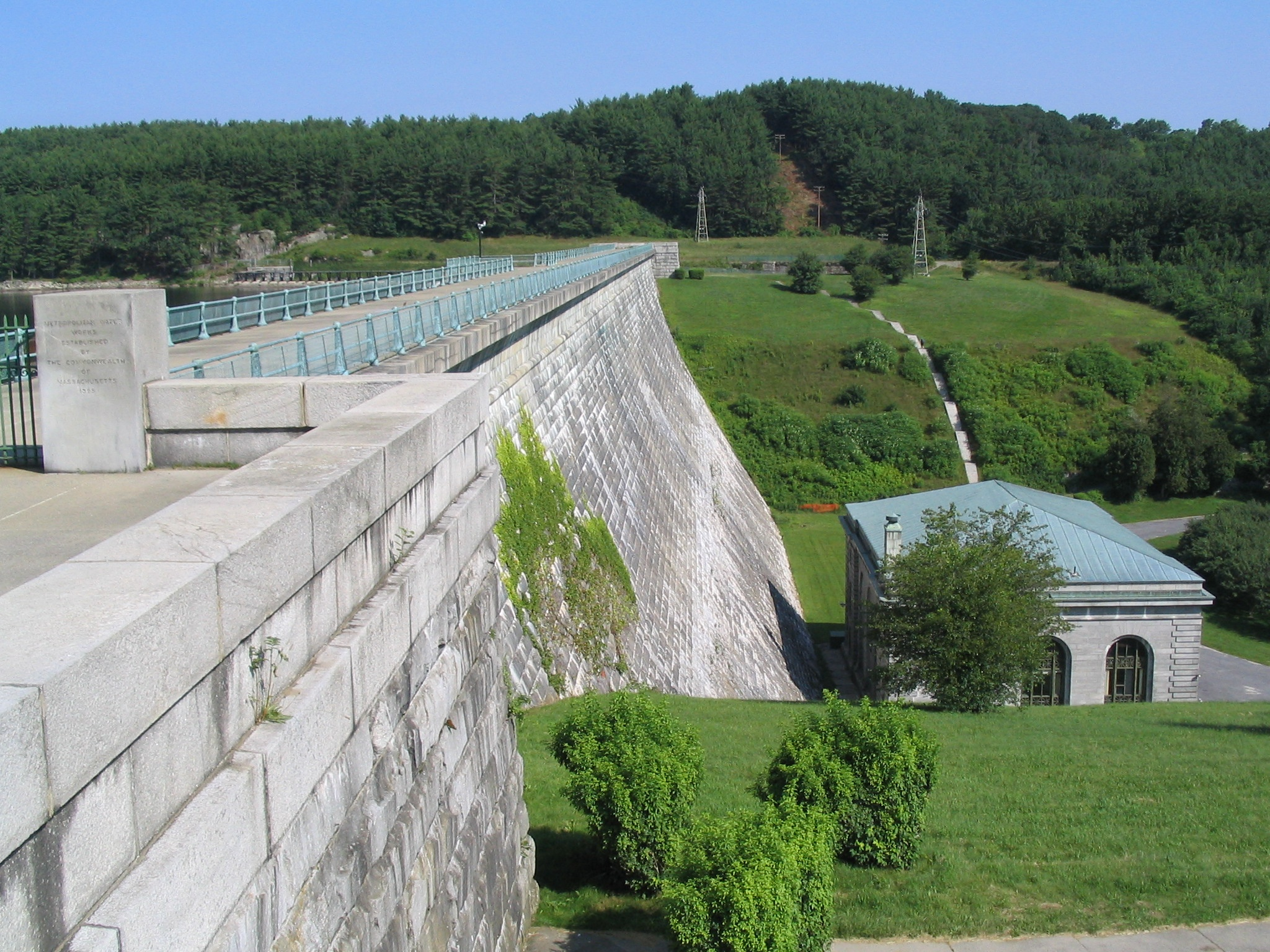
The Wachusett Dam in Clinton, Massachusetts

The environmental impact of reservoirs is coming under ever increasing scrutiny as the world demand for water and energy increases and the number and size of reservoirs increases.

Dams and the reservoirs can be used to supply drinking water, generate hydroelectric power, increase the water supply for irrigation, provide recreational opportunities and flood control. However, adverse environmental and sociological impacts have also been identified during and after many reservoir constructions. Although the impact varies greatly between different dams and reservoirs, common criticisms include preventing sea-run fish from reaching their historical mating grounds, less access to water downstream, and a smaller catch for fishing communities in the area. Advances in technology have provided solutions to many negative impacts of dams but these advances are often not viewed as worth investing in if not required by law or under the threat of fines.

Whether reservoir projects are ultimately beneficial or detrimental—to both the environment and surrounding human populations— has been debated since the 1960s and probably long before that. In 1960 the construction of Llyn Celyn and the flooding of Capel Celyn provoked political uproar which continues to this day. More recently, the construction of Three Gorges Dam and other similar projects throughout Asia, Africa and Latin America have generated considerable environmental and political debate.

==== Wind power ====
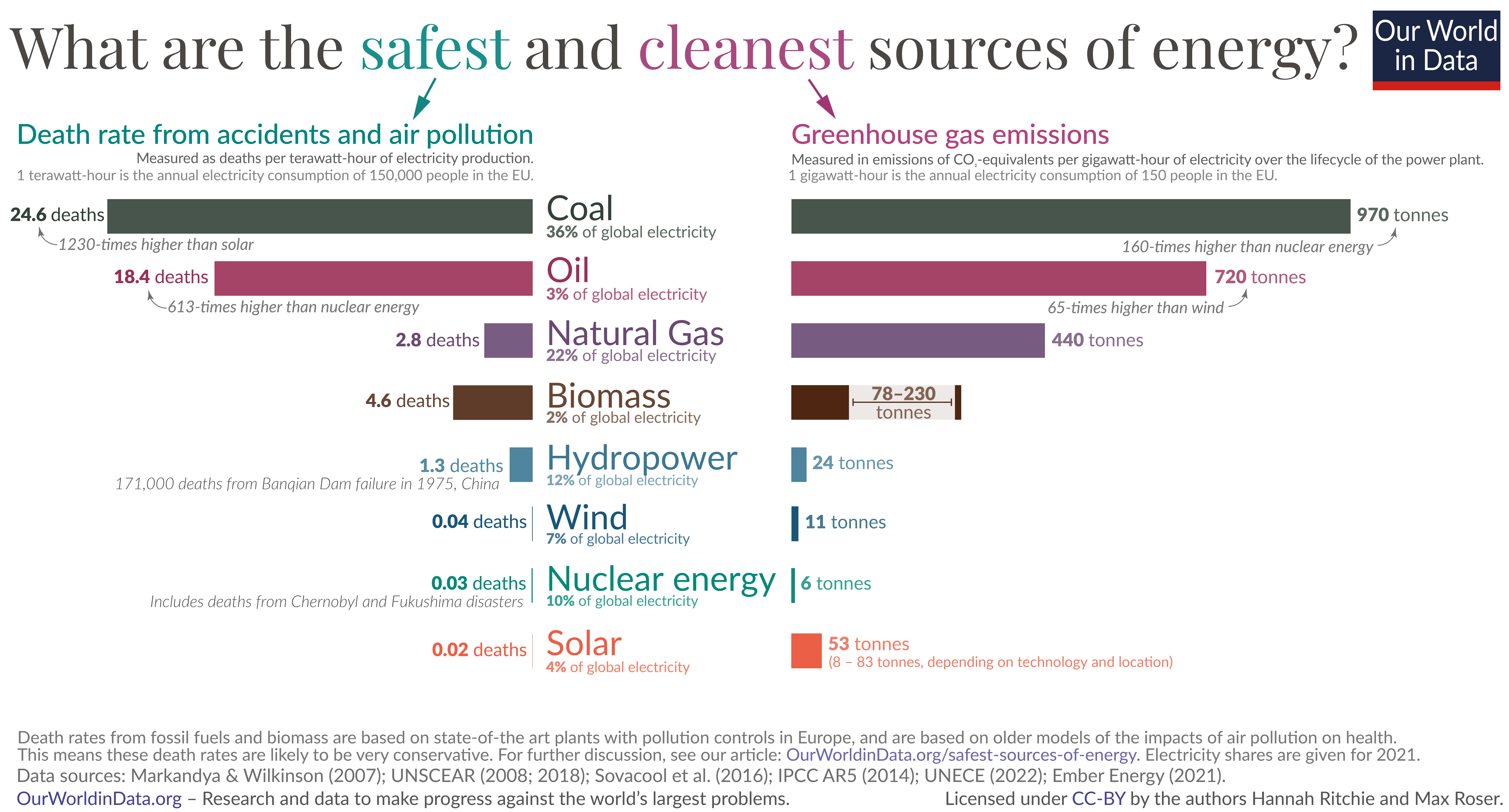
Per unit of energy, nuclear and wind power have minimal greenhouse emissions, and together with solar are the least deadly sources of energy.

The environmental impact of electricity generation from wind power is minor when compared to that of fossil fuel power. Wind power consumes no fuel, and emits no air pollution, unlike fossil fuels. Wind turbines have some of the lowest global warming potential per unit of electricity generated: far less greenhouse gas is emitted than for the average unit of electricity, so wind power helps limit climate change. Emissions from production of a turbine are recouped in less than a year of operation, as it replaces gas or coal power.

Onshore (on-land) wind farms can have a significant visual impact and impact on the landscape. Due to a very low surface power density and spacing requirements, wind farms typically need to be spread over more land than other power stations. Conflicts arise especially in scenic and culturally-important landscapes. Siting restrictions, such as setbacks, may be implemented to limit the impact. The land between the turbines and access roads can still be used for farming and grazing. Some wind farms are opposed for potentially spoiling protected scenic areas, archaeological landscapes and heritage sites.

Many wind turbine blades are made of fiberglass and some only had a lifetime of 10 to 20 years. Previously, there was no market for recycling these old blades, and they were commonly disposed of in landfills. Because blades are hollow, they take up a large volume compared to their mass. Since 2019, some landfill operators have begun requiring blades to be crushed before being landfilled. Blade end-of-life is complicated, and blades manufactured in the 2020s are more likely to be designed to be completely recyclable.

Wind turbines also generate noise. At a distance of 300 metres (980 ft) this may be around 45 dB, which is slightly louder than a refrigerator. At 1.5 km (1 mi) distance they become inaudible. Some people who live very close to wind turbines have reported negative health effects, but peer-reviewed research has generally not supported these claims. Pile-driving to construct non-floating wind farms is noisy underwater, but in operation offshore wind is much quieter than ships.

Habitat loss and fragmentation are the greatest potential impacts on wildlife of onshore wind farms, but the worldwide ecological impact is minimal. Thousands of birds and bats, including rare species, have been killed by wind turbine blades, though wind turbines are responsible for far fewer bird deaths than fossil-fueled power stations when climate change effects are included. The effects of wind turbines on birds can be mitigated with proper wildlife monitoring.

=== Manufacturing ===
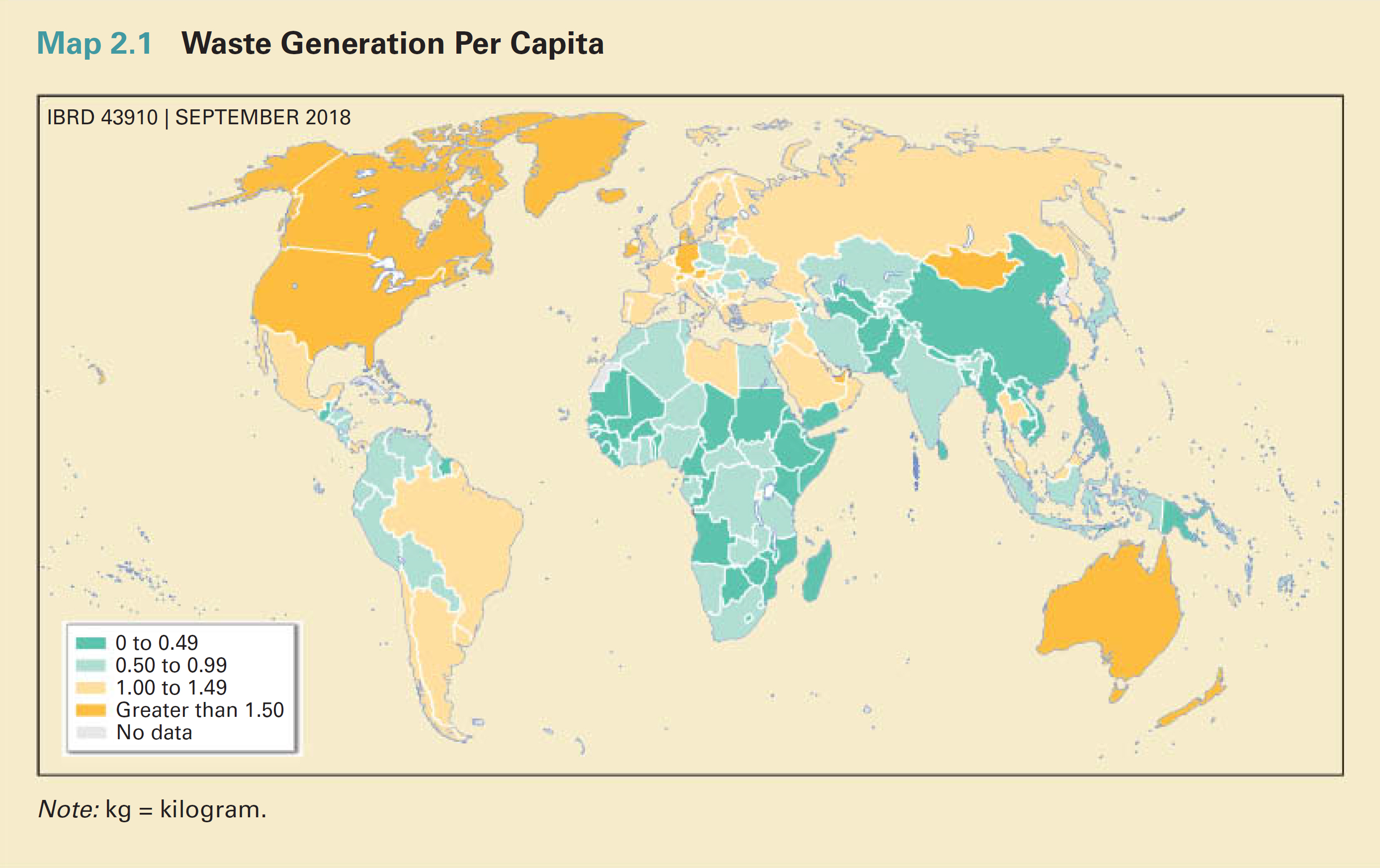
Waste generation, measured in kilograms per person per day

==== Cleaning agents ====
The environmental impact of cleaning agents is diverse. In recent years, measures have been taken to reduce these effects.

==== Nanotechnology ====
Nanotechnology's environmental impact can be split into two aspects: the potential for nanotechnological innovations to help improve the environment, and the possibly novel type of pollution that nanotechnological materials might cause if released into the environment. As nanotechnology is an emerging field, there is great debate regarding to what extent industrial and commercial use of nanomaterials will affect organisms and ecosystems.

==== Paint ====
The environmental impact of paint is diverse. Traditional painting materials and processes can have harmful effects on the environment, including those from the use of lead and other additives. Measures can be taken to reduce environmental impact, including accurately estimating paint quantities so that wastage is minimized, use of paints, coatings, painting accessories and techniques that are environmentally preferred. The United States Environmental Protection Agency guidelines and Green Star ratings are some of the standards that can be applied.

==== Paper ====
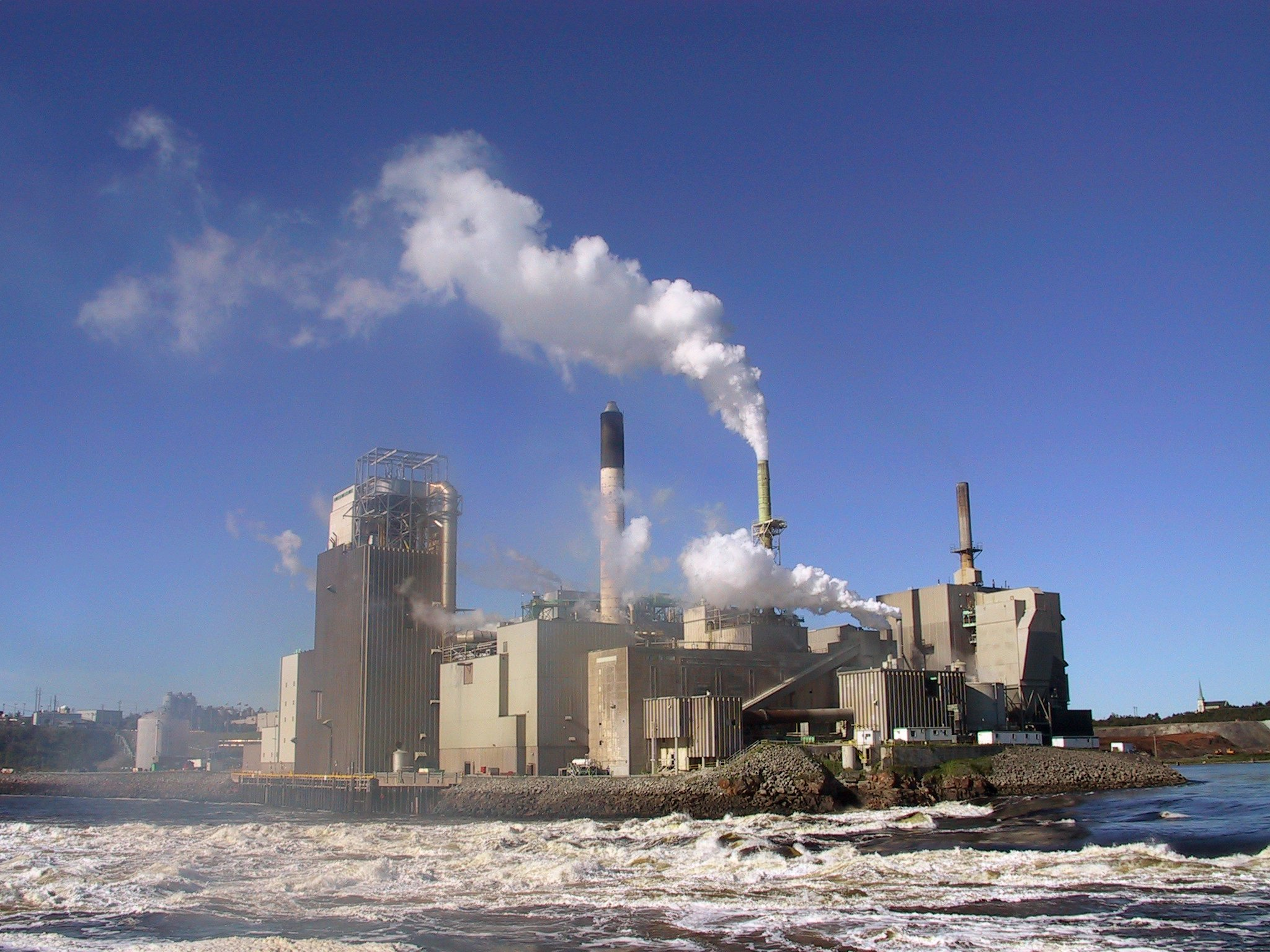
A pulp and paper mill in New Brunswick, Canada. Although pulp and paper manufacturing requires large amounts of energy, a portion of it comes from burning wood residue.

The environmental impact of paper is significant. This has led to changes in industry and behaviour at both business and personal levels. With the use of modern technology such as the printing press and the highly mechanized harvesting of wood, disposable paper became a relatively cheap commodity, which led to a high level of consumption and waste. The rise in global environmental issues such as air and water pollution, climate change, overflowing landfills and clearcutting have all led to increased government regulations. There is now a trend towards sustainability in the pulp and paper industry as it moves to reduce clearcutting, water use, greenhouse gas emissions, and fossil fuel consumption and to clean up its influence on local water supplies and air pollution.

Environmental product declarations or product scorecards are available to collect and evaluate the environmental and social performance of paper products, such as the Paper Calculator, Environmental Paper Assessment Tool (EPAT), or Paper Profile.

Both the U.S. and Canada generate interactive maps of environmental indicators which show pollution emissions of individual facilities.

==== Plastics ====
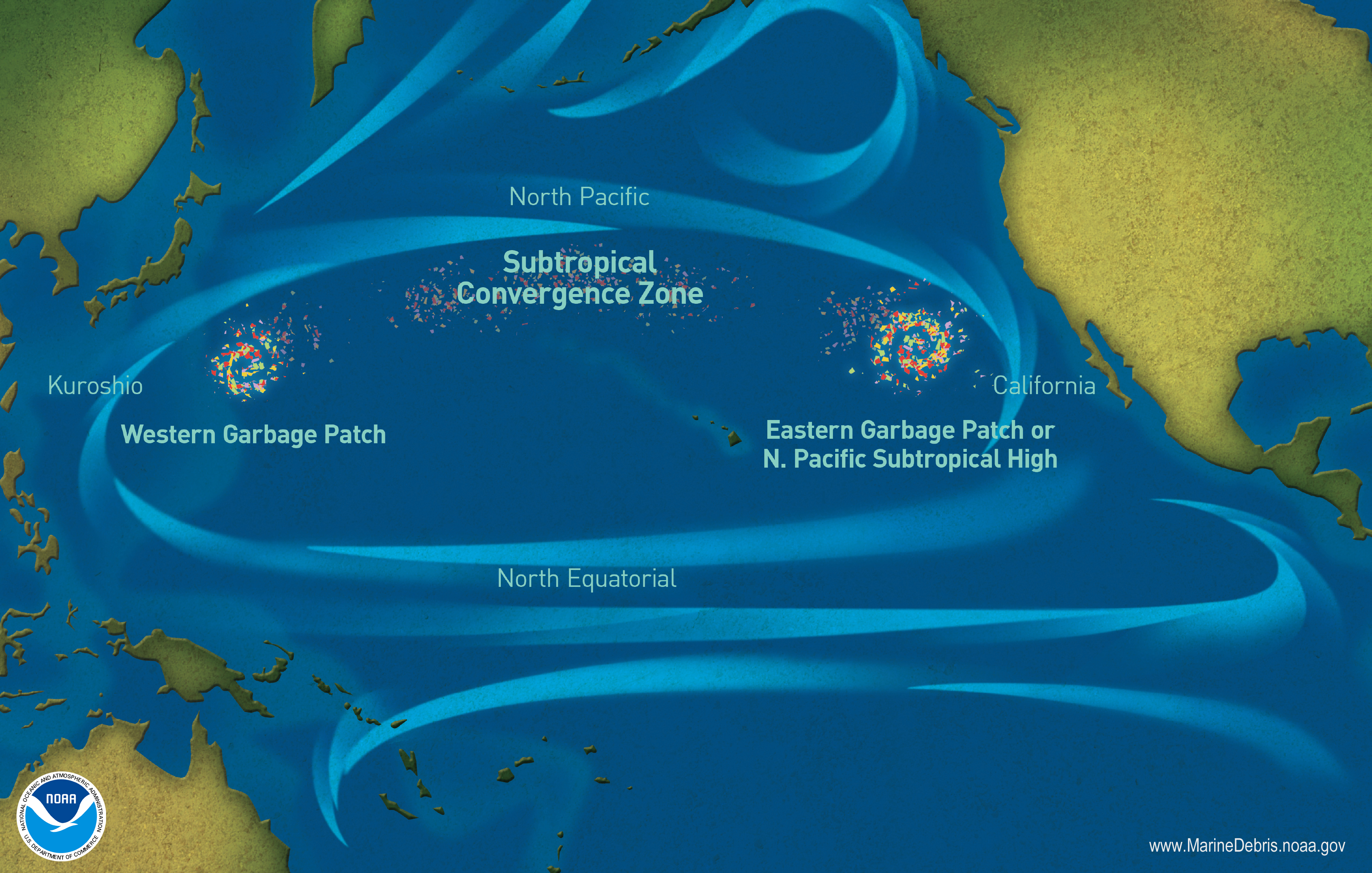
Great Pacific Garbage Patch

Some scientists suggest that by 2050 there could be more plastic than fish in the oceans. A December 2020 study published in Nature found that human-made materials, or anthropogenic mass, exceeds all living biomass on Earth, with plastic alone outweighing the mass of all terrestrial and marine animals combined.

==== Pesticides ====
The environmental impact of pesticides is often greater than what is intended by those who use them. Over 98% of sprayed insecticides and 95% of herbicides reach a destination other than their target species, including nontarget species, air, water, bottom sediments, and food. Pesticide contaminates land and water when it escapes from production sites and storage tanks, when it runs off from fields, when it is discarded, when it is sprayed aerially, and when it is sprayed into water to kill algae.

The amount of pesticide that migrates from the intended application area is influenced by the particular chemical's properties: its propensity for binding to soil, its vapor pressure, its water solubility, and its resistance to being broken down over time. Factors in the soil, such as its texture, its ability to retain water, and the amount of organic matter contained in it, also affect the amount of pesticide that will leave the area. Some pesticides contribute to global warming and the depletion of the ozone layer.

==== Pharmaceuticals and personal care ====
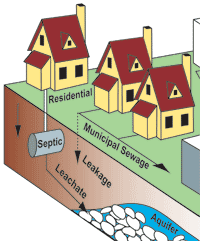
Methods of PPCP entry into the environment from residential homes via septic and sewage systems

The environmental effects of pharmaceutical and personal care products (PPCPs) has been of concern since at least the 1990s. PPCPs include substances used by individuals for personal health or cosmetic reasons and the products used by agribusiness to boost growth or health of livestock. More than twenty million tons of PPCPs are produced every year. The European Union has declared that pharmacological residues with the potential for contamination of water and the soil are "priority substances".^{[3]}

PPCPs have been detected in waters throughout the world. More research is needed to evaluate the risks of toxicity, persistence, and bioaccumulation, but current research shows that personal care products affect the environment and other species, such as coral reefs and fish. PPCPs encompass environmental persistent pharmaceutical pollutants (EPPPs) and are one type of persistent organic pollutants. They are not removed in conventional sewage treatment plants but require a fourth treatment stage which not many plants have.

In 2022, the most comprehensive study of pharmacological pollution of the world's rivers showed that it threatens "environmental and/or human health in more than a quarter of the studied locations". It investigated 1052 sampling sites along 258 rivers in 104 countries, representing pollution of rivers serving 470 million people. It showed that "the most contaminated sites were in low- to middle-income countries and were associated with areas with poor wastewater and waste management infrastructure and pharmaceutical product manufacture" and listed the most frequently detected and concentrated pharmaceutical products.

=== Transport ===
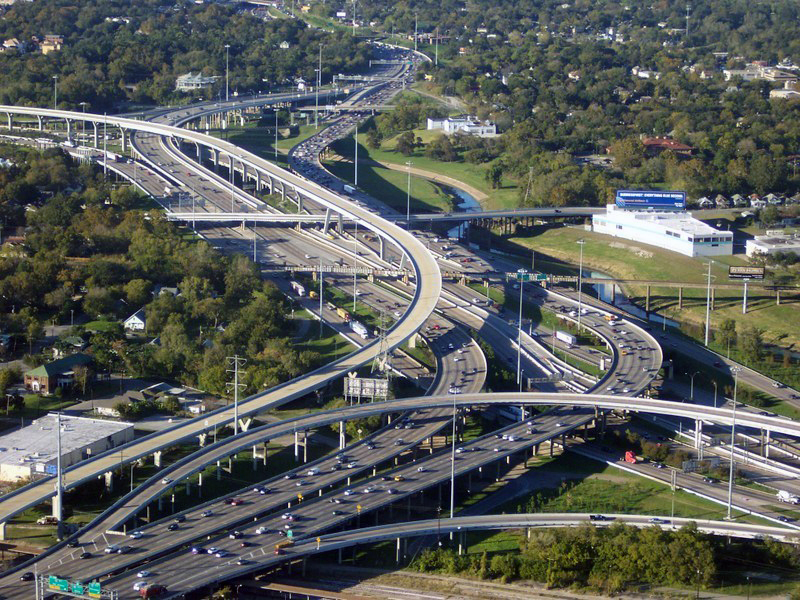
Interstate 10 and Interstate 45 near downtown Houston, Texas in the United States

The environmental impact of transport is significant because it is a major user of energy, and burns most of the world's petroleum. This creates air pollution, including nitrous oxides and particulates, and is a significant contributor to global warming through emission of carbon dioxide, for which transport is the fastest-growing emission sector. By subsector, road transport is the largest contributor to global warming.

Environmental regulations in developed countries have reduced the individual vehicles emission; however, this has been offset by an increase in the number of vehicles, and more use of each vehicle. Some pathways to reduce the carbon emissions of road vehicles considerably have been studied. Energy use and emissions vary largely between modes, causing environmentalists to call for a transition from air and road to rail and human-powered transport, and increase transport electrification and energy efficiency.

Other environmental impacts of transport systems include traffic congestion and automobile-oriented urban sprawl, which can consume natural habitat and agricultural lands. By reducing transportation emissions globally, it is predicted that there will be significant positive effects on Earth's air quality, acid rain, smog and climate change.

The health impact of transport emissions is also of concern. A recent survey of the studies on the effect of traffic emissions on pregnancy outcomes has linked exposure to emissions to adverse effects on gestational duration and possibly also intrauterine growth.

==== Aviation ====
The environmental impact of aviation occurs because aircraft engines emit noise, particulates, and gases which contribute to climate change and global dimming. Despite emission reductions from aircraft engines and more fuel-efficient and less polluting turbofan and turboprop engines, the rapid growth of air travel in recent years contributes to an increase in total pollution attributable to aviation. In the EU, greenhouse gas emissions from aviation increased by 87% between 1990 and 2006. Among other factors leading to this phenomenon are the increasing number of hypermobile travellers and social factors that are making air travel commonplace, such as frequent flyer programs.

There is an ongoing debate about possible taxation of air travel and the inclusion of aviation in an emissions trading scheme, with a view to ensuring that the total external costs of aviation are taken into account.

==== Roads ====
The environmental impact of roads includes the local effects of highways (public roads) such as on noise pollution, light pollution, water pollution, habitat destruction/disturbance and local air quality; and the wider effects including climate change from vehicle emissions. The design, construction and management of roads, parking and other related facilities as well as the design and regulation of vehicles can change the impacts to varying degrees.

==== Shipping ====
The environmental impact of shipping includes greenhouse gas emissions and oil pollution. In 2007, carbon dioxide emissions from shipping were estimated at 4 to 5% of the global total, and estimated by the International Maritime Organization (IMO) to rise by up to 72% by 2020 if no action is taken. There is also a potential for introducing invasive species into new areas through shipping, usually by attaching themselves to the ship's hull.

The First Intersessional Meeting of the IMO Working Group on Greenhouse Gas Emissions from Ships took place in Oslo, Norway on 23–27 June 2008. It was tasked with developing the technical basis for the reduction mechanisms that may form part of a future IMO regime to control greenhouse gas emissions from international shipping, and a draft of the actual reduction mechanisms themselves, for further consideration by IMO's Marine Environment Protection Committee (MEPC).

=== Military ===
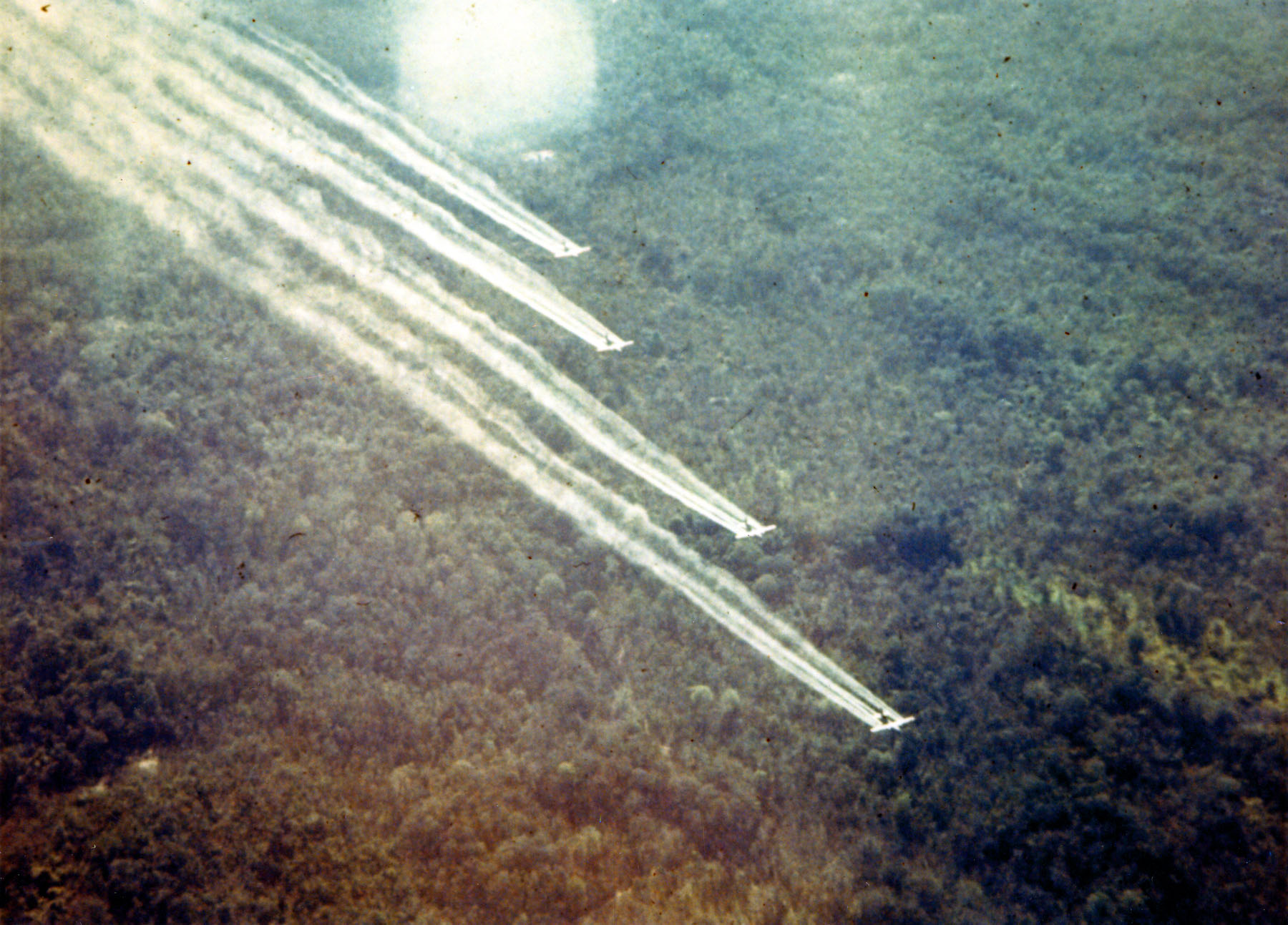
An Agent Orange spray run by aircraft, part of Operation Ranch Hand in the Vietnam War

General military spending and military activities have marked environmental effects. The United States military is considered one of the worst polluters in the world, responsible for over 39,000 sites contaminated with hazardous materials. Several studies have also found a strong positive correlation between higher military spending and higher carbon emissions where increased military spending has a larger effect on increasing carbon emissions in the Global North than in the Global South. Military activities also affect land use and are extremely resource-intensive.

The military does not solely have negative effects on the environment. There are several examples of militaries aiding in land management, conservation, and greening of an area. Additionally, certain military technologies have proven extremely helpful for conservationists and environmental scientists.

As well as the cost to human life and society, there is a significant environmental impact of war. Scorched earth methods during, or after war have been in use for much of recorded history, but with modern technology, war can cause a far greater devastation on the environment. Unexploded ordnance can render land unusable for further use or make access across it dangerous or fatal.

==== Nuclear weapons/fallout ====
The detonation of nuclear weapons results in the spread of nuclear fallout, which causes ecological damage and in a hypothetical large-scale nuclear exchange, could cause a global mass extinction event.

=== Light pollution ===
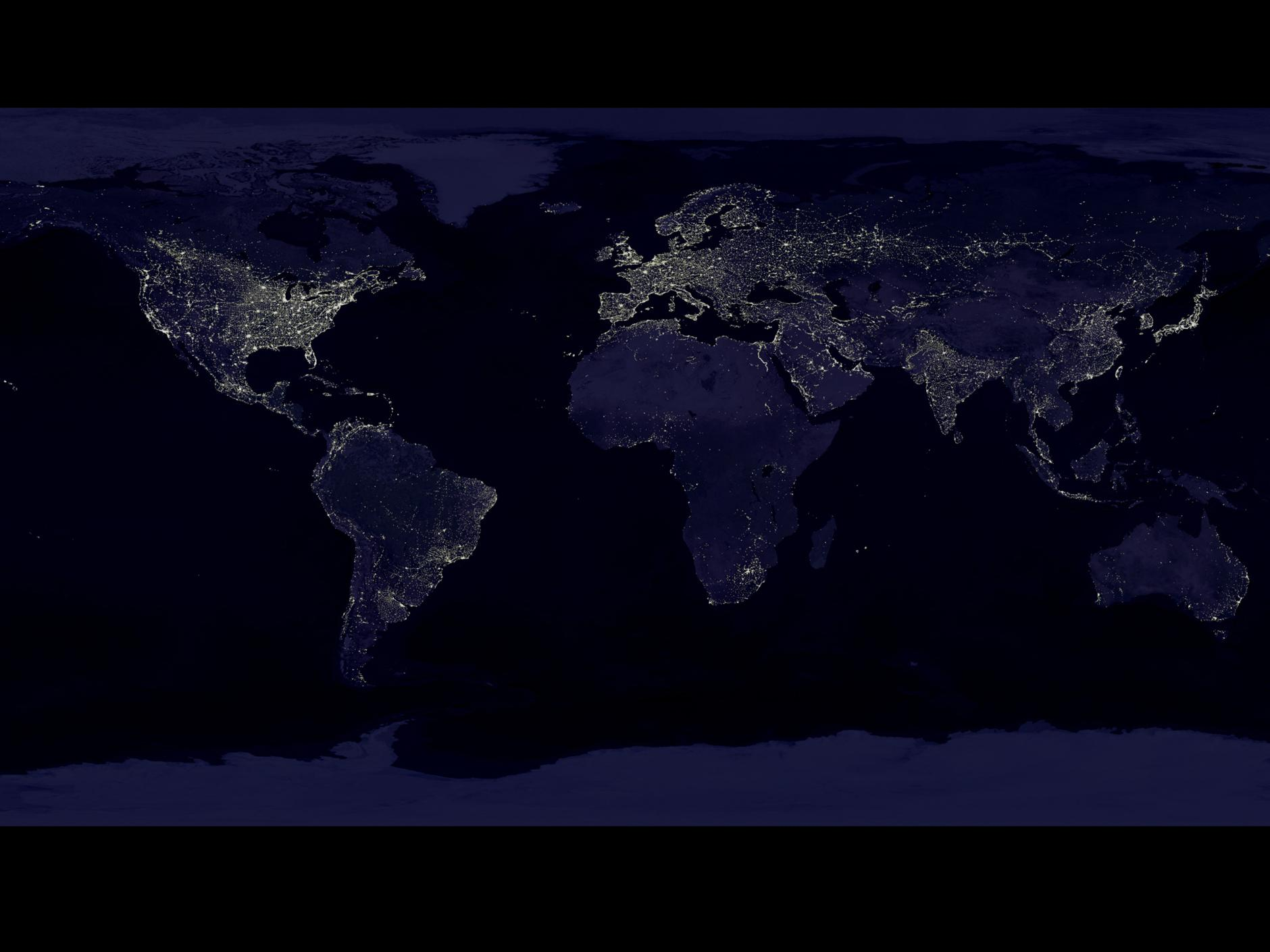
A composite image of artificial light emissions from Earth at night

Artificial light at night is one of the most obvious physical changes that humans have made to the biosphere, and is the easiest form of pollution to observe from space. The main environmental impacts of artificial light are due to light's use as an information source (rather than an energy source). The hunting efficiency of visual predators generally increases under artificial light, changing predator-prey interactions. Artificial light also affects dispersal, orientation, migration, and hormone levels, resulting in disrupted circadian rhythms.

=== Fashion ===
In terms of carbon dioxide emissions, the fast fashion industry contributes 4–5 billion tonnes per year, equating to 8–10% of total global emissions. Carbon dioxide is a greenhouse gas, meaning it causes heat to get trapped in the atmosphere, rather than being released into space, raising the Earth's temperature – known as global warming.

Alongside greenhouse gas emissions the industry is also responsible for almost 35% of microplastic pollution in the oceans. Scientists have estimated that there are approximately 12–125 trillion tonnes of microplastic particles in the Earth's oceans. These particles are ingested by marine organisms, including fish later eaten by humans. The study states that many of the fibres found are likely to have come from clothing and other textiles, either from washing, or degradation.

Textile waste is a huge issue for the environment, with around 2.1 billion tonnes of unsold or faulty clothing being disposed of per year. Much of this is taken to landfill, but the majority of materials used to make clothes are not biodegradable, resulting in them breaking down and contaminating soil and water.

Fashion, much like most other industries such as agriculture, requires a large volume of water for production. The rate and quantity at which clothing is produced in fast fashion means the industry uses 79 trillion litres of water every year. Water consumption has proven to be very detrimental to the environment and its ecosystems, leading to water depletion and scarcity, which affect marine life and humans. The fashion industry is responsible for roughly one-fifth of all industrial water pollution.

== Society and culture ==
=== Warnings by the scientific community ===
There are many publications from the scientific community to warn everyone about growing threats to sustainability, in particular threats to "environmental sustainability". The World Scientists' Warning to Humanity in 1992 begins with: "Human beings and the natural world are on a collision course". About 1,700 of the world's leading scientists, including most Nobel Prize laureates in the sciences, signed this warning letter. The letter mentions severe damage to the atmosphere, oceans, ecosystems, soil productivity, and more. It said that if humanity wants to prevent the damage, steps need to be taken: better use of resources, abandonment of fossil fuels, stabilization of human population, elimination of poverty and more.

More warning letters were signed in 2017 and 2019 by thousands of scientists from over 150 countries which called again to reduce overconsumption (including eating less meat), reducing fossil fuels use and other resources and so forth. Environmental storytelling may also constitute part of the environmental movement. Creative environmental vision can help eschew moral preaching in favor of self-reflection through ecological contradictions. Rather than pushing readers toward guilt or fear, this type of communication invites self-recognition and emotional engagement, which can be more effective in shifting environmental attitudes.

== See also ==
- Barriers to pro-environmental behaviour
- Effects of climate change on the water cycle
- Environmental impact of meat production
- Environmental impact of fishing
- Environmental impact of automobiles
- Environmental impact of concrete
- Environmental impact of hydraulic fracturing
- Environmental impact of iron ore mining
- Environmental impact of the coal industry
- Environmental issues
- Human overpopulation
- Overconsumption
- Planetary boundaries
- Sustainability
