= Wind erosion equation =

A wind erosion equation is an equation used to design wind erosion control systems, which considers soil erodibility, soil roughness, climate, the unsheltered distance across a field, and the vegetative cover on the ground.

$E = f(I, K, C, L, V)$

The Wind Erosion Equation (WEQ) is a mathematical model used to estimate the potential average annual soil loss (E) from a field due to wind erosion. This equation incorporates several key variables: the Soil Erodibility Index (I), which measures the susceptibility of soil to erosion; the Soil Ridge Roughness Factor (K), reflecting the surface roughness and its impact on wind flow; the Climatic Factor (C), representing the influence of wind speed and frequency on erosion; the Unsheltered Median Travel Distance (L), indicating the distance over which wind can travel unimpeded across a field; and the Equivalent Quantity of Vegetative Cover (V), accounting for the protective effect of vegetation in reducing soil erosion. Together, these variables enable a comprehensive assessment of the risk and severity of wind erosion in agricultural and environmental planning.

The study of wind erosion involves understanding the factors influencing the wind's capacity to mobilize soil. The potency of wind in causing soil movement is notably correlated with the cube of the wind's speed and its persistence. Research indicates that soil movement commences when wind speeds surpass a critical threshold and the rate of erosion aligns with the cube of the friction velocity. Friction velocity, denoted as $U_*$, is a meteorological term for wind speed at the Earth's surface and can be quantified using the equation:

$U_* = \frac{U}{5.75 \log \frac{z}{k}}$

In this equation, $U$ represents the wind velocity measured at height $z$, and $k$ is the von Kármán constant, roughly valued at 0.4. This relationship is indicative of the logarithmic wind profile, which describes the variation of wind speed with altitude, influenced by surface texture and atmospheric conditions.

Historically, acquiring precise wind data to study these phenomena has been challenging. Records of detailed wind velocities and directions are predominantly sourced from strategic locations such as airports or military bases. The scarcity of these records, often limited in both geographical scope and historical range—frequently dating back to the World War II era—poses significant limitations to the research. Methodological inconsistencies, such as the lack of standardized measurement heights, introduce variables that may affect the accuracy of correlating wind speed with height, which is critical for predicting erosion accurately. Additionally, local environmental factors like temperature gradients, structural barriers, and ground conditions can further obscure precise erosion forecasting.
