= Jean-Luc Bertrand-Krajewski =

Civil Engineering

- Education: ENGEES, Strasbourg (MSc, PhD)
- Awards: IWA Fellow; JCUD Career Achievement Award
- Scientific career
- Fields: Sewage; Urban Runoff
- Workplaces: INSA Lyon; DEEP Laboratory
- Thesis: (1992)
- Website: jlbkpro.free.fr/index.html

Jean-Luc Bertrand-Krajewski is a professor at INSA Lyon and Head of the DEEP Laboratory.

== Career ==
Bertrand-Krajewski got his PhD in 1992. His research has focussed on Urban Drainage processes, modelling and monitoring. In his capacity as researcher, Bertrand-Krajewski is also a member of the Société hydrotechnique de France (SHF) and was president of GRAIE, the organisation behind the Novatech conferences. On an international level, Bertrand-Krajewksi has been an elected member, chair and associate member of the Joint Committee Urban Drainage, a Fellow for the IWA, member of the Board of Directors of IWA Publishing and a member of the editorial board of the Urban Water Journal.

In 2021, Betrand-Krajewski published a book on Metrology of Urban Drainage System: Plug and Pray together with researchers from the TU Delft and other partners from the Urban Drainage community. According to Semantic Scholar, Betrand-Krajewski has published over 130 scientific articles with a h-index of 31 and 4118 citations, which is comparable to the figures given on ResearchGate. On his personal website, Betrand-Krajewksi lists 89 internationally peer-reviewed publications, 28 peer-reviewed papers in national journals (French), 16 additional publications in French and 248 contributions to national and international conferences
