= Wilhelm von der Emde =

German-Austrian civil engineer (1922–2020)

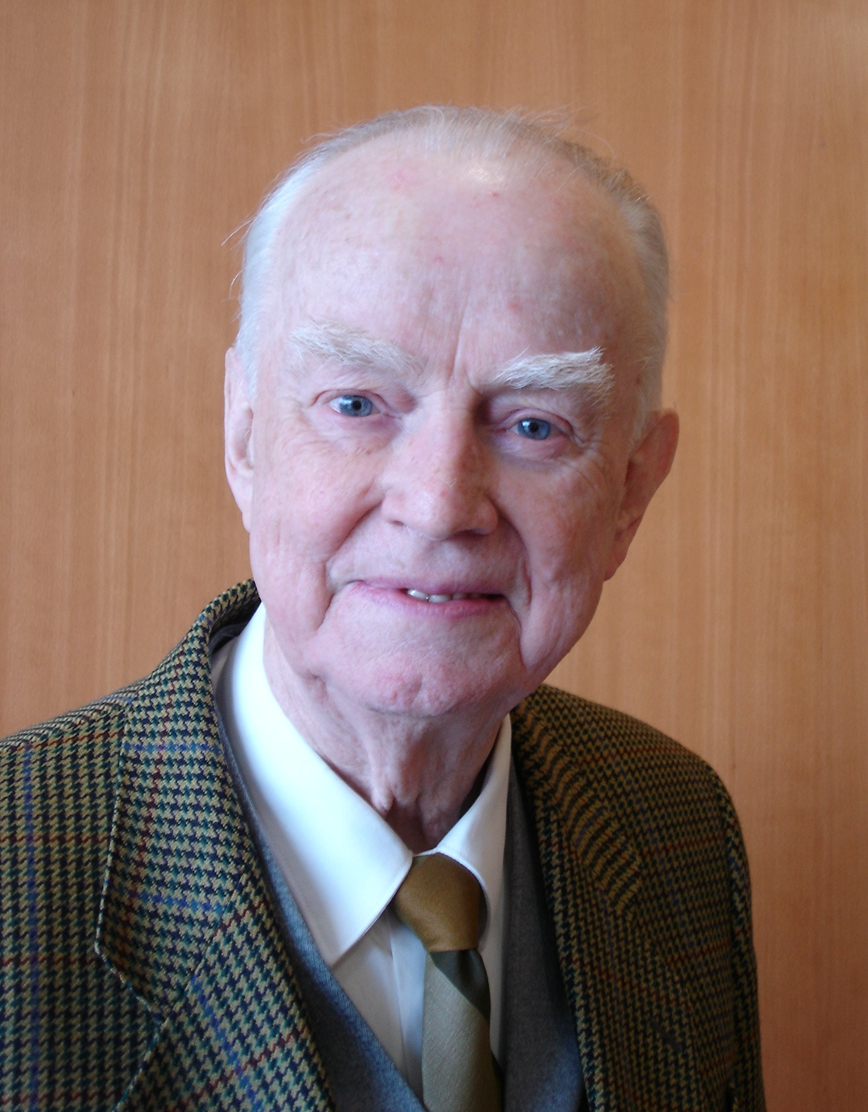
- von der Emde in 2017
- Born: 14 May 1922; Kassel, Germany
- Died: 19 February 2020 (aged 97); Baden bei Wien, Vienna
- Education: Technical University of Hanover
- Engineering career
- Institutions: Technische Universität Wien
- Significant advance: Wastewater treatment
- Awards: List

Wilhelm von der Emde (14 May 1922 – 19 February 2020) was a German-Austrian civil engineer. He played a major role in the development of the activated sludge process for biological wastewater treatment in sewage treatment plants and the establishment of an infrastructure for treatment and disposal of municipal and industrial wastewater. Further fields of his broad spectrum of activities included the training of operating personnel of wastewater treatment plants. He initiated the establishment of corresponding training networks and participated in their organisation in a leading position. His work provided the central basis for concepts of water protection and for maintaining and improving water quality.

== Life ==
Wilhelm von der Emde was born in Kassel, Germany, then Weimar Republic. Interrupted by military service, he studied civil engineering at the Technical University of Hanover (Technische Hochschule Hannover) from 1940 to 1948. From 1949 to the end of 1952 he worked in Dietrich Kehr's engineering office, and from 1953 to 1958 he was assistant and senior engineer at the Institute for Urban Water Management at the Technical University of Hannover (Director: Dietrich Kehr), where he received his doctorate on 10 July 1957.

In his dissertation, he described the state-of-the-art of the methodology for dimensioning wastewater treatment plants at that time and developed a new procedure to calculate the oxygen consumption and excess sludge production of aeration plants, which is still used today in a slightly modified form. In the following years (1958-1964) he worked as head of the department of wastewater treatment plants at Stadtentwässerung Hamburg. Overlapping (from 1960 to 1964) he was a lecturer at the Technical University of Braunschweig and from April 1961 onward he also lectured at the Technical University of Delft. During a stay in England (Manchester) he met William T. Lockett, one of the inventors of the activated sludge process. In 1914 Lockett, together with Edward Ardern, had invented the activated sludge process based on the work of Gilbert John Fowler.

In 1960, at the suggestion of the World Health Organisation (WHO) and the Organisation for Economic Cooperation and Development (OECD), with the participation of the Technical University of Delft and the Netherlands Universities Foundation for International Cooperation (Nuffic), the "European Course in Sanitary Engineering", today IHE Delft (UNESCO-IHE) was established. Wilhelm von der Emde was a full-time lecturer at this research and educational institution from 1962 until 1964 when he accepted a position at the TU Wien. There he founded the Institute for Water Supply, Wastewater Treatment and Water Pollution Control (today: Institute for Water Quality and Resource Management), which he headed from 1 October 1964 until his retirement on 1 October 1987.

Wilhelm von der Emde died on 19 February 2020 at the age of 97 in Baden bei Wien.

== Work and achievements ==
During his work at Hamburg's municipal wastewater treatment company Hamburger Stadtentwässerung, he was significantly involved in the planning of the Köhlbrandhöft wastewater treatment plant, the first large-scale plant with high-load biology.

In the late 1960s, Wilhelm von der Emde, together with Rolf Kayser (later holder of the chair for urban water management at TU Braunschweig), planned the Blumental wastewater treatment plant in Vienna, which went into operation in 1969. This plant attracted great international attention, as it was one of the first large-scale plants in the world to be able to remove not only organic contaminants but also nitrogen compounds to a large extent in the same tank by biological means. Also, essential parts of the functional concept of the later main wastewater treatment plant in Vienna (Hauptkläranlage Wien), which went into operation in 1980 and was extended in 2005, are based on the work of Wilhelm von der Emde.

Von der Emde recognised very early on, that the objectives of water protection can only be achieved if pollution by industrial wastewater is largely avoided. Under his leadership, the institute, therefore, dealt intensively with the treatment and disposal of wastewater from leather, pulp and sugar production as well as the chemical industry, which were responsible for a substantial part of the pollution of water bodies in Austria. In many cases, new wastewater treatment processes were developed from laboratory tests to the operation of large-scale plants. A typical example is a process developed in the 1980s for the purification of wastewater from citric acid production by the company Jungbunzlauer in Pernhofen (Lower Austria). The central part of the solution to this problem is the anaerobic pre-treatment of the concentrated wastewater, which takes place in an upflow sludge bed reactor with a rotary distributor (EKJ reactor). As a joint project together with his successor at TU Wien, Helmut Kroiss, this device was patented in 1983.

In the field of river basin management, Wilhelm von der Emde researched the relationship between wastewater treatment and water quality. In practice, the results led to improved water protection and a considerable increase in water quality, not only in Austria. For example, the "Danube Expert Report", the contents of which led to the "Danube Regulation", served as a tool to legally anchor biological wastewater treatment in Austria.

Equally important was the work of Wilhelm von der Emde and his team in reducing and preventing the eutrophication of water bodies. The main focus here was the avoidance of phosphorus inputs into Lake Constance and Lake Neusiedl. The measures initiated and implemented were extremely successful and are internationally regarded as a milestone in the field of water protection.

Wilhelm von der Emde was co-founder and board member of the International Water Association (IWA) and held leading positions in many bodies and committees of this organisation (e.g. Specialist Group on Design, Operation and Costs of Large Wastewater Treatment Plants). At TU Wien, the "Workshop on Design - Operation Interactions at Large Treatment Plants" was held and organized at his suggestion in September 1971. This was the first conference on this topic of the IWA (at that time: International Association on Water Pollution Research, IAWPR), which is active worldwide today. Wilhelm von der Emde was also active at the German Association for Water Management, Sewage and Waste (DWA - Deutsche Vereinigung für Wasserwirtschaft, Abwasser und Abfall, formerly ATV - Abwassertechnische Vereinigung). Among other positions, he headed the ATV technical committee 2.6 "Aerobic biological wastewater treatment processes" (later name: DWA technical committee KA-6 "Aerobic biological wastewater treatment processes"). This committee, with his significant participation, drew up the guideline ATV-A 131 (1991), in which the technical rules for the selection of the most appropriate methods for the elimination of carbon, nitrogen and phosphorus in wastewater treatment plants as well as for the design of the main plant components and equipment are compiled. Based on these rules and regulations, wastewater treatment plants with a population equivalent of 5,000 or more have been and are being designed, planned and built internationally.

In addition, Wilhelm von der Emde was committed to the training of qualified personnel for sewage treatment plants at a national and international level. Thus he was in a leading position in the development of today's training program of the Austrian Water and Waste Management Association (ÖWAV - Österreichischer Wasser- und Abfallwirtschaftsverband) for qualified personnel in the field of wastewater management.

== Honours, decorations, awards and distinctions ==
- 1956: Karl Imhoff Prize of ATV
- 1961: George Bradley Gascoigne Medal of Water Pollution Control Federation (WPCF), USA
- 1981: Österreichisches Ehrenkreuz für Wissenschaft und Kunst 1st Class
- 1987: William Dunbar Medal of the European Water Association (EWA)
- 1992: Prize of the City of Vienna for Natural Sciences
- 1992: Max Prüß Medal of DWA

== Selected published works ==
- Wilhelm v.d. Emde (1957): Beitrag zu Versuchen zur Abwasserreinigung mit belebtem Schlamm, published by the Institute for Urban Water Management of the Technical University of Hanover, Hannover, 1957
- Wilhelm v.d. Emde (1964): Die Technik der Belüftung in Belebtschlammanlagen (incl. discussion), Schweizerische Zeitschrift für Hydrologie, XXVI, 338–370
- Wilhelm v.d. Emde (1964): 50 Jahre Schlammbelebungsverfahren – Die Geschichte des Belebungsverfahrens (50 Years Activated Sludge Treatment – History of the Activated Sludge Process), gwf Wasser Abwasser, 105(28), 755–760
- Wilhelm v.d. Emde (1971): Abwasserteiche, Belebungsverfahren, Faulverfahren, 6. ÖWWV-Seminar „Industrieabwässer“, Raach, 29.3 – 2.4 1971, Wiener Mitteilungen 6, M1–43
- Wilhelm v.d. Emde (1999): Geschichte der Abwasserentsorgung (The history of wastewater collection and discharge), ATV Publishing, Hennef

== Bibliography ==
- Roland Berger, Friedrich Ehrendorfer (Hrsg.): Ökosystem Wien, Die Naturgeschichte einer Stadt, Böhlau-Verlag, 2011, ISBN 978-3-205-77420-4
- David Jenkins, Jiri Wanner (Hrsg.): Activated Sludge – 100 Years and Counting, IWA-Publishing, 2014, ISBN 978-1-78040-493-6.
- Korrespondenz Abwasser, Abfall: Personalien, Wilhelm von der Emde 95 Jahre, KA, 64 (2017), 5, S. 436
