= One Water =

One Water may refer to:

- One Water (water management), a water management approach
- One Water (documentary), a 2008 film about water management
