= Helmut Kroiss =

Austrian civil engineer (born 1944)

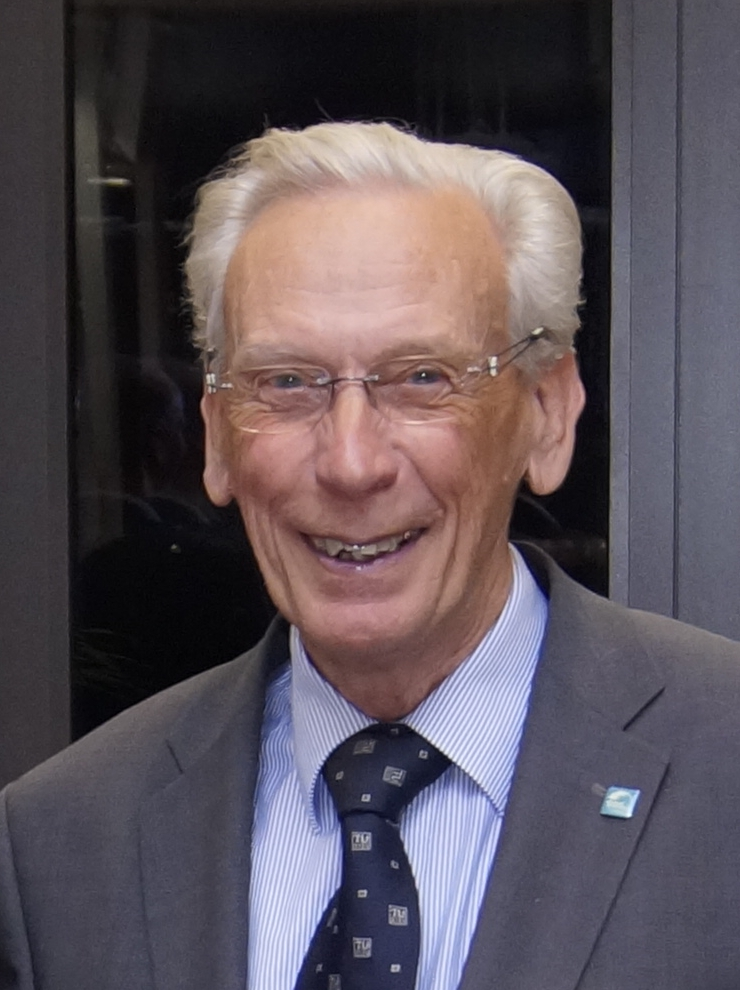
- Kroiss in 2018
- Born: 1944 (age 81–82); Mauterndorf, Salzburg
- Education: Technische Universität Wien (Dipl.-Ing)
- Engineering career
- Institutions: Technische Universität Wien
- Significant advance: Water conservation
- Awards: List

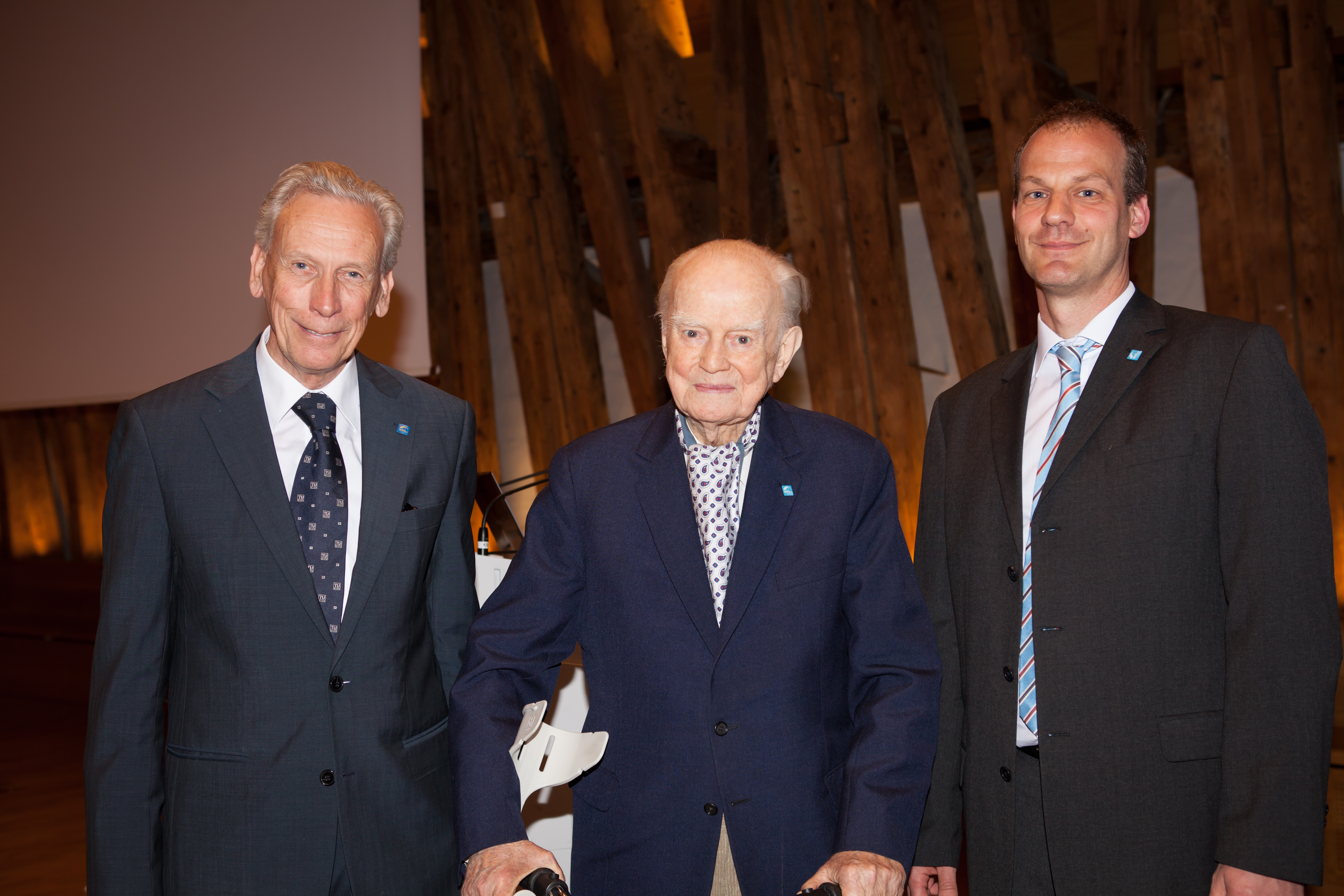
The three iwr-professors, 2014 (f.l.t.r.: Helmut Kroiss, Wilhelm von der Emde, Jörg Krampe)

Helmut Kroiss (born 1944) is an Austrian civil engineer and professor emeritus of the TU Wien, Vienna. In 1987 he was appointed to the Institute of Water Quality and Resource Management at the TU Wien, as successor to Wilhelm von der Emde, which he headed until his retirement in 2012.

== Life ==
Helmut Kroiss was born 1944 in Mauterndorf in the Salzburg province, district Lungau, Austria. He attended elementary school there from 1950 to 1954. He completed his secondary education at the Federal Boarding School Graz-Liebenau (today: HIB Graz Liebenau), where he graduated in 1962. From 1962 onward he studied civil engineering at TU Wien, majoring in hydraulic engineering. In 1971 he graduated with the degree of Dipl.-Ing. After completing his military service, he worked from 1972 to 1985 as assistant to Wilhelm von der Emde at the Institute for Water Quality and Landscape Water Engineering, (today's name: Institute for Water Quality and Resource Management - iwr) at TU Wien.

Helmut Kroiss completed his doctoral studies in 1977 with a dissertation on the subject of the purification of sugar factory wastewater, which was the result of a study initiated by the sugar industry. The aim was to develop a mechanical biological wastewater treatment process for the flume and wash water from beet sugar production which allows recirculation of the treated effluent without addition of chemicals. The research concentrated on the reliable control of bulking sludge using the selector principle. The process developed was successfully implemented at a large Austrian sugar factory and served as a model for implementation in other industries. In 1985 Helmut Kroiss published his habilitation treatise on Anaerobic Wastewater Treatment which led to teaching authorisation (venia legendi) in the field of wastewater treatment.

After having spent 2½ years at VOEST-ALPINE AG Linz as head of the research and development department for water and wastewater he returned to TU Wien in 1987 as successor to Wilhelm von der Emde. He headed the Institute's Department of Water Quality Management and, alternating with Paul Brunner, the entire Institute for Water Quality and Resource Management until his retirement in 2012.

== Work and achievements ==
At the beginning of his professional career, he was involved in research together with von der Emde within the framework of the International Commission for the Protection of Lake Constance (IGKB). His first international project was concerned with combined storm water overflow, which resulted in Report No. 14 of the IGKB, the contents of which in turn were integrated into the guideline ATV-A 128 (1977/1) of the DWA. This was followed by investigations for design and operation of the Vienna Main Wastewater Treatment Plant (3.5 Mio PE, start of operation 1980). Helmut Kroiss was operating 2 pilot plants in-line with the main wastewater flow for about two years. They resulted in the implementation of the selector concept for bulking control into the final design of this plant and also in reliable data on sludge production and composition for the design of sludge treatment and disposal. It was the first time a mass balance concept was applied for data quality control.

A main focus of his activities was the development of different treatment processes for wastewaters from large municipalities and different industrial branches. His work can be characterised as a successful combination of scientific research results and the development of reliable practical solutions. Methodological lab-scale investigations were performed in order to solve scientific problems and in most cases onsite and online pilot scale plants were operated in order to confirm engineering solutions under actual conditions. In this way the future operators of plants could be involved in solutions during the development and design phase.

A further focus of his work was on anaerobic wastewater treatment triggered by the energy crisis of the 1970s. The extensive lab and pilot investigations became the cornerstone of a patented process for the anaerobic treatment of industrial waste water, the EKJ process (Emde-Kroiss-Jungbunzlauer), which Kroiss developed together with his mentor Wilhelm von der Emde in cooperation with an Austrian company and which was used for the energy efficient treatment of concentrated industrial waste water. The largest of these plants, with a reactor volume of 30,000 m^{3}, was built for the citric acid factory in Pernhofen, Austria.

In addition, his scientific activities included a focus on energy use minimisation for treatment plants as well as energy recovery from wastewater and wastes e.g. making wastewater treatment plants like the Vienna Plant energy self-sufficient or to convert beet sugar production to energy self-sufficiency by replacing natural gas by biogas from online anaerobic treatment of the beet residues after sugar extraction. He also dealt intensively with the topic of nutrient emissions and river basin management. Under his leadership, the EU project daNUbs examined nutrient emissions into the Danube catchment area and their effects on the Black Sea. His work also created the basis for benchmarking at wastewater treatment plants. Furthermore, he dealt with issues ranging from sewage sludge utilisation and disposal to nutrition and sustainability as well as climate change in connection with water quality management.

Helmut Kroiss managed national and international projects in the fields of industrial and municipal wastewater treatment, plant design and operation and, in later years, increasingly in the field of river basin management, in Austria, Germany, Singapore, Indonesia, India, China, Hong Kong, Finland, Croatia, Slovenia and Hungary. Continuing the work of his predecessor, he was also involved in the training of wastewater treatment specialists in cooperation with the Austrian Water and Waste Management Association (ÖWAV - Österreichischer Wasser- und Abfallwirtschaftsverband. In this context, he organised and conducted specialist courses and also helped to set up corresponding training programmes, e.g. in Bulgaria and Macedonia, in the years after the "opening to the East". Helmut Kroiss was elected as Vice-president and later President of the Austrian Water and Waste Association (ÖWAV). Even after his retirement, Helmut Kroiss continued to be active with national professional committees, such as ÖWAV, as well as in international associations like the German Association for Water, Wastewater and Waste (DWA - Deutsche Vereinigung für Wasserwirtschaft, Abwasser und Abfall, and the IWA (International Water Association).

He also put his expertise at the service of international, relevant non-university organisations and scientific committees. In 2001 Helmut Kroiss became a full member of the European Academy of Sciences and Arts and he is a long-standing member of the technical and scientific committee of the European Water Association (EWA). From 2004 Helmut Kroiss worked as a consultant of the Syndicat interdépartemental pour l’assainissement de l’agglomération parisienne (in German) (SIAAP), responsible for wastewater treatment and disposal of the Greater Paris Area.

The international recognition of Helmut Kroiss was strongly supported by his long-term membership of international water associations, starting in 1974. Already in the 1980s he became member of the Board of Directors of the International Association on Water Quality (IAWQ) a precursor of the International Water Association (IWA). During his chairmanship of the IWA Specialist Group on Design, Operation and Economics of Large Wastewater Treatment Plants, initiated by his predecessor Wilhelm von der Emde in 1971, he was responsible for the organisation of two IWA Specialist Conferences in Vienna in 1995 and 2007. From 2004 to 2008 he was a member of the IWA Board of Directors as chair of the Program Committee, responsible for the scientific program of the IWA World Water Congresses in Beijing (2006) and Vienna (2008). From 2004 to 2014 he was a member of the IWA publishing committee and Editor-in-Chief of Water Science and Technology, Water Science and Technology : Water Supply and Water Practice and Technology at IWAP, the publishing company of IWA. He rejoined the IWA Board of Directors from 2012 to 2018 and in 2013 was elected IWA president for the term 2014 to 2016 starting his role at the Lisbon IWA World Water Congress in autumn 2014. His engagement with the IWA board ended in 2018 in Tokyo in South-East Asia where his international activity had focussed for about 20 years.

Beyond his role as professor at the institute, he held various positions at the Faculty of Civil Engineering and in the Senate of the TU Wien. From 1988 to September 2010 he was a member of the Senate of the TU Wien. He was Vice-Dean of the Faculty of Civil Engineering in the academic years 1992/93 and 1993/94, as well as Dean of the Faculty in the academic years 1994/95 to 1997/98. He held the position of Deputy Chairman of the Senate from October 2003 until September 2010.

At the end of the 1990s, he was instrumental in establishing the double degree bachelor and master course in hydraulic engineering in German language at the University of Architecture, Civil Engineering and Geodesy (UACG) in Sofia/Bulgaria and TU Wien. In 2003 he was awarded an honorary doctorate at UACG and in 2013 was visiting professor at the Universiti Teknologi Malaysia.

== Honours, decorations, awards and distinctions ==
=== National ===
- 2002: Österreichisches Ehrenkreuz für Wissenschaft und Kunst, 1st class
- 2006: Honorary President of the Austrian Water and Waste Management Association
- 2010: Golden Needle of Honour of the Austrian Water and Waste Management Association
- 2020: Johann Joseph Ritter von Prechtl-Medaille of the TU Wien

=== International ===
- 2000: Honorary member of the Bulgarian Water Association (BWA)
- 2002: Votocek Medal of the University of Chemistry and Technology, Prague
- 2003: Honorary doctorate of the University of Architecture, Civil Engineering and Geodesy, Sofia
- 2004: Honorary Membership at ATV/DVWK
- 2005: William Dunbar Medal of the European Water Association (EWA)
- 2008: Appointment as member of the Council of Distinguished Water Professionals of the International Water Association (IWA)
- 2015: Honorary membership of Water Environment Federation (WEF), USA

== Selected published works ==
- H. Kroiss: Anaerobe Abwasserreinigung. In: Wilhelm v. d. Emde (Hrsg.): Wiener Mitteilungen. Band 73, TU Wien, 1988.
- B. Raschauer, E. Morscher, H. Schröfelbauer, H. Kroiss: Lebenselement Wasser – Rechtliche, ökonomische und ökologische Aspekte der Nutzung. Facultas, 2003, ISBN 3-85076-617-9.
- C. Schmelz, H. Haider, H. Kroiss, W. Schönbäck, W. Becker, E. Matzner: Ökologie – Mensch – Ökonomie; Marktwirtschaft und Gemeinwohl in der Wasser- und Energiewirtschaft. Facultas, 2004, ISBN 3-85076-660-8.
- K. Rosenwinkel, H. Kroiss, N. Dichtl, C. Seyfried, P. Weiland (Hrsg.): Anaerobtechnik: Abwasser-, Schlamm- und Reststoffbehandlung. Springer, 2015, ISBN 978-3-642-24894-8.

== Bibliography ==
- Roland Berger, Friedrich Ehrendorfer (Hrsg.): Ökosystem Wien, Die Naturgeschichte einer Stadt. Böhlau-Verlag, 2011, ISBN 978-3-205-77420-4.
- David Jenkins, Jiri Wanner (Hrsg.): Activated Sludge – 100 Years and Counting. IWA-Publishing, 2014, ISBN 978-1-78040-493-6,
- Personalien, Helmut Kroiss 65 Jahre. In: Korrespondenz Wasserwirtschaft. Band 2, Nr. 8, 2009, S. 448–449.
