= EKJ =

EKJ may refer to:

- EKJ Consulting, co-designer of the Copenhagen–Ringsted Line
- Emde-Kroiss-Jungbunzlauer (EKJ) process and reactor, process for anaerobic wastewater treatment by Helmut Kroiss
