= Reclaimed water =

Converting wastewater into water that can be reused for other purposes

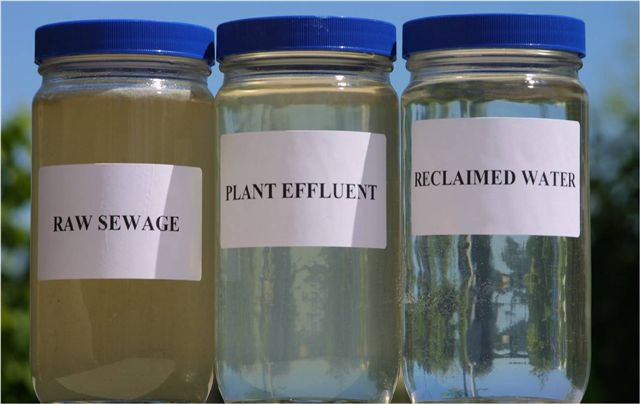
Sequence of reclamation from left: raw sewage, sewage treatment plant effluent, and finally reclaimed water (after several treatment steps)

Water reclamation is the process of converting municipal wastewater or sewage and industrial wastewater into water that can be reused for a variety of purposes. It is also called wastewater reuse, water reuse or water recycling. There are many types of reuse. It is possible to reuse water in this way in cities or for irrigation in agriculture. Other types of reuse are environmental reuse, industrial reuse, and reuse for drinking water, whether planned or not. Reuse may include irrigation of gardens and agricultural fields or replenishing surface water and groundwater. This latter is also known as groundwater recharge. Reused water also serve various needs in residences such as toilet flushing, businesses, and industry. It is possible to treat wastewater to reach drinking water standards. Injecting reclaimed water into the water supply distribution system is known as direct potable reuse. Drinking reclaimed water is not typical. Reusing treated municipal wastewater for irrigation is a long-established practice. This is especially so in arid countries. Reusing wastewater as part of sustainable water management allows water to remain an alternative water source for human activities. This can reduce scarcity. It also eases pressures on groundwater and other natural water bodies.

There are several technologies used to treat wastewater for reuse. A combination of these technologies can meet strict treatment standards and make sure that the processed water is hygienically safe, meaning free from pathogens. The following are some of the typical technologies: Ozonation, ultrafiltration, aerobic treatment (membrane bioreactor), forward osmosis, reverse osmosis, and advanced oxidation, or activated carbon. Some water-demanding activities do not require high grade water. In this case, wastewater can be reused with little or no treatment.

The cost of reclaimed water exceeds that of potable water in many regions of the world, where fresh water is plentiful. The costs of water reclamation options might be compared to the costs of alternative options which also achieve similar effects of freshwater savings, namely greywater reuse systems, rainwater harvesting and stormwater recovery, or seawater desalination.

Water recycling and reuse is of increasing importance, not only in arid regions but also in cities and contaminated environments. Municipal wastewater reuse is particularly high in the Middle East and North Africa region, in countries such as the UAE, Qatar, Kuwait and Israel.

== Definition ==
The term "water reuse" is generally used interchangeably with terms such as wastewater reuse, water reclamation, and water recycling. A definition by the USEPA states: "Water reuse is the method of recycling treated wastewater for beneficial purposes, such as agricultural and landscape irrigation, industrial processes, toilet flushing, and groundwater replenishing (EPA, 2004)." A similar description is: "Water Reuse, the use of reclaimed water from treated wastewater, has been a long-established reality in many (semi)arid countries and regions. It helps to alleviate water scarcity by supplementing limited freshwater resources."

The water that is used as an input to the treatment and reuse processes can be from a variety of sources. Usually it is wastewater (domestic or municipal, industrial or agricultural wastewater) but it could also come from urban runoff.

== Overview ==
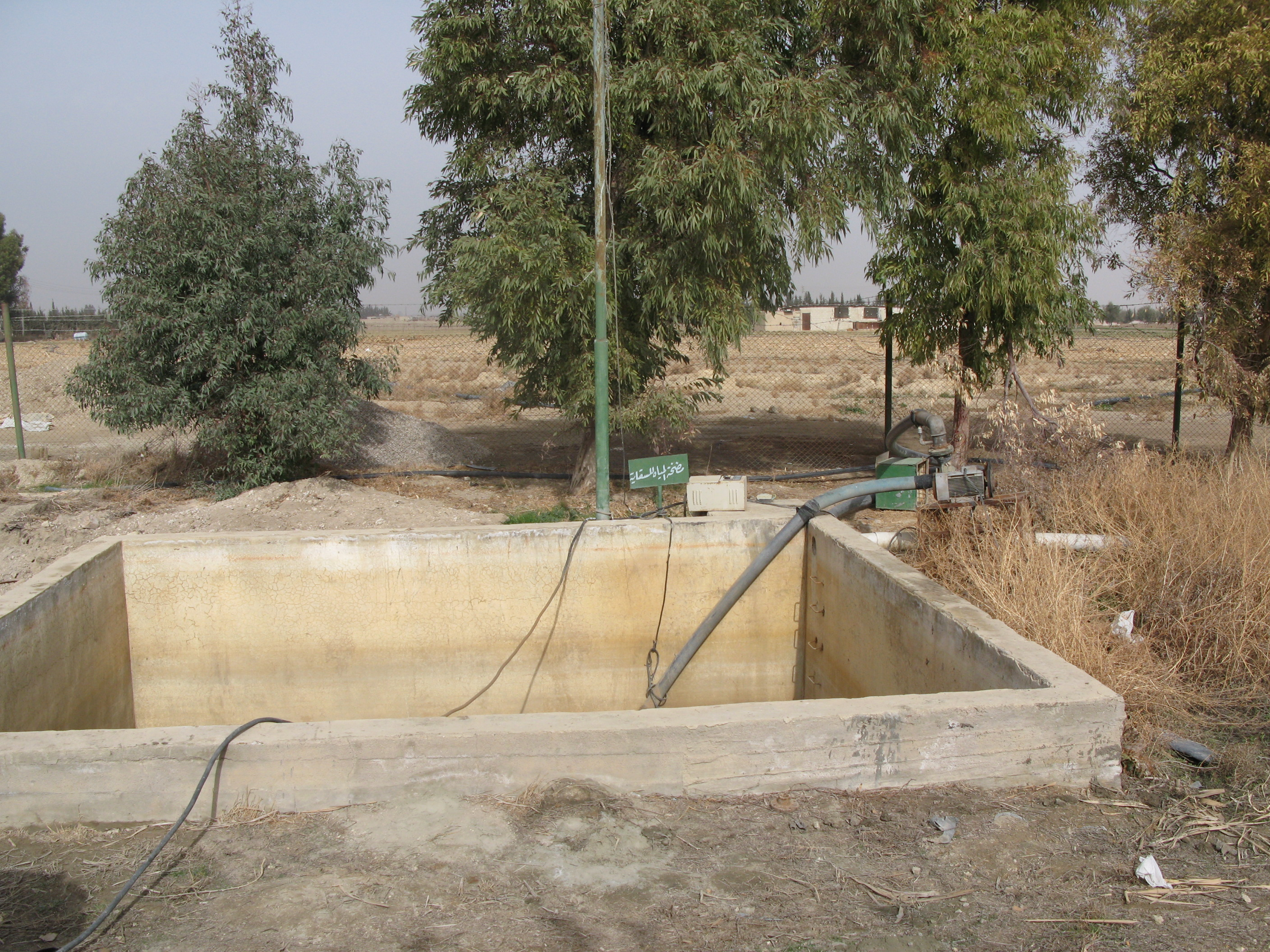
Irrigation water is pumped from this tank which stores effluent received from a constructed wetland in Haran-Al-Awamied, Syria.

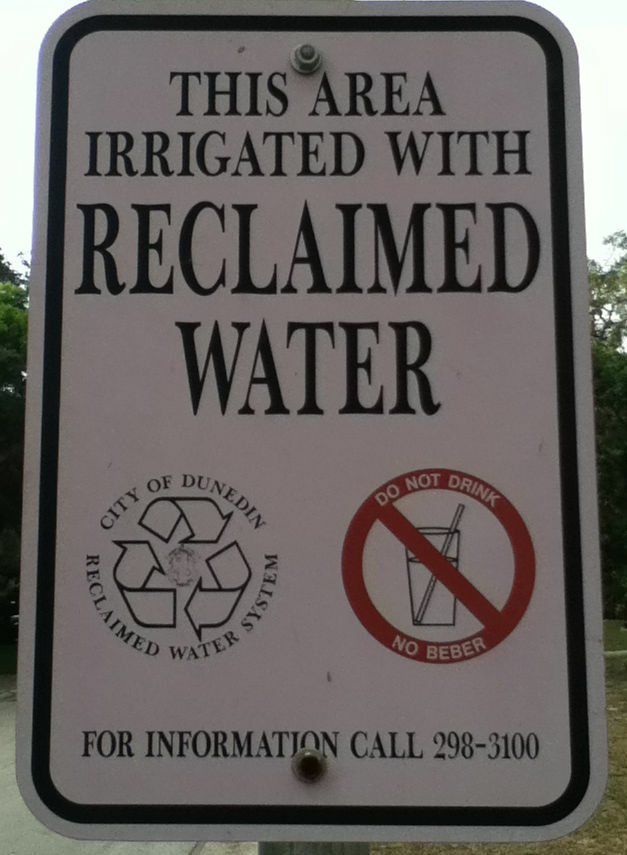
Reclaimed water sign in Dunedin, Florida, United States

Reclaimed water is water that is used more than one time before it passes back into the natural water cycle. Advances in municipal wastewater treatment technology allow communities to reuse water for many different purposes. The water is treated differently depending upon the source and use of the water as well as how it gets delivered.

=== Driving forces ===
The World Health Organization has recognized the following principal driving forces for municipal wastewater reuse:

1. increasing water scarcity and stress,
2. increasing populations and related food security issues,
3. increasing environmental pollution from improper wastewater disposal, and
4. increasing recognition of the resource value of wastewater, excreta and greywater.

In some areas, one driving force is also the implementation of advanced wastewater treatment for the removal of organic micropollutants, which leads to an overall improved water quality.

Water recycling and reuse is of increasing importance, not only in arid regions but also in cities and contaminated environments.

Already, the groundwater aquifers that are used by over half of the world population are being over-drafted. Reuse will continue to increase as the world's population becomes increasingly urbanized and concentrated near coastlines, where local freshwater supplies are limited or are available only with large capital expenditure. Large quantities of freshwater can be saved by municipal wastewater reuse and recycling, reducing environmental pollution and improving carbon footprint. Reuse can be an alternative water supply option.

Achieving more sustainable sanitation and wastewater management will require emphasis on actions linked to resource management, such as wastewater reuse or excreta reuse that will keep valuable resources available for productive uses. This in turn supports human wellbeing and broader sustainability.

=== Potential benefits ===
Water/wastewater reuse, as an alternative water source, can provide significant economic, social and environmental benefits, which are key motivators for implementing such reuse programs. These benefits include:

- For cities and households: Increased water availability (drinking water substitution – keep drinking water for drinking and reclaimed water for non-drinking use such as industry, cleaning, irrigation, domestic uses, and toilet flushing).
- For the environment: Reduced nutrient loads to receiving waters (i.e. rivers, canals and other surface water resources); reduced over-abstraction of surface and groundwater; enhanced environmental protection by restoration of streams, wetlands and ponds; reduced energy consumption associated with production, treatment, and distribution of water (1.2 to 2.1 kWh/m^{3}) compared to using deep groundwater resources, water importation or desalination
- Reduced manufacturing costs of using high quality reclaimed water
- In agriculture: Irrigation with treated wastewater may contribute to improve production yields, reduce the ecological footprint and promote socioeconomic benefits. It may also lead to reduced application of fertilizers (i.e. conservation of nutrients and reducing the need for artificial fertilizer through soil nutrition by the nutrients existing in the treated effluents).

Reclaiming water for reuse applications instead of using freshwater supplies can be a water-saving measure. When used water is eventually discharged back into natural water sources, it can still have benefits to ecosystems, improving streamflow, nourishing plant life and recharging aquifers, as part of the natural water cycle.

=== Scale ===
Global treated wastewater reuse is estimated at 40.7 billion m^{3} per year, representing approximately 11% of the total domestic and manufacturing wastewater produced. Municipal wastewater reuse is particularly high in the Middle East and North Africa region, in countries such as the UAE, Qatar, Kuwait and Israel.

For the Sustainable Development Goal 6 by the United Nations, Target 6.3 states "Halving the proportion of untreated wastewater and substantially increasing recycling and safe reuse globally by 2030".

== Types and applications ==
Treated wastewater can be reused in industry (for example in cooling towers), in artificial recharge of aquifers, in agriculture, and in the rehabilitation of natural ecosystems (for example in wetlands). The main reclaimed water applications in the world are shown below:

Categories of use	Uses
Urban uses	Irrigation of public parks, sporting facilities, private gardens, roadsides; Street cleaning; Fire protection systems; Vehicle washing; Toilet flushing; Air conditioners; Dust control.
Agricultural uses	Food crops not commercially processed; Food crops commercially processed; Pasture for milking animals; Fodder; Fibre; Seed crops; Ornamental flowers; Orchards; Hydroponic culture; Aquaculture; Greenhouses; Viticulture.
Industrial uses	Processing water; Cooling water; Recirculating cooling towers; Washdown water; Washing aggregate; Making concrete; Soil compaction; Dust control.
Recreational uses	Golf course irrigation; Recreational impoundments with/without public access (e.g. fishing, boating, bathing); Aesthetic impoundments without public access; Snowmaking.
Environmental uses	Aquifer recharge; Wetlands; Marshes; Stream augmentation; Wildlife habitat; Silviculture.
Potable uses	Aquifer recharge for drinking water use; Augmentation of surface drinking water supplies; Treatment until drinking water quality.

=== Urban reuse ===
In rarer cases reclaimed water is also used to augment drinking water supplies. Most of the uses of water reclamation are non-potable uses such as washing cars, flushing toilets, cooling water for power plants, concrete mixing, artificial lakes, irrigation for golf courses and public parks, and for hydraulic fracturing. Where applicable, systems run a dual piping system to keep the recycled water separate from the potable water.

Usage types are distinguished as follows:

- Unrestricted: The use of reclaimed water for non-potable applications in municipal settings, where public access is not restricted.
- Restricted: The use of reclaimed water for non-potable applications in municipal settings, where public access is controlled or restricted by physical or institutional barriers, such as fencing, advisory signage, or temporal access restriction.

=== Agricultural reuse ===
Irrigation with recycled municipal wastewater can also serve to fertilize plants if it contains nutrients, such as nitrogen, phosphorus and potassium. There are benefits of using recycled water for irrigation, including the lower cost compared to some other sources and consistency of supply regardless of season, climatic conditions and associated water restrictions. When reclaimed water is used for irrigation in agriculture, the nutrient (nitrogen and phosphorus) content of the treated wastewater has the benefit of acting as a fertilizer. This can make the reuse of excreta contained in sewage attractive.

The irrigation water can be used in different ways on different crops, such as for food crops to be eaten raw or for crops which are intended for human consumption to be eaten raw or unprocessed. For processed food crops: crops which are intended for human consumption not to be eaten raw but after food processing (i.e. cooked, industrially processed). It can also be used on crops which are not intended for human consumption (e.g. pastures, forage, fiber, ornamental, seed, forest and turf crops).

==== Risks in agricultural reuse ====
In developing countries, agriculture is increasingly using untreated municipal wastewater for irrigation – often in an unsafe manner. Cities provide lucrative markets for fresh produce, so they are attractive to farmers. However, because agriculture has to compete for increasingly scarce water resources with industry and municipal users, there is often no alternative for farmers but to use water polluted with urban waste directly to water their crops.

There can be significant health hazards related to using untreated wastewater in agriculture. Municipal wastewater can contain a mixture of chemical and biological pollutants. In low-income countries, there are often high levels of pathogens from excreta. In emerging nations, where industrial development is outpacing environmental regulation, there are increasing risks from inorganic and organic chemicals. The World Health Organization developed guidelines for safe use of wastewater in 2006, advocating a 'multiple-barrier' approach wastewater use, for example by encouraging farmers to adopt various risk-reducing behaviors. These include ceasing irrigation a few days before harvesting to allow pathogens to die off in the sunlight; applying water carefully so it does not contaminate leaves likely to be eaten raw; cleaning vegetables with disinfectant; or allowing fecal sludge used in farming to dry before being used as a human manure.

Drawbacks or risks often mentioned include the content of potentially harmful substances such as bacteria, heavy metals, or organic pollutants (including pharmaceuticals, personal care products and pesticides). Irrigation with wastewater can have both positive and negative effects on soil and plants, depending on the composition of the wastewater and on the soil or plant characteristics.

=== Environmental reuse ===
The use of reclaimed water to create, enhance, sustain, or augment water bodies including wetlands, aquatic habitats, or stream flow is called "environmental reuse". For example, constructed wetlands fed by wastewater provide both wastewater treatment and habitats for flora and fauna.

=== Industrial reuse ===
Treated wastewater can be reused in industry (for example in cooling towers).

=== Planned potable reuse ===
Planned potable reuse is publicly acknowledged as an intentional project to recycle water for drinking water. There are two ways in which potable water can be delivered for reuse – "Indirect Potable Reuse" (IPR) and "Direct Potable Reuse". Both these forms of reuse are described below, and commonly involve a more formal public process and public consultation program than is the case with de facto or unacknowledged reuse.

Some water agencies reuse highly treated effluent from municipal wastewater or resource recovery plants as a reliable, drought-proof source of drinking water. By using advanced purification processes, they produce water that meets all applicable drinking water standards. System reliability and frequent monitoring and testing are imperative to their meeting stringent controls.

The water needs of a community, water sources, public health regulations, costs, and the types of water infrastructure in place— such as distribution systems, man-made reservoirs, or natural groundwater basins— determine if and how reclaimed water can be part of the drinking water supply. Some communities reuse water to replenish groundwater basins. Others put it into surface water reservoirs. In these instances the reclaimed water is blended with other water supplies and/or sits in storage for a certain amount of time before it is drawn out and gets treated again at a water treatment or distribution system. In some communities, the reused water is put directly into pipelines that go to a water treatment plant or distribution system.

Modern technologies such as reverse osmosis and ultraviolet disinfection are commonly used when reclaimed water will be mixed with the drinking water supply.

Many people associate a feeling of disgust with reclaimed water and 13% of a survey group said they would not even sip it. Nonetheless, the main health risk for potable use of reclaimed water is the potential for pharmaceutical and other household chemicals or their derivatives (environmental persistent pharmaceutical pollutants) to persist in this water. This would be less of a concern if human excreta was kept out of sewage by using dry toilets or, alternatively, systems that treat blackwater separately from greywater.

==== Indirect potable reuse ====
Indirect potable reuse (IPR) means the water is delivered to the consumer indirectly. After it is purified, the reused water blends with other supplies and/or sits a while in some sort of storage, man-made or natural, before it gets delivered to a pipeline that leads to a water treatment plant or distribution system. That storage could be a groundwater basin or a surface water reservoir.

Some municipalities are using and others are investigating IPR of reclaimed water. For example, reclaimed water may be pumped into (subsurface recharge) or percolated down to (surface recharge) groundwater aquifers, pumped out, treated again, and finally used as drinking water. This technique may also be referred to as groundwater recharging. This includes slow processes of further multiple purification steps via the layers of earth/sand (absorption) and microflora in the soil (biodegradation).

IPR or even unplanned potable use of reclaimed wastewater is used in many countries, where the latter is discharged into groundwater to hold back saline intrusion in coastal aquifers. IPR has generally included some type of environmental buffer, but conditions in certain areas have created an urgent need for more direct alternatives.

IPR occurs through the augmentation of drinking water supplies with municipal wastewater treated to a level suitable for IPR followed by an environmental buffer (e.g. rivers, dams, aquifers, etc.) that precedes drinking water treatment. In this case, municipal wastewater passes through a series of treatment steps that encompasses membrane filtration and separation processes (e.g. MF, UF and RO), followed by an advanced chemical oxidation process (e.g. UV, UV+H_{2}O_{2}, ozone). In 'indirect' potable reuse applications, the reclaimed wastewater is used directly or mixed with other sources.

==== Direct potable reuse ====
Direct potable reuse (DPR) means the reused water is put directly into pipelines that go to a water treatment plant or distribution system. Direct potable reuse may occur with or without "engineered storage" such as underground or above ground tanks. In other words, DPR is the introduction of reclaimed water derived from domestic wastewater after extensive treatment and monitoring to assure that strict water quality requirements are met at all times, directly into a municipal water supply system.

=== Reuse in space stations ===
Wastewater reclamation can be especially important in relation to human spaceflight. In 1998, NASA announced it had built a human waste reclamation bioreactor designed for use in the International Space Station and a crewed Mars mission. Human urine and feces are input into one end of the reactor and pure oxygen, pure water, and compost (humanure) are output from the other end. The soil could be used for growing vegetables, and the bioreactor also produces electricity.

Aboard the International Space Station, astronauts have been able to drink recycled urine due to the introduction of the ECLSS system. The system costs $250 million and has been working since May 2009. The system recycles wastewater and urine back into potable water used for drinking, food preparation, and oxygen generation. This cuts back on the need to frequently resupply the space station.

=== De facto wastewater reuse (unplanned potable reuse) ===
De facto, unacknowledged or unplanned potable reuse refers to situations where reuse of treated wastewater is practiced but is not officially recognized. For example, a sewage treatment plant from one city may be discharging effluents to a river which is used as a drinking water supply for another city downstream.

Unplanned Indirect Potable Use has existed for a long time. Large towns on the River Thames upstream of London (Oxford, Reading, Swindon, Bracknell) discharge their treated sewage ("non-potable water") into the Thames, which supplies water to London downstream. In the United States, the Mississippi River serves as both the destination of sewage treatment plant effluent and the source of potable water.

== Design considerations ==
=== Distribution ===
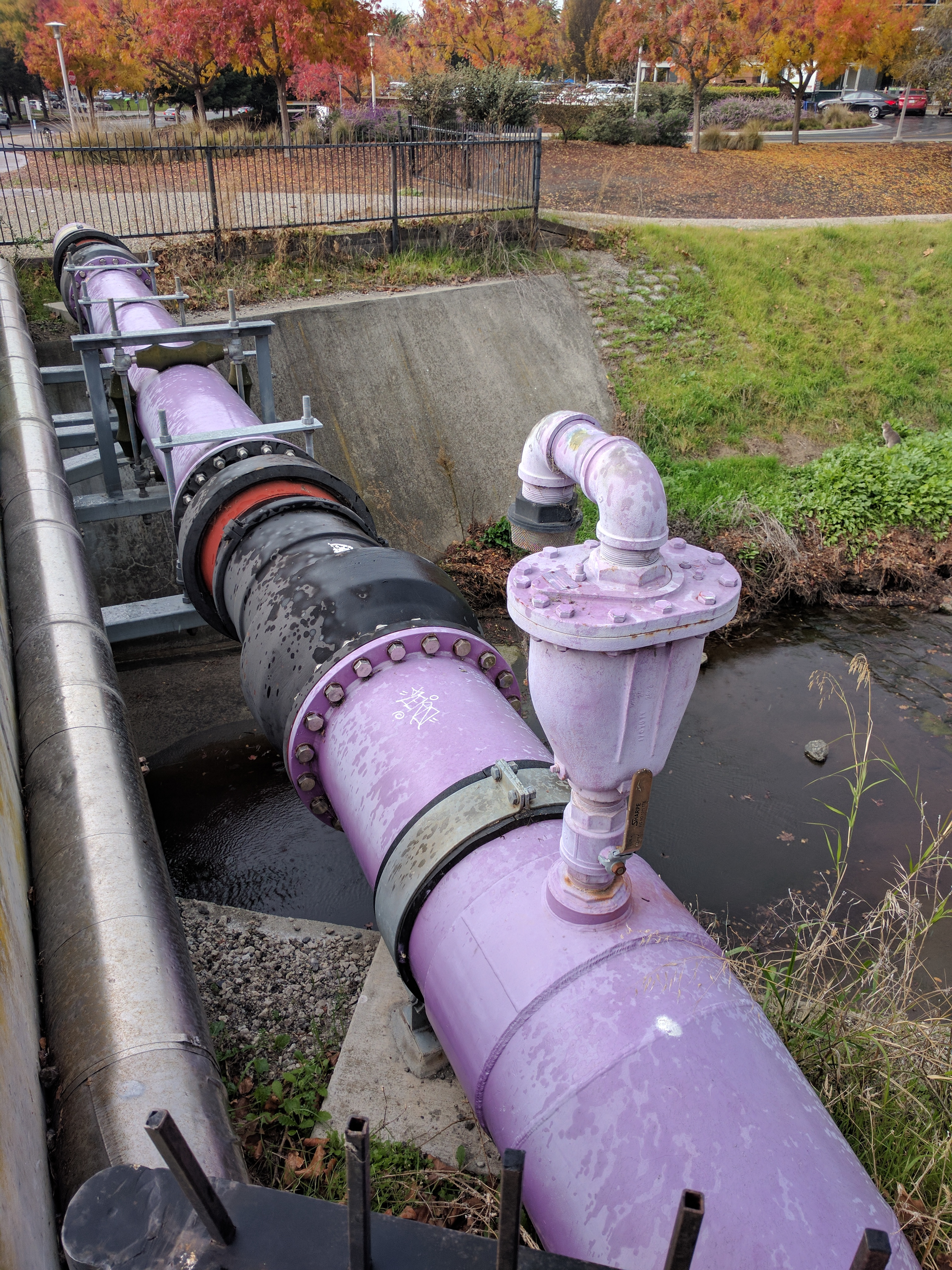
A lavender-colored pipeline carrying non-potable water in a dual piping system in Mountain View, California, U.S.

Non-potable reclaimed water is often distributed with a dual piping network that keeps reclaimed water pipes completely separate from potable water pipes.

=== Treatment processes ===
There are several technologies used to treat wastewater for reuse. A combination of these technologies can meet strict treatment standards and make sure that the processed water is hygienically safe, meaning free from pathogens. Some common technologies include ozonation, ultrafiltration, aerobic treatment (membrane bioreactor), forward osmosis, reverse osmosis, advanced oxidation or activated carbon. Reclaimed water providers use multi-barrier treatment processes and constant monitoring to ensure that reclaimed water is safe and treated properly for the intended end use.

Some water-demanding activities do not require high grade water. In this case, wastewater can be reused with little or no treatment. One example of this scenario is in the domestic environment where toilets can be flushed using greywater from baths and showers with little or no treatment.

In the case of municipal wastewater, the wastewater must pass through numerous sewage treatment process steps before it can be used. Steps might include screening, primary settling, biological treatment, tertiary treatment (for example reverse osmosis), and disinfection.

Wastewater is generally treated to only secondary level treatment when used for irrigation.

A pump station distributes reclaimed water to users around a city. These may include golf courses, agricultural uses, cooling towers, or landfills.

=== Alternative options ===
Rather than treating municipal wastewater for reuse purposes, other options can achieve similar effects of freshwater savings:

- Greywater reuse systems – at a household level, treated or untreated greywater may be used for flush toilets or to water a garden.
- Rainwater harvesting and stormwater recovery – Urban design systems which incorporate rainwater harvesting and reduce runoff are known as water-sensitive urban design (WSUD) in Australia, low-impact development (LID) in the United States and sustainable urban drainage systems (SUDS) in the United Kingdom.
- Seawater desalination – an energy-intensive process where salt and other minerals are removed from seawater to produce potable water for drinking and irrigation, typically through membrane filtration (reverse osmosis) or steam distillation.

=== Costs ===
The cost of reclaimed water exceeds that of potable water in many regions of the world, where fresh water is plentiful. However, reclaimed water is usually sold to citizens at a cheaper rate to encourage its use. As fresh water supplies become limited from distribution costs, increased population demands, or climate change, the cost ratios will evolve also. The evaluation of reclaimed water needs to consider the entire water supply system, as it may bring important flexibility into the overall system.

Reclaimed water systems usually require a dual piping network, often with additional storage tanks, which adds to the costs of the system.

=== Barriers to implementation ===
Barriers to water reclamation may include:

- Full-scale implementation and operation of water reuse schemes still face regulatory, economic, social and institutional challenges.
- Low economic viability of water reuse schemes. This may partly be due to costs of water quality monitoring and identification of contaminants. Difficulties in contaminant identification may include the separation of inorganic and organic pollutants, microorganisms, colloids, and others. Full cost recovery from water reuse schemes is difficult. There is a lack of financial water pricing systems comparable to already subsidized conventional treatment plants.
- Psychological barriers, sometimes referred to as the "yuck factor", can also be an impediment to implementation, particularly for direct potable reuse plans. These psychological factors are closely associated with disgust, specifically pathogen avoidance.

== Health aspects ==
Reclaimed water is considered safe when appropriately used. Reclaimed water planned for use in recharging aquifers or augmenting surface water receives adequate and reliable treatment before mixing with naturally occurring water and undergoing natural restoration processes. Some of this water eventually becomes part of drinking water supplies.

A study published in 2009 compared the differences in water quality between reclaimed/recycled water, surface water, and groundwater. Results indicated that reclaimed water, surface water, and groundwater are more similar than dissimilar with regard to constituents. The researchers tested for 244 representative constituents typically found in water. When detected, most constituents were in the parts-per-billion and parts-per-trillion range. DEET (an insect repellant) and caffeine were found in all water types and in virtually all samples. Triclosan (in antibacterial soap and toothpaste) was found in all water types, but detected in higher levels (parts-per-trillion) in reclaimed water than in surface or groundwater. Very few hormones/steroids were detected in samples, and when detected were at very low levels. Haloacetic acids (a disinfection by-product) were found in all types of samples, even groundwater. The largest difference between reclaimed water and the other waters appears to be that reclaimed water has been disinfected and thus has disinfection byproducts (due to chlorine use).

A 2005 study found that there had been no instances of illness or disease from either microbial pathogens or chemicals, and the risks of using reclaimed water for irrigation are not measurably different from irrigation using potable water.

A 2012 study conducted by the National Research Council in the United States found that the risk of exposure to certain microbial and chemical contaminants from drinking reclaimed water does not appear to be higher than the risk experienced in some current drinking water treatment systems, and may be orders of magnitude lower. This report recommends adjustments to the federal regulatory framework that could enhance public health protection for both planned and unplanned (or de facto reuse) and increase public confidence in water reuse.

== Environmental aspects ==
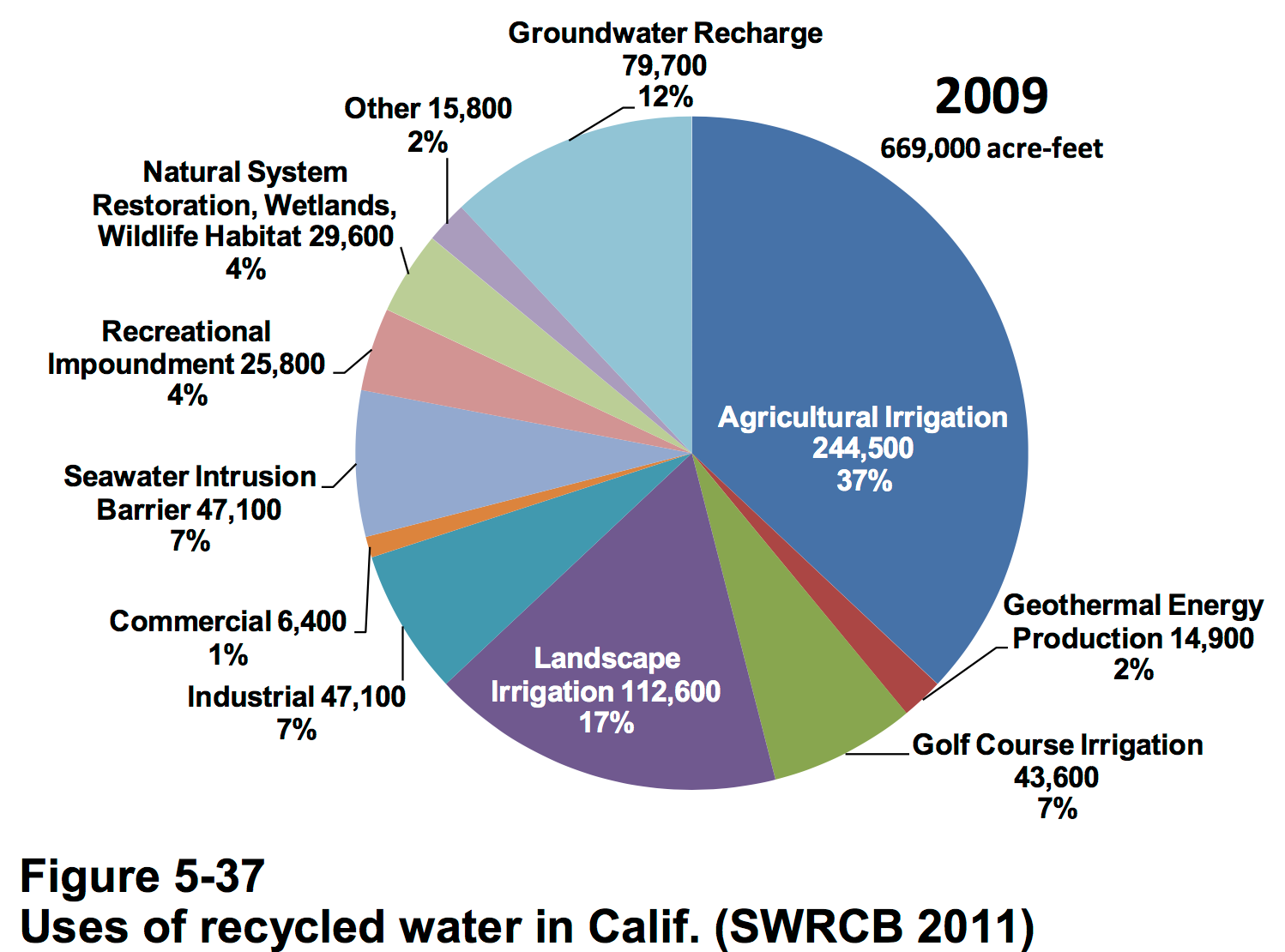
Uses of recycled water in California, 2011

Using reclaimed water for non-potable uses saves potable water for drinking, since less potable water will be used for non-potable uses.

It sometimes contains higher levels of nutrients such as nitrogen, phosphorus and oxygen which may help fertilize garden and agricultural plants when used for irrigation.

Fresh water makes up less than 3% of the world's water resources, and just 1% of that is readily available. Even though fresh water is scarce, just 3% of it is extracted for human consumption. The remaining water is mostly used for agriculture, which uses roughly two-thirds of all fresh water.

Reclaimed water can offer a viable and effective alternative to freshwater where freshwater supplies are scarce. Reclaimed water is utilized to maintain or increase lake levels, restore wetlands, and restore river flows during hot weather and droughts, protecting biodiversity. Additionally, reclaimed water is utilized for street cleaning, irrigation of urban green spaces, and industrial processes. Reclaimed water has the advantage of being a consistent source of water supply that is unaffected by seasonal droughts and weather changes.

The usage of water reclamation decreases the pollution sent to sensitive environments. It can also enhance wetlands, which benefits the wildlife depending on that ecosystem. It also helps to reduce the likelihood of drought as recycling of water reduces the use of fresh water supply from underground sources. For instance, the San Jose/Santa Clara Water Pollution Control Plant instituted a water recycling program to protect the San Francisco Bay area's natural salt water marshes.

The main potential risks that are associated with reclaimed wastewater reuse for irrigation purposes when the treatment is not adequate are the following:

1. Contamination of the food chain with microcontaminants, pathogens (i.e. bacteria, viruses, protozoa, helminths), or antibiotic resistance determinants;
2. Soil salinization and accumulation of various unknown constituents that might adversely affect agricultural production;
3. Distribution of the indigenous soil microbial communities;
4. Alteration of the physicochemical and microbiological properties of the soil and contribution to the accumulation of chemical/biological contaminants (e.g. heavy metals, chemicals (i.e. boron, nitrogen, phosphorus, chloride, sodium, pesticides/herbicides), natural chemicals (i.e. hormones), contaminants of emerging concern (CECs) (i.e. pharmaceuticals and their metabolites, personal care products, household chemicals and food additives and their transformation products), etc.) in it and subsequent uptake by plants and crops;
5. Excessive growth of algae and vegetation in canals carrying wastewater (i.e. eutrophication);
6. Groundwater quality degradation by the various reclaimed water contaminants, migrating and accumulating in the soil and aquifers.

== Guidelines and regulations ==
=== International organizations ===
- World Health Organization (WHO): "Guidelines for the safe use of wastewater, excreta and greywater" (2006).
- United Nations Environment Programme (UNEP): "Guidelines for municipal wastewater reuse in the Mediterranean region" (2005).
- United Nations Water Decade Programme on Capacity Development (UNW-DPC): Proceedings on the UNWater project "Safe use of wastewater in agriculture" (2013).

=== European Union ===
Since 26 June 2023 there is an EU regulation on minimum requirements for water reuse for irrigation purposes. The water quality requirements are divided into four categories depending on what is irrigated and how the irrigation is performed. The water quality parameters included are E.coli, BOD5, total suspended solids (TSS), turbidity, legionella, and intestinal nematodes (helminth eggs).

In the Water Framework Directive, reuse of water is mentioned as one of the possible measures to achieve the Directive's quality goals. However, this remains a relatively vague recommendation rather than a requirement: Part B of Annex VI refers to reuse as one of the "supplementary measures which Member States within each river basin district may choose to adopt as part of the programme of measures required under Article 11(4)".

Besides that, Article 12 of the Urban Wastewater Treatment Directive concerning the reuse of treated wastewater states that "treated wastewater shall be reused whenever appropriate", which some consider not specific enough to promote water reuse as it may leave too much room for interpretation as to what can be considered as an "appropriate" situation to reuse treated wastewater.

Despite the lack of common water reuse criteria at the EU level, several member states have issued their own legislative frameworks, regulations, or guidelines for different water reuse applications (e.g. Cyprus, France, Greece, Italy, and Spain).

However, an evaluation carried out by the European Commission on the water reuse standards of several member states concluded that they differed in their approach. There are important differences among the standards regarding permitted uses, parameters to be monitored, and limit values allowed. This lack of harmonization among water reuse standards could potentially create trade barriers for agricultural goods irrigated with reclaimed water. Once on the common market, the level of safety in the producing member states may be not considered sufficient by the importing countries. The most representative standards on wastewater reuse from European member states are the following:

- Cyprus: Law 106 (I) 2002 Water and Soil pollution control and associated regulations (KDP 772/2003, KDP 269/2005) (Issuing Institutions: Ministry of Agriculture, Natural resources and Environment, Water Development Department).
- France: Jorf num.0153, 4 July 2014. Order of 2014, related to the use of water from treated urban wastewater for irrigation of crops and green areas (Issuing Institutions: Ministry of Public Health, Ministry of Agriculture, Food and Fisheries, Ministry of Ecology, Energy and Sustainability).
- Greece: CMD No 145116. Measures, limits and procedures for reuse of treated wastewater (Issuing Institutions: Ministry of Environment, Energy and Climate Change).
- Italy: DM 185/2003. Technical measures for reuse of wastewater (Issuing Institutions: Ministry of Environment, Ministry of Agriculture, Ministry of Public Health).
- Portugal: NP 4434 2005. Reuse of reclaimed urban water for irrigation (Issuing Institutions: Portuguese Institute for Quality).
- Spain: RD 1620/2007. The legal framework for the reuse of treated wastewater (Issuing Institutions: Ministry of Environment, Ministry of Agriculture, Food and Fisheries, Ministry of Health).

By 2023, a new EU agriculture law may raise water reuse by six times, from 1.7 billion m^{3} to 6.6 billion m^{3}, and cut water stress by 5%.

=== United States ===
In the U.S., the Clean Water Act of 1972 mandated elimination of the discharge of untreated waste from municipal and industrial sources to make water safe for fishing and recreation. The US federal government provided billions of dollars in grants for building sewage treatment plants around the country. Modern treatment plants, usually using oxidation and/or chlorination in addition to primary and secondary treatment, were required to meet certain standards.

Los Angeles County's sanitation districts started providing treated wastewater for landscape irrigation in parks and golf courses in 1929. The first reclaimed water facility in California was built at San Francisco's Golden Gate Park in 1932. The Water Replenishment District of Southern California was the first groundwater agency to obtain permitted use of recycled water for groundwater recharge in 1962.

Denver's Direct Potable Water Reuse Demonstration Project examined the technical, scientific, and public acceptance aspects of DPR from 1979 to 1993. A chronic lifetime whole-animal health effects study on the 1 MGD advanced treatment plant product was conducted in conjunction with a comprehensive assessment of the chemical and microbiological water quality. The $30 million study found that the water produced met all health standards and compared favorably with Denver's high quality drinking water. Further, the projected cost was lower than estimates for obtaining distant new water supplies.

Reclaimed water is not regulated by the U.S. Environmental Protection Agency (EPA), but the EPA has developed water reuse guidelines that were most recently updated in 2012. The EPA Guidelines for Water Reuse represents the international standard for best practices in water reuse. The document was developed under a Cooperative Research and Development Agreement between the EPA, the U.S. Agency for International Development (USAID), and the global consultancy CDM Smith. The Guidelines provide a framework for states to develop regulations that incorporate the best practices and address local requirements.

Reuse of reclaimed water is an increasingly common response to water scarcity in many parts of the United States. Reclaimed water is being reused directly for various non-potable uses in the United States, including urban landscape irrigation of parks, school yards, highway medians and golf courses; fire protection; commercial uses such as vehicle washing; industrial reuse such as cooling water, boiler water and process water; environmental and recreational uses such as the creation or restoration of wetlands; as well as agricultural irrigation. In some cases, such as in Irvine Ranch Water District in Orange County, it is also used for flushing toilets.

It was estimated that in 2002 a total of 1.7 billion US gallons (6,400,000 m^{3}) per day, or almost 3% of public water supply, were being directly reused. California reused 0.6 and Florida 0.5 billion US gallons (1,900,000 m^{3}) per day respectively. Twenty-five states had regulations regarding the use of reclaimed water in 2002. Planned direct reuse of reclaimed water was initiated in 1932 with the construction of a reclaimed water facility at San Francisco's Golden Gate Park. Reclaimed water is typically distributed with a color-coded dual piping network that keeps reclaimed water pipes completely separate from potable water pipes.

==== Trade associations ====
- The WateReuse Association is a trade association in the United States which promotes reuse of water. According to their website, "The WateReuse Association is the nation's only trade association solely dedicated to advancing laws, policy, funding, and public acceptance of recycled water. WateReuse represents a coalition of utilities that recycle water, businesses that support the development of recycled water projects, and consumers of recycled water." The WateReuse Research Foundation was merged into the WateReuse Association on July 11, 2016.

=== Other countries ===
- Canada: "Canadian guidelines for domestic reclaimed water for use in toilet and urinal flushing" (2010).
- China: China National Reclaimed Water Quality Standard; China National Standard GB/T 18920-2002, GB/T 19923-2005, GB/T 18921-2002, GB 20922-2007 and GB/T 19772-2005.
- Israel: Ministry of Health regulation (2005).
- Japan: National Institute for Land and Infrastructure Management: Report of the Microbial Water Quality Project on Treated Sewage and Reclaimed Wastewater (2008).
- Jordan: Jordanian technical base n. 893/2006 Jordan water reuse management Plan (policy).
- Mexico: Mexican Standard NOM-001-ECOL-1996 governing wastewater reuse in Agriculture.
- South Africa: The latest revision of the Water Services Act of 1997 relating to grey-water and treated effluent (Department of Water Affairs and Forestry, 2001).
- Tunisia: Standard for the use of treated wastewater in agriculture (NT 106–109 of 1989) and list of crops that can be irrigated with treated wastewater (Ministry of Agriculture, 1994).
- Australia: National level Guidelines: Government of Australia (the Natural Resource Management Ministerial Council, the Environment Protection and Heritage Council, and the Australian Health Ministers Conference (NRMMC-EPHC-AHMC)): Guidelines for water recycling: managing health and environmental risks" Phase 1, 2006.

== History ==
Wastewater reuse (planned or unplanned) is a practice which has been applied throughout human history and is closely connected to the development of sanitation.

== Country examples ==
=== Australia ===
When there are droughts in Australia, interest in reclaimed effluent options increases. Two major capital cities in Australia, Adelaide and Brisbane, have already committed to adding reclaimed effluent to their dwindling dams. The former has also built a desalination plant to help battle any future water shortages. Brisbane has been seen as a leader in this trend, and other cities and towns will review the Western Corridor Recycled Water Project once completed. Goulburn, Canberra, Newcastle, and Regional Victoria, Australia are already considering building a reclaimed effluent process. Indirect potable reuse (IPR) has been considered for regional communities in Goulburn, NSW, the Australian Capital Territory (ACT) and Toowoomba, Queensland.

=== Israel ===
As of 2010, Israel leads the world in the proportion of water it recycles. Israel treats 80% of its sewage (400 billion liters a year), and 100% of the sewage from the Tel Aviv metropolitan area is treated and reused as irrigation water for agriculture and public works. In 2012 the Dan Region Wastewater Treatment Plant was cited as a global model by the United Nations. The plant, known locally as Shafdan, was lauded for its unique method of using the natural filtration qualities of sand to improve the quality of sewage. In 2010, about 400 million cubic metres/year of treated wastewater was reused, primarily in agriculture. This constitutes about 40% of water use in agriculture.

=== Namibia ===
Reuse of treated wastewater is practiced in Namibia in many urban areas such as Swakopmund, Walvis Bay, Tsumeb, Otjiwarongo, Okahandja, Mariental, Oranjemund and Windhoek. In most localities, water is reused for irrigation. In Windhoek, reclaimed water is also used for potable uses. Windhoek has been using recovered water for fifty years. Approximately 30% of the city's 400 000 residents' present drinking water supply is made up of reclaimed water. A representative example of direct potable reuse is the case of Windhoek (Namibia, New Goreangab Water Reclamation Plant (NGWRP)), where treated wastewater has been blended with drinking water for more than 45 years. It is based on the multiple treatment barriers concept (i.e. pre-ozonation, enhanced coagulation/dissolved air flotation/rapid sand filtration, and subsequent ozone, biological activated carbon/granular activated carbon, ultrafiltration (UF), chlorination) to reduce associated risks and improve the water quality. Since the year 1968 the capital of Namibia, Windhoek, has used reclaimed wastewater as one of their drinking water sources, which nowadays represent about 14% of the city's drinking water production. In 2001, the New Goreangab Reclamation Plant (NGWRP) was built by the City of Windhoek and it started to deliver drinking water in 2002 (about 21,000 m^{3} of water per day).

=== Singapore ===
In Singapore, reclaimed water is branded as NEWater and is bottled directly from an advanced water purification facility for educational and celebratory purposes. Though most of the reused water is used for high-tech industry in Singapore, a small amount is returned to reservoirs for drinking water. NEWater is the brand name given to ultra-pure water that is produced from reclaimed water. Wastewater, which is called "used water" in Singapore, is treated in conventional advanced wastewater treatment plants that are called reclamation plants in Singapore. The effluent from the reclamation plants is either discharged into the sea or undergoes further microfiltration, reverse osmosis and ultraviolet treatment.

Water reclaimation was pursued primarily due to geopolitical tensions arising from Singapore's dependency on water imported from Malaysia.

=== South Africa ===
In South Africa, the main driver for wastewater reuse is drought conditions. For example, in Beaufort West, South Africa's a direct wastewater reclamation plant (WRP) for the production of drinking water was constructed in the end of 2010, as a result of acute water scarcity (production of 2,300 m^{3} per day). The process configuration based on multi-barrier concept and includes the following treatment processes: sand filtration, UF, two-stage RO, and permeate disinfected by ultraviolet light (UV).

The town George faced water shortages and had decided on an IPR strategy (2009/2010), where final effluents from its Outeniqua WWTP are treated to a very high quality through UF and disinfection prior to being returned to the main storage facility, the Garden Route Dam, where they are combined with current raw water supplies. This initiative augments the existing supply by 10,000 m^{3} per day, approximately one third of the drinking water demand. The process configuration includes the following treatment processes: drum screen, UF, and chlorine disinfection. Provision has been made for powdered activated carbon (PAC) addition at George WTW, if required as an additional operational barrier.

== See also ==
- Bioretention
- One Water (water management)
- Water conservation
- Water heat recycling
- Water recycling shower

== Sources ==
- Alcalde, Sanz Laura; Gawlik, Bernd (2014). Water Reuse in Europe: Relevant guidelines, needs for and barriers to innovation. doi:10.2788/29234. ISBN 978-92-79-44399-2.
- Guidelines for Water Reuse (PDF) (Report). United States Environmental Protection Agency. September 2012. EPA/600/R-12/618.
