= Urban Waste Water Treatment Directive =

EU directive

Directive 91/271/EEC
- European Union directive
- Title: Urban Waste Water Directive
- Made by: European Council
- Made under: Article 130 S
- Journal reference: L 135, 30 May 1991 P. 40 – 52

History
- Date made: 21 May 1991

The Urban Waste Water Treatment Directive 1991 (91/271/EEC) is a European Union directive concerning urban waste water "collection, treatment and discharge of urban waste water and the treatment and discharge of waste water from certain industrial sectors". It aims "to protect the environment from adverse effects of waste water discharges from cities and "certain industrial sectors". Council Directive 91/271/EEC on Urban Wastewater Treatment was adopted on 21 May 1991, amended by the Commission Directive 98/15/EC.

It prescribes the waste water collection and treatment in urban agglomerations with a population equivalent of over 2000, and more advanced treatment in places with a population equivalent greater than 10,000 in "sensitive areas".

== Description ==
The Urban Waste Water Treatment Directive (full title "Council Directive 91/271/EEC of 21 May 1991 concerning urban waste-water treatment") is a European Union directive regarding urban wastewater collection, wastewater treatment and its discharge, as well as the treatment and discharge of "waste water from certain industrial sectors". It was adopted on 21 May 1991. It aims "to protect the environment from the adverse effects of urban waste water discharges and discharges from certain industrial sectors" by mandating waste water collection and treatment in urban agglomerations with a population equivalent of over 2000, and more advanced treatment in places with a population equivalent above 10,000 in sensitive areas.

Member states in the European Union maintain and operate waste-water treatment plants to conform to the Urban Waste Water Treatment Directive which sets standards for both treatment and disposal of sewage for communities of more than 200 person equivalents. Each member state is obliged to enact the requirements of the directive through appropriate local legislation. This directive also links to the Bathing Waters Directive and to the environmental standards set in the Water Framework Directive which are designed to protect all legitimate end uses of the receiving environment.

Commission Decision 93/481/EEC defines the information that Member States should provide the commission on the state of implementation of the Directive.

Conventional wastewater treatment plants currently service over 90% of the EU population. Continuing implementation of the Urban Wastewater Treatment Directives plans to lower the EU's contribution to global microplastics discharge into the oceans. According to a cost-benefit analysis prepared for the proposed Directive, the investment required to implement quaternary treatment in wastewater treatment plants with a capacity of at least 10,000 person equivalents in the EU is estimated to be around €2.6 billion per year.

=== Sensitive areas ===
The directive defines sensitive areas, as "freshwater bodies, estuaries and coastal waters which are eutrophic or which may become eutrophic if protective action is not taken", "surface freshwaters intended for the abstraction of drinking water which contain or are likely to contain more than 50 mg/L of nitrates", areas where further treatment is necessary to comply with other directives, such as the directives on fish waters, on bathing waters, on shellfish waters, on the conservation of wild birds and natural habitats, etc.

The directive contains a derogation for areas designated as "less sensitive"; such derogations were approved for areas in Portugal.

== Implementation ==
Member states were required to make waste water treatment facilities available

- By 31 December 1998 for all places with a population equivalent of over 10,000 where the effluent discharged into a sensitive area.
- By 31 December 1998 for all places with a population equivalent of over 15,000, which discharged their effluent into so-called "normal areas" and that biodegradable waste water produced by food-processing plants, which discharged directly into water bodies, fulfilled certain conditions.
- by 31 December 2005 for all places with a population equivalent between 2000 and 10 000 where effluent is discharged into a sensitive area,
- by 31 December 2005 for all places with a population equivalent between 10,000 and 15,000 where the effluent is not discharged into such a sensitive area

In a 2004 Commission report on implementation by the member states, the Commission noted that some member states, in particular France and Spain, had been tardy in providing the required information, and infringement procedures had been initiated. The report mentioned Spain's non-provision of any advanced treatment in the catchment areas of rivers identified as sensitive in their downstream section, such as the Ebro and the Guadalquivir; Italy's implementation in the catchment area of the Po River, the delta and adjacent coastal waters; and the United Kingdom's interpretation and implementation of the directive in regard to the catchment areas of sensitive areas. Most member states planned to achieve conformity with the Directive by 2005 or 2008 at the latest.

In 2020 the Commission published its latest implementation report that covers over 23,600 agglomerations where people (and to a limited extent industry) generate wastewater. As the UWWTD will soon be revised in light of meeting the goals of the European Green Deal, this report carries out an evaluation of the directive. This was followed by an impact assessment in order to determine policy options for an update, fit for the future UWWTD. Over the last decade, the compliance rates have gone up, with 95% for collection, 88% for secondary (biological) treatment, and 86% for more stringent treatment. There is positive trend in general, but full compliance with the directive is still not achieved. This is necessary, because this would show significant reductions in pollutant loads in the Member States. In the long term, more investments are needed to reach and maintain compliance with the directive. Several towns and cities are still building or renewing infrastructure for the collection of wastewater. To support the Member States, the commission has set up funding and financial initiatives.

== Political significance ==
The Urban Waste Water Directive marked a shift from legislation aimed at end-use standards to stricter legislation aimed at regulating water quality at the source. The directive applied both to domestic waste water and to waste water from industrial sectors, both of which account for much of the pollution. The Directive is an example of the detailed nature of European Union legislation and resulted in "significant costs in many member states".

Nine years after the directive was adopted, considerable variations remained in the provision of sewage treatment in the different member states.

== Planned Revision ==
On 13 July 2018, the European Commission published a Consultation on the Evaluation of the Urban Waste Water Treatment Directive ahead of a potential revision. Since its adoption in 1991, new technical advances on treatment techniques for waste and emerging pollutants have been identified that might require removal. In addition, the EU has since enlarged from 12 to 28 countries and new different experiences and challenges need to be taken into account.

However, the biggest challenge of the revision will be to exploit the potential the wastewater treatment sector can contribute to the circular economy agenda and the fight against climate change. Globally, the wastewater treatment sector consumes 1% of the global total energy consumption. Under a business as usual scenario, this figure is expected to increase by 60% by 2040 compared to 2014. With the introduction of energy efficiency requirements, the energy consumption of the wastewater treatment sector can be reduced by 50% only by using current technologies. On top of that, there are also opportunities to produce enough energy from wastewater to turn the whole water sector energy neutral. It uses the energy embedded in the sludge by producing biogas through anaerobic digestion. These features have been mainly overlooked due to the over-riding objective for utilities to meet existing and future needs for wastewater treatment.

In October 2022, the planned revision included stricter goals and policies. These had time frames on either 2030, 2035, or 2040. The revision would have inclusion of areas with smaller populations, stricter limits on Nitrogen and Phosphorus, reduction of micropollutants, a goal of Energy Neutrality for all purification plants with over 10,000 person equivalents by 2040, tracking of diseases, additional sanctions, and other goals. This proposal has currently been read by the European Council.

== See also ==
- Water supply and sanitation in the European Union
- Population equivalent
- Sustainable Development Goal 6
- Water, energy and food security nexus
- Sewage sludge treatment
