= One Water (water management) =

One Water is a term encompassing the management of all water sources in an integrated and sustainable way considering all water sources and uses. This idea stems from core principles of providing affordable water access for everyone.

== Origins and influences ==
The term “One Water” refers to integrated and effective water management practices that are “older than Texas.” Holistic, system-wide, interconnected approaches to water have been used before.

Holistic water planning by municipalities has become an international trend. The international water community developed Integrated Water Resources Management (IWRM) in the early 2000s to protect water resources and promote sustainability. The Global Water Partnership has an IWRM Action hub to share information and insights into implementing an integrated water program.

== Definition and core principles ==
The Water Research Foundation (WRF) defines One Water as an integrated planning and implementation approach to managing finite water resources for long-term resilience and reliability, meeting both community and ecosystem needs. While many cities manage various water sources and disposal systems separately, One Water emphasizes integrating water and land resources for a holistic planning approach to water management. The importance of all water sources is stressed. One Water principles involve taking an interconnected approach to complex issues such as water infrastructure crises, environmental and public health crises, droughts, and climate change at a all scales: individual and building, local, regional, state, country, and international.

== Related scholarly research ==
Jiang et al. 2021 developed a model using One Water concepts to show how thinking about interconnections can improve modeling and assessing the hydrologic cycle.

== Initiatives and organizations ==
The United Nations and World Health Organization host the WHO/UNICEF Joint Monitoring Programme (JMP) for Water Supply, Sanitation and Hygiene Program that uses One Water principles to monitor progress on local to global scales for attaining Sustainable Development Goal targets for “universal and equitable access to safe drinking water, sanitation, and hygiene.”

The Environmental Protection Agency noted that meeting the Clean Water Act (1972 requirements for managing and accessing water would be more efficient using an overall approach to water management. The agency, along with the National Oceanic and Atmospheric Administration (NOAA) and the U.S. Water Alliance have provided webinars and other guidance for using a One Water approach for water management. The U.S. Water Alliance also has more initiatives to support One Water, including the One Water Council to bring organizations together, and Value of Water Campaign to educate about the importance of all water sources.

One Water Panel helps develop strategies for integrating water source development and management to more effectively meet present and future water needs and address climate change impacts.

The National Association of Clean Water Agencies (NACWA) and Association of Metropolitan Water Agencies (AMWA) have developed a campaign for Affordable Water, Resilient Communities to increase political awareness around water issues.

== Examples of One Water strategies and implementation ==
=== Water management education ===
American Rivers uses a holistic approach to water management and hosted a 2-day conference to collect ideas for helping cities adapt an integrated water management approach in 2016.

The Southeast Michigan Council of Governments (SEMCOG) has a One Water Program to educate about water use and systems and their interrelationships and as a water stewardship approach. They hosted events at the 2023 Great Lakes and Fresh Water Week, posted videos to showcase benefits of a one-water approach, and have a series of articles.

The University of Illinois Urbana-Champaign includes One Water among five curricula toward a Bachelor of Science degree in Environmental engineering. Their One Water program emphasizes application of physical, chemical, and biological principles to design innovative water quality control processes for safe and reliable community or household drinking water, sanitation, stormwater management, and resource (water, nutrient, energy) recovery systems.

=== Infrastructure and sustainability ===
One Water concepts are also used in building planning and sustainable development. Blue Hole Primary School, Texas used One Water concepts as it built the school.

=== Cities ===
Cities have developed a variety of One Water Strategies, and there is guidance and studies for helping more cities develop their plans. The Water Research Foundation and Colorado State University are developing guidance for One Water Cities (2020–2023). International Water Association developed a Cities of the Future integrated water management program.

==== United States ====
The City of Los Angeles launched the One Water LA 2040 Plan, an integrated and unified approach to sustainably manage all water resources—surface water, groundwater, potable water, wastewater, recycled water, and stormwater.

Palo Alto is developing a One Water Plan as part of their climate Action-Protection and Adaptation planning priority.

San Francisco, California, has a broad OneWater SF Vision with many resources into their water planning, including “water, energy, financial, human, community partnerships and natural resources”

Denver, Colorado, adopted a One Water Plan in September 2021.

Wake County, North Carolina started a One Water Plan for its municipalities with a public visioning survey in May 2023.

Milwaukee, Wisconsin, has a One Water approach with information tailored to different audiences at #onewaterourwater

==== Worldwide ====
Vancouver, British Columbia, uses a One Water Approach to address changes in its watershed.

== Awards ==
One Water Panel Honolulu received the US Water Prize for the Outstanding Public Sector Category, US Water Alliance in 2022

== One Water conferences ==
One Water Summits were held in 2015, 2017 (New Orleans, Louisiana), and 2018 (Twin Cities, Minnesota)

A City Summit for cities to adapt One Water plans was held in Charlotte, North Carolina November 15–18, 2017.

== See also ==
Reclaimed water

Water conservation
