= Dual piping =

Dual piping, also called dual plumbing, dual reticulation or a dual water system, is a plumbing and water-distribution arrangement in which potable water and non-potable water are supplied through physically separate pipe networks. The non-potable network usually carries reclaimed water, treated greywater, harvested rainwater or another alternative water source for uses that do not require drinking-water quality.

Dual piping may be installed at the scale of a single building, a housing development or a municipal reclaimed-water distribution system. Common non-potable uses include toilet and urinal flushing, landscape irrigation, vehicle washing, street cleaning, cooling systems and some industrial processes.

== Design and operation ==
A dual piping system keeps drinking water and non-potable water in separate mains, service connections, meters and internal plumbing. In a centralized system, reclaimed water is treated at a wastewater facility and then conveyed through a separate distribution network to customers. In an onsite system, water generated at or near a building, such as greywater, stormwater, roof runoff or wastewater, is collected, treated, stored and reused locally.

The second network is sometimes known as a "third pipe" because it is added to the usual drinking-water supply and sewerage systems. In parts of Australia, residential developments with recycled water commonly use this model, with recycled water delivered through separate purple pipes for approved non-drinking uses.

== Safety and regulation ==
The principal safety concern in dual piping is a cross-connection, in which potable and non-potable systems are accidentally joined, allowing non-potable water to enter drinking-water plumbing. Cross-connections can occur through design errors, construction mistakes, later plumbing alterations or backflow events. The National Academies identifies inadvertent cross-connections between potable and non-potable distribution systems as a route by which people may be exposed to contaminants in reclaimed water.

Controls include physical separation of pipework, backflow prevention assemblies, inspection, pressure testing, labeling and clear assignment of responsibility among water suppliers, builders and property owners. Washington state regulations, for example, require reclaimed-water generators, distributors, users and potable-water purveyors to act to eliminate or prevent cross-connections between water supplies. Many jurisdictions also require non-potable or reclaimed-water piping and outlets to be marked purple; Texas rules require exposed piping and piping within buildings for reclaimed-water systems to be purple pipe or painted purple.

== Benefits and limitations ==
Dual piping can reduce demand for potable water by substituting treated non-potable water for applications where drinking-water quality is unnecessary. Onsite non-potable reuse can also reduce the volume of water entering sewers and may lower energy use where it avoids transporting water over long distances. These advantages are most relevant in water-stressed regions, large buildings, campuses, industrial sites and new developments where a second pipe network can be planned before construction.

The main limitations are cost, complexity and the need for continuing oversight. Retrofitting existing buildings or neighborhoods can be expensive because walls, streets or yards may need to be opened to install separate pipes. Operation also requires monitoring of water quality, storage, pumps, valves, signage and cross-connection controls. A Water Research Foundation study of U.S. dual water systems identified about 335 systems and found that most were used to extend scarce supplies or provide wastewater-management options rather than primarily to reduce drinking-water infrastructure costs. The same study reported that cross-connections had occurred in some case studies, although major health problems were not identified.

== See also ==
- Greywater
- Reclaimed water
- Water conservation
- Water recycling
- Rainwater harvesting
