= Denver's Direct Potable Water Reuse Demonstration Project =

Municipal water project

Denver Direct Potable Water Reuse Demonstration Project
- Mission statement: Assess the safety, quality, technical feasibility, and public and regulatory acceptance of direct potable water reuse.
- Location: Denver, Colorado
- Owner: Denver Water
- Country: United States
- Key people: William C. Lauer, project manager
- Established: 1979
- Disestablished: 1990
- Funding: US $30 million
- Status: Complete

The Denver Direct Potable Water Reuse Demonstration Project was an initiative to evaluate the feasibility of using treated wastewater, including sewer water, as a source of drinking water in Denver, Colorado. The intent was to demonstrate that the treated water was of sufficient quality to be piped directly into the Denver drinking water system. Conducted between 1979 and 1990, this $30 million project was managed and operated by Denver Water, the city's primary water utility, and was partially funded by the United States Environmental Protection Agency (EPA). The project's primary objectives were to assess the safety, quality, technical feasibility, and public and regulatory acceptance of direct potable water reuse.

The central feature of the project was a 1-million-gallon-per-day (mgd) treatment plant, based on advanced water treatment unit operations, continuously producing treated water evaluated for safe production of water for direct consumption. Safety and efficacy as well as technical and economic viability were also evaluated as was public awareness and outreach.

By the end of the project, all of the objectives were fully satisfied, indicating likely viability of direct potable water reuse.

== Historical justification ==
In the 1970s, while the water resources of the Denver Water Department (Denver Water) at the time were sufficient to meet the needs of its service area, anticipated growth in demand threatened to surpass the department's available supplies. To address this concern, Denver Water explored several means of expanding its supply, including the use of wastewater effluent, conservation efforts, and large-scale storage or diversion projects.

New storage and diversion projects located far from the Denver metropolitan area carried an unacceptable cost, and environmental concerns raised doubts about the viability of large-scale diversion. As a result, these options were dismissed.

Conservation, while acceptable to the public, was an unproven alternative. Denver Water had already launched an aggressive conservation campaign, with uncertain likelihood of satisfying the anticipated water needs of the Denver metropolitan area.

Colorado water law required that wastewater be returned to the river from which it originated after one beneficial use. Trans-mountain water, which is diverted from one river basin to another, is exempt from this requirement. As a result, Denver had an estimated 100 million gallons per day (mgd) of water available for reuse. After considering various water-use options, such as exchanging wastewater effluent for upstream raw water, industrial reclamation, and non-potable reuse, Denver Water determined that direct potable reuse (DPR) was the solution that could best address the projected supply shortfall. Additionally, projections indicated that by the early 2000s, treated wastewater effluent for DPR would be economically competitive with developing new conventional water sources. However, significant research was required before this untested alternative could be implemented.

== Project plan ==
After initially being rejected three years earlier, Denver Water and the EPA signed a cooperative agreement in 1979. This grant provided US $7 million for the project, with the remaining US $23 million provided by Denver Water.

Specific objectives of the project in the finalized agreement were: Establish product water safety; Demonstrate process reliability; Improve public awareness of direct potable water reuse; Increase regulatory agency awareness through technical reports and scientific publications; and Develop data for full-scale implementation estimates.

The project addressed several key areas of concern, such as product quality, public health, economic viability, and the technological feasibility of treating wastewater to drinking water standards. One of the most significant aspects of the demonstration was a two-year animal health effects study, which involved the use of treated water to evaluate its safety. This study specifically focused on reproductive health and the potential long-term impacts of consuming treated wastewater on multiple generations of rats and mice.

Following the provisions of the cooperative agreement, Denver Water organized a committee of twenty-three experts to review the project plans and advise the staff on technical and scientific issues. Initially, these advisors were divided into separate groups for plant design and operation, water quality analysis, and health effects. Later, these groups were merged into a single project advisory committee which served for the duration of the project.

=== Concept and design ===
After approximately 10 years of small-scale experimentation and pilot testing, in 1981 construction started on the 1 million gallon per day Potable Water Reuse Demonstration Plant, which became operational in 1985. The raw water supply for the reuse plant was unchlorinated secondary effluent from the metropolitan Denver wastewater treatment facility, which met all requirements for discharge to the South Platte River. These stream standards focus on protecting aquatic life and are not for drinking water. A 1 million gallon per day flow stream was intercepted prior to chlorination, to avoid byproducts formed by its application, and diverted to the Potable Water Reuse Demonstration Plant where it was the source for further treatment.

The treatment process included, successively: high pH lime treatment, single or two-stage recarbonation, pressure filtration, selective ion exchange for ammonia removal, two stages of activated carbon adsorption, ozonation, reverse osmosis, air stripping, and chlorine dioxide disinfection. Side-stream processes included a fluidized bed carbon reactivation furnace, vacuum sludge filtration, and a selective ion exchange regenerant recovery system. The plant design adopted a multiple safety barrier approach so as to increase process reliability by using a combination of unit processes, ensuring that no single process was solely responsible for the removal of any specific single contaminant.

=== Staffing ===
Staffing requirements were part of the project goal of providing data for full-scale implementation. For this reason, the plant operations and maintenance personnel mirrored Denver Water's traditional water treatment plants both in number and qualifications. During operations, two operators worked on 12-hour shifts with six relief operators performing maintenance duties and filling in for absences. All operators were state certified for water and wastewater operations, including certification at the highest level for lead operators. While staffing was substantially complete by May 1983, full operation started in October 1985 with staff training continuing in the interim.

== Final configuration ==
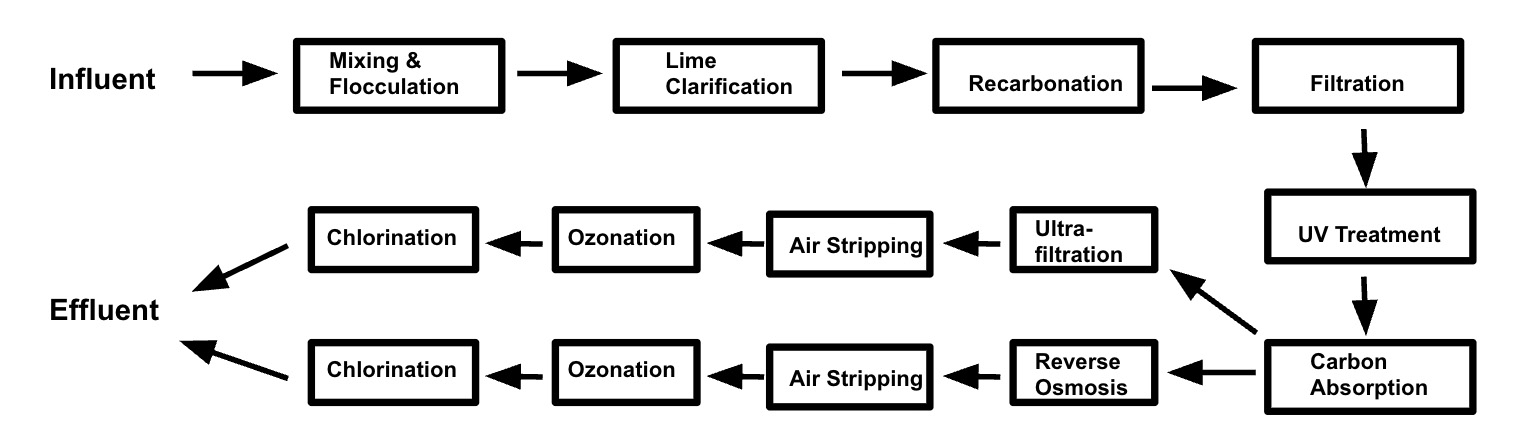
Process Diagram for Denver's Direct Potable Water Reuse Demonstration Project showing the treatment sequence during the health effects testing project phase

During the performance testing phase of the project (1985-1988), the plant configuration was modified several times in order to examine various unit processes and treatment sequences. These modifications enabled elimination of unreliable or unnecessary treatment steps without compromising water quality. The refinements resulted in the processing plant configuration that was used for the animal testing portion of the project.

Operational steps in the process were: high pH lime clarification, recarbonation, granular media filtration, UV, activated carbon adsorption, reverse osmosis or ultrafiltration, air stripping, ozone disinfection, chloramine residual disinfection.

== Quality evaluation ==
=== Water quality ===
Water contaminants measured during the testing portion of the project included organic and inorganic chemicals, radiological isotopes, and microorganisms such as bacteria and viruses. The treated water was continuously assessed against EPA and international standards, with Denver Water's drinking water being the primary benchmark for comparison. The project's objective, to ensure the treated water met or surpassed these established safety standards, was achieved.

=== Health effects study ===
The study of health effects of the Denver Potable Water Resuse Project was based on the recommendations of the National Research Council's Panel on Quality Criteria for Reuse, which included the need for chronic toxicity testing using whole-animal models. This study was designed to complement the water quality testing program by focusing on the fraction of organic constituents that could not be analyzed by current methods.

The project included two-year chronic toxicity and carcinogenicity studies in rats and mice, as well as reproductive toxicity studies in rats. The water samples tested included reclaimed water from the process treated through either reverse osmosis or ultrafiltration, in addition to samples from Denver's municipal drinking water supply as benchmarks. Across all sample types, no treatment-related adverse health effects were observed.

== Cost estimates ==
Operation and maintenance (O&M) costs for each treatment process in the 1 million gallons per day (mgd) reuse demonstration facility were calculated based on actual operational data collected between 1985 and 1990. These data were used to compare various treatment sequences and contributed to the selection of the final health effects treatment system. Construction costs estimates were obtained from engineering tables. All costs were expressed in January 1994 US dollars.

Lower cost estimates were obtained by relying exclusively (for both construction and O&M) on engineering table values and by evaluating a split treatment approach based on 50% reverse osmosis and 50% ultrafiltration. This method yielded a minimum estimated cost of $1.83 per 1,000 gallons. Overall, the cost range for DPR was estimated at $1.83 to $2.60 per 1,000 gallons. These figures compared favorably with similarly uncertain estimates for conventional water supply augmentation, which ranged from $0.86 to $3.30 per 1,000 gallons.

== Outreach ==
=== Public awareness ===
In addition to scientific and technical evaluations, the project included a public awareness campaign to inform and engage Denver residents. Tours of the treatment plant provided the general public with firsthand insight into the treatment process. Various media outlets, including television, radio, and newspapers, were used to disseminate information about the progress and findings of the project.

The project included surveys measuring public attitudes toward the concept of potable water reuse. University researchers evaluated how the project influenced public perceptions and acceptance of the idea of drinking water sourced from treated wastewater. One measure of success was to inform more than 50,000 Denver residents about potable reuse, a metric that was achieved and surpassed.

The demonstration facility provided guided tours of the demonstration facility serving as the focal point, with more than 7,000 visitors participating in the tours, providing firsthand exposure to the treatment process and its objectives.

A periodic newsletter published as part of the project communicated to the public progress on the project milestones, with a circulation of over 2,000 by the final issue. Informational inserts with information about water reuse (bill stuffers) were distributed to over 200,000 households on multiple occasions.

Media coverage included numerous newspaper articles and television segments that documented the project's progress. A 26-minute documentary entitled Pure Water Again was produced and made available to community access channels and local public television stations. The documentary had an estimated viewership of approximately 50,000. This outcome in combination with the number of residents attending plant tours, and the number receiving informational inserts in water bills, exceeded the public awareness goal.

=== Technical review ===
While the primary focus of the outreach was on public education, the program also engaged suitable technical and regulatory communities to build credibility and foster acceptance. Over 50 presentations were delivered at technical conferences and meetings, and more than 100 technical articles were published in professional journals and industry periodicals. In addition, the project was extensively cited in presentations at technical conferences and scientific journals.

== Outcome ==
The Denver Direct Potable Water Reuse Demonstration Project issued a final report in 1993. The project demonstrated that the five primary objectives were fully satisfied and that direct potable water reuse is a possible means of satisfying future water supply needs for the Denver Metropolitan Area.

Regarding specific objectives, comprehensive physical, chemical, and microbiological testing confirmed that the reclaimed water met or exceeded purity standards of conventional domestic water supplies. These tests included evaluation of chronic toxicity and carcinogenicity over a two year period, as well as two-generation reproductive studies. The results showed no adverse health effects.

The treatment plant unit operations proceeded for 24 hours per day over a five year period, consistently meeting Denver Water's quality standards, demonstrating the reliability objective. These data resulted in cost estimates that compared favorably with projected costs for conventional water supply augmentation projects in Denver.

The public outreach component of the project reached approximately 50,000 Denver residents through various educational initiatives. Public opinion was generally cautiously optimistic, with most respondents expressing willingness to accept potable water reuse, provided its necessity was demonstrated and its safety assured. Results of the project were published extensively for evaluation by subject matter experts, laying the ground work for pursuing regulatory approval.

While the project successfully met its objectives, Denver Water emphasized water conservation efforts in the time following completion of the project.

== Related projects ==
The Denver Direct Potable Water Reuse Demonstration Project is in contrast to other projects which made indirect use of reclaimed water. An example of indirect use of reclaimed water is the project in Orange County, California, which injects the reclaimed water into the groundwater. Other current water reclamation projects make use of decentralized water processing, unlike the centralized process of the Denver Direct Potable Water Reuse Demonstration Project.

== See also ==
- Reclaimed water
- Water reuse in California
- Blackwater (waste)
- Potable water
