= Urban Water Journal =

Academic journal

- Discipline: Urban stream, sewerage, water resources
- Language: English
- Edited by: David Butler, Alberto Campisano, Christos Makropoulos, Čedo Maksimović

Publication details
- History: 2004–present
- Publisher: Taylor & Francis
- Frequency: 10/year
- Impact factor: 2.081 (2020)

Standard abbreviations
- ISO 4: Urban Water J.

Indexing
- CODEN: UWJRAU
- ISSN: 1573-062X (print); 1744-9006 (web)
- LCCN: 2006249042
- OCLC no.: 916329781

Links
- Journal homepage; Online access; Online archive

The Urban Water Journal is a peer-reviewed scientific journal covering topics related to water systems in the urban environment. It was established in 2004 and is published by Taylor & Francis in association with the International Association for Hydro-Environment Engineering and Research. The editors-in-chief are David Butler (University of Exeter), Alberto Campisano (University of Catania), Christos Makropoulos (National Technical University of Athens), and Čedo Maksimović (Imperial College London).

== Abstracting and indexing ==
The journal is abstracted and indexed in EBSCO databases, ProQuest databases, Science Citation Index Expanded, Scopus, Aquatic Sciences and Fisheries Abstracts, Inspec, Metadex, and GEOBASE. According to the Journal Citation Reports, the journal has a 2020 impact factor of 2.081.
