= Water Research =

- Discipline: Hydrology
- Language: English
- Edited by: Eberhard Morgenroth

Publication details
- History: 1967–present
- Publisher: Elsevier on behalf of the International Water Association
- Frequency: 20/year
- Open access: Hybrid
- Impact factor: 13.400 (2021)

Standard abbreviations
- ISO 4: Water Res.

Indexing
- CODEN: WATRAG
- ISSN: 0043-1354
- LCCN: 76006152
- OCLC no.: 644774080

Links
- Journal homepage; Online archive

Water Research is a peer-reviewed scientific journal covering research on the science and technology of water quality and its management. It was established in 1967 and is published by Elsevier on behalf of the International Water Association. The editor-in-chief is Eberhard Morgenroth (Swiss Federal Institute of Aquatic Science and Technology).

== Abstracting and indexing ==
The journal is abstracted and indexed in:

- Analytical Abstracts
- Aquatic Sciences and Fisheries Abstracts
- Biological Abstracts
- BIOSIS Previews
- CAB Abstracts
- Chemical Abstracts Service
- Current Contents/Agriculture, Biology & Environmental Sciences
- EBSCO databases
- Ei Compendex
- Embase
- Food Science and Technology Abstracts
- GEOBASE
- Index Medicus/MEDLINE/PubMed
- Metadex
- PASCAL
- ProQuest databases
- Science Citation Index Expanded
- Scopus

According to the Journal Citation Reports, the journal has a 2020 impact factor of 11.236.

== See also ==
- List of periodicals published by Elsevier
