= Marcos Von Sperling =

Brazilian researcher

- Education: Federal University of Minas Gerais; Imperial College London
- Known for: Writing some of the most influential textbooks for wastewater treatment in warm climate regions

Marcos Von Sperling is a Brazilian professor in Environmental Engineering at Federal University of Minas Gerais. He is known for writing some of the most influential textbooks for wastewater treatment in Brazil and other warm climate regions, known as "Biological wastewater treatment series". These books were later released under the Creative Commons license at IWA Water Wiki.

== Education ==
Von Sperling graduated from Federal University of Minas Gerais with a Civil Engineering degree in 1979. He received a master's degree in Sanitary Engineering from Federal University of Minas Gerais in 1983. He completed his PhD studies in Environmental Engineering at Imperial College London in 1990.

== Bibliography ==
- Volume 1: Wastewater Characteristics, Treatment and Disposal (2007)
- Volume 2: Basic Principles of Wastewater Treatment (2007)
- Volume 3: Waste Stabilisation Ponds (2007)
- Volume 4: Anaerobic Reactors (2007)
- Volume 5: Activated Sludge and Aerobic Biofilm Reactors (2007)
- Volume 6: Sludge Treatment and Disposal (2007)
