= International Water Association =

Nonprofit organization

International Water Association (IWA)
- Abbreviation: IWA
- Founded: 7 September 1999; 27 years ago
- Type: Professional association
- Purpose: Sustainable water management
- Headquarters: London (Note: As an international membership-based organization, IWA is legally incorporated in the United Kingdom as a company limited by guarantee and is also registered as a charity. Through a subsidiary or other related incorporated entity, IWA is also present and registered in other countries.), England
- Origins: IWSA, IAWQ
- Region served: Worldwide
- Method: Conferences, publications, forums, interest groups, task forces, specialist groups
- Members: 8,211 (2021)
- Key people: Hamanth Kasan (president); Kalanithy Vairavamoorthy (executive director)
- Website: iwa-network.org

The International Water Association (IWA) is a self-governing nonprofit organization and knowledge hub for the water sector, connecting water professionals and companies to find solutions to the world's water challenges. It has permanent staff housed in its headquarters and global secretariat in central London, England, to support the activities, and has a regional office in Chennai, India. The aim of the IWA is to function as an international network for water experts and promote standards and optimal approaches in sustainable water management. Its membership is a global mosaic comprising 313 technology companies, water and wastewater utilities, 54 universities, and wider stakeholders in the fields of water services, infrastructure engineering and consulting as well as 7,791 individuals including scientists and researchers, with 53 governing members (2021). IWA is an affiliated member of the International Science Council (ISC). IWA features regional associations, approximately 50 specialist groups covering key topics in urban water management, specialized task forces, and web-based knowledge networks.

Two significant conferences are organized by the IWA biennially: the World Water Congress & Exhibition (WWDE) and the Water and Development Congress & Exhibition (WDCE). IWA works across a wide range of issues covering the full water cycle, with four programmes – Basins of the Future (water security), Cities of the Future (urban metabolism, sustainable city), Water and Sanitation Services (wastewater management) including Water policy and regulation – that work towards achieving the Sustainable Development Goals adopted by the 70th UN General Assembly and addressing the threat to sustainable water posed by climate change.

== History ==
=== Merger of IWSA and IAWQ ===
The association traces its historical roots back to the International Water Supply Association (IWSA), established in June 1947 in Harrogate, United Kingdom, changing its name to International Water Service Association (IWSA) in the mid-1990s, and the International Association on Water Quality (IAWQ), which was originally formed as the International Association for Water Pollution Research (IAWPR) in 1962, formally constituted in June 1965 also in the same city, renamed International Association of Water Pollution Research and Control (IAWPRC) in March 1982 and adopting IAWQ in May 1992. Both were global membership organizations – one related to drinking water utility and the other related to wastewater utility – dedicated to advancing research and best practices through international collaboration, but represented two distinct causes, perspectives, histories, and membership profiles.

The organizations had a series of activities centered on recurring congresses, which in the later years would include specialty conferences and regional conferences for individuals without the means of attending the biennial events. The self-managed specialist group framework initially developed within IAWPRC would eventually evolve into the cornerstone of IWA's operational approach extending beyond IWA's biennial congresses, and be further enriched by clusters and programs formed by specialist groups within IWA. In the history of IWSA, the focus of publication of journals was smaller compared to IAWQ.

Discussions regarding a merger between the IWSA and IAWQ commenced in 1996. Given their shared location in London for several years, the idea of a merger had long been considered. Ultimately, negotiations for the merger were conducted through what later became known as the Merger Coordinating Group (MCG), who held a last meeting in London on 12-13 May 1999. On 23 January 1998, the then presidents, Nicholas Hood of IWSA and Thomas Keinath of IAWQ, signed a memorandum of understanding, paving the way for the ratification of the merger between the two organizations. After receiving mandates from their respective boards of directors to the formal proposal, IWSA in May and IAWQ in June the same year, the full merger was scheduled to take place by 1 August 1999. The merger was formally sealed during a signing event held at the Stockholm Water Week in August 1999. Under UK Charity Law, the merger officially dissolved IWSA and IAWQ, giving rise to the establishment of a new association.

The two professional, technical associations with separate cultures, and working methods eventually merged on 7 September 1999 to form the International Water Association (IWA), creating one international organization focused on the full water cycle. The merger was motivated by the streamlining of operations and a desire to accumulate critical mass. Legally signed and created at the end of July 1999, the IWA was ceremonially launched at the final IWSA 22nd World Water Congress and Exhibition, held in Buenos Aires, Argentina in 18–24 September 1999, in collaboration with AIDIS Argentina. IWA was operational in their new headquarters on Caxton Street, London, United Kingdom from January 2000. Included in the merger process was a new member leadership structure, the Scientific and Technical Council (STC) and a Management and Policy Council (MPC), and the creation of two subsidiaries: IWA Publishing (IWA) and the IWA Foundation.

=== Early years, new agendas and offices ===
The first congress under the auspices of the new organization was held in Paris in 2000 with nearly 2.500 delegates attending 450 oral presentations, 750 poster presentations and 4 workshops and seminars. In 2009, IWA launched a biennial Development Congress, with Mexico City as the inaugural location, as a key component of its comprehensive agenda to drive advancements in the developing world. Together with the America’s Clean Water Foundation (ACWF), IWA sponsored the first World Water Monitoring Day in October 2003, handled the joint coordination of the program together with the Water Environment Federation (WEF) from July 2006 until January 2015, where the coordinator role was transferred to EarthEcho International. By September 2016, the membership numbers at IWA had increased to 6,295 members, which was an increase from 4,901 members in 2007.

Water professionals had increasingly discussed and agreed on the necessity for a consistent framework within which to ensure drinking water quality standards, which was further emphasized by the World Health Organization's development of the 3rd edition of its Guidelines for Drinking Water Quality (GDWQ), emphasizing proactive risk-based management alongside end-product monitoring for compliance. A generic framework for water quality management was crafted during workshops in Bonn, Germany in October 2001 and refined in February 2004, resulting in the Bonn Charter for Safe Drinking Water, launched by IWA in September 2004 during the 4th WWC&E. The Bonn Charter for Safe Drinking Water advocates for the adoption of Water Safety Plans (WSPs), in alignment with the WHO GDWQ.

By 2015, the target year for the United Nations Millennium Development Goals (MDG) from 2009, the 2030 agenda of the UN Sustainable Development Goals (SDG) was embraced as a new main water-focused issue of concern among the many other global priorities. In March 2015, AquaRating was announced as the world's first rating agency for the water sector by establishing the international standard for assessing water and sanitation services provision, jointly developed by the Inter-American Development Bank (IADB) and the IWA. On 1 September 2016, the World Bank and IWA announced the establishment of a partnership surrounding the reduction of water losses. In a partnership with OPEC Fund for International Development (OFID), the IWA published a report on 26 February 2017, emphasizes the critical need for swift and substantial action to significantly enhance wastewater treatment, reuse, and recycling.

At an official ceremony on 14 November 2007, a major operational office in The Hague, the Netherlands, was opened, which followed the opening of regional offices in Beijing, Republic of China (7 December 2006) and Singapore (5 June 2007), and later in Nairobi, Kenya (2009/2010), Bucharest, Romania (24 November 2009) and Milwaukee, Wisconsin, United States (2016). A regional office in Chennai, India was established in May 2018 to coordinate the organization's activities across South Asia, and hosts a sub-unit of the IT and Digital Transformation team. A collaboration agreement that established IWA's new Global Operations Hub in Nanjing, Republic of China, was signed on 22 October 2018 to host the Asia & Oceania Regional Member Engagement and Service, Water Intelligence, IWA Learn, and Event, becoming fully operational in July 2019, and staying active until late 2022 or early 2023. Brexit let to the shutdown of the association's operations in the Netherlands and the transfer of activities back to the United Kingdom, where IWA and IWA Publishing has shared an expanded office in London since July 2020.

== Management ==
=== Presidents of IWA ===
All past presidents of the International Water Association are listed below. The length of the presidency is a two-year term of office, which can be renewed for a second mandate following a constitutional change at a Beijing meeting in 2006. The person becomes president-elect until the term officially commences at the conclusion of the opening ceremony of an upcoming World Water Congress & Exhibition event with the term ending at the close of the next WWC&E. The association's work and strategy is guided and directed by its Governing Assembly, Board of Directors, Strategic Council and committees. Votings for the position of IWA President (chairperson of the board) have occurred during a world congress or by the association’s Governing Assembly at the IWA annual general meeting. A vice president and a senior vice president is also elected as officers.

During the merger in 1999, two co-presidents, both hailing from South Africa, were elected at the Buenos Aires Congress. They were tasked with overseeing a two-year transition period from September 1999 through October 2001 (the IWA Congress in Berlin) as the newly formed organization, worked towards operational establishment. Diane D’Arras of France became the association's first female president in October 2016. Due to a delay caused by the COVID-19 pandemic, the presidency of Tom Mollenkopf became effective in May 2021 despite being elected for his first term in October 2019.

- 1999–2001 (Note: During the merger of IWSA and IAWQ in 1999, two co-presidents were tasked with overseeing a two-year transition period.): Piet Odendaal (South Africa)
- 1999–2001: Vincent Bath (South Africa)
- 2001–2003: Norihito Tambo (Japan)
- 2003–2004: Michael Rouse (United Kingdom)
- 2004–2006: Lászlo Somlyódy (Hungary)
- 2006–2010: David Garman (United States)
- 2010–2014: Glen Daigger (United States)
- 2014–2016: Helmut Kroiss (Austria)
- 2016–2021: Diane D’Arras (France)
- 2021–2024 (Note: Tom Mollenkopf was elected for his first term in Lisbon in October 2019, and scheduled to assumed his presidency in 2020, but did not take office until May 2021 due to a postponement caused by the COVID-19 pandemic mitigation measures.): Tom Mollenkopf (Australia)
- 2024–present: Hamanth Chotoo Kasan (South Africa)

=== Executive Directors of IWA ===
All past executive directors of the International Water Association are listed below. The IWA secretariat, where the association's worldwide operations are coordinated, is headed the by executive director, which is appointed by the board of directors. During the merger process of IWSA and IAWQ, Tony Milburn, who had previously served as the Executive Director of IAWQ since 1982, was appointed as the new Executive Director of IWA. Mike Slipper, who had served as the Executive Director of IWSA since 1997, was appointed as Deputy Executive Director of IWA.

- 1999–2002: Anthony Milburn (United Kingdom)
- 2002–2012: Paul Reiter (United States)
- 2012–2017 (Note: Paul Reiter stepped down as Executive Director on 8 December 2012. Ger Bergkamp took over as interim Executive Director until he was eventually appointed as the new Executive Director of IWA in April 2013.): Ger Bergkamp (Netherlands)
- 2017–present: Kala Vairavamoorthy (United Kingdom)

== Acknowledgement ==
IWA acknowledges the contributions and achievements of its members and professionals in the water sector through a program of honors and awards, which encompass the Global Water Award (since 2004), the Honorary Membership of the Association (since 2016), the Publishing Award (since 2002), the Gender & Diversity Award (known as the Women in Water Award in its former incarnation between 2008 and 2020), the Project Innovation Award (since 2016), the Professional Development Award (since 2018), the Best Practice on Resource Recovery (since 2015), the Young Leadership Award (since 1999), and the IWA/ISME Bio Cluster Award (in collaboration with the International Society for Microbial Ecology since 2016). Since 2015, a program aimed at encouraging the sustainable management of water in low- and middle-income countries has included the Water and Development Award for Research and the Water and Development Award for Practice, where the winners are announced during the opening plenary session of the WDC&E, held every two years.

=== IWA Global Water Award ===
Past awardees of the biennial award are listed below. Regarded as the highest honor from the IWA, and known as the IWA Grand Award between 2004 and 2008, the award is presented to the winner(s) at an upcoming World Water Congress & Exhibition. The IWA Global Water Award, bestowed by a review committee panelled by international experts spanning the water cycle, acknowledges any significant contributions of individuals towards enhancing global sustainable water and sanitation. Since the award's establishment, there have been dual winners on two occasions. The winner receives a trophy of various design and a certificate honoring their contributions.

- 2004: Jamie Bartram (Switzerland)
- 2004: Jisong Wu (Republic of China)
- 2006: Daniel A. Okun (United States)
- 2008: Jim Gill (Australia)
- 2008: Mark van Loosdrecht (Netherlands)
- 2010: David Jenkins (United Kingdom)
- 2010: Blanca Jiménez Cisneros (Mexico)
- 2012: R. Rhodes Trussell (United States)
- 2014: Qiu Baoxing (Republic of China)
- 2016: Catarina de Albuquerque (Portugal)
- 2018: Tony Wong (Australia)
- 2021 (Note: The IWA Global Water Award in 2021 was presented at the 2021 IWA Digital World Water Congress, instead of the postponed 2020 edition of the IWA World Water Congress & Exhibition.): Marcos Von Sperling (Brazil)
- 2022: Nisha Mandani (India)
- 2024: Joan Rose (United States)

== Publications ==
(T–B) Water21 was replaced by The Source as the membership magazine for the IWA in 2015.

IWA Publishing Ltd. (IWAP) was established as the wholly owned subsidiary of the International Water Association in January 1999, in anticipation of the merger between IAWQ and IWSA, with the purpose of providing information services on all aspects of water, wastewater and related environmental fields, and would take over journal, book and magazine publications from the previous associations. The company's portfolio include the publishing and printing of periodicals and a broad range of peer-reviewed scientific journals alongside over 800 books, research reports, manuals of best practice, and online services. The Journal Citation Reports lists Water Research with the highest impact factor of 11.236 (2020) among the company's journals.

A member and trade exhibition magazine, named Water21 was launched to coincide with the creation of IWA, publishing six issues each year with a worldwide circulation of approximately 20,000, and combining elements from the previous periodicals, IAWQ's Water Quality International and IWSA's Aqua News. The Water21 magazine's final issue was published in June 2015, when the magazine was rebranded and relaunched quarterly as The Source in September 2015. At one point a Chinese language supplement for the Water21 magazine, aimed at the Chinese water market, was published twice a year in a joint venture between IWA and Aquatech China with a circulation of 41,000. Two newsletters, named Water Utility Management International (WUMI) and Water Asset Management International (WAMI), were quarterly publications produced by the Water21 team between 2005/2006 and 2015. The first book published was Wastewater Treatment Systems in 1999.

In July 1999, the first new publication under IWA Publishing, Journal of Hydroinformatics, was launched in partnership with the International Association for Hydro-Environment Engineering and Research (IAHR), and later International Association of Hydrological Sciences (IAHS). From 2000, the publication of the three journals Water Science and Technology (previously published by Elsevier on behalf of IAWQ), AQUA and Water Supply (previously published by Blackwell Scientific Publications on behalf of IWSA) was continued by IWA Publishing, while the publication of Water Research journal, on behalf of IAWQ, was continued by Elsevier in association with IWA. Having had Elsevier as the publisher for the first four volumes, the official journal of the World Water Council, Water Policy, was transferred to IWA Publishing from 2003. Activities related to safe drinking-water by the World Health Organization (WHO) have since 2003 included a collaboration surrounding the publication of the Journal of Water and Health by IWA Publishing. In 2012, the publication of Water Quality Research Journal of Canada was passed from the Canadian Association on Water Quality (CAWQ) to IWA Publishing.

The first open access article was published in 2006 in the Journal of Water & Health and in 2016 the H2Open Journal became the first fully open access journal. Almost a quarter of all articles published in IWA Publishing journals in 2020 were open access. The publishing branch of IWA became a member of the Open Access Scholarly Publishing Association (OASPA) in 2021. Ten of IWA Publishing's journals became open access via a "Subscribe to Open" model (S2O) in 2021. In an agreement reached with Electronic Information for Libraries (EiFL), libraries continue to pay subscriptions and generate a revenue stream allowing the journals to be freely read and free to publish in by everybody.

Periodicals published by the IWA:

- AQUA: Water Infrastructure, Ecosystems and Society (Note: In January 2021, the IWA Publishing team relaunched the Journal of Water Supply: Research and Technology-Aqua, which became AQUA: Water Infrastructure, Ecosystems and Society.) (fi. June 1952)
- Blue–Green Systems (fi. January 2019)
- H_{2}Open Journal (Note: The IWA launched IWA Open Water Journal on 10 October 2016 at the IWA World Water Congress and Exhibition 2016. After being renamed H_{2}Open Journal, the first issue was published in July 2018.) (fi. July 2018)
- Hydrology Research (Note: The journal was first published by the Nordic Association of Hydrology in February 1970 as Nordic Hydrology Journal and remained under this title until August 2007 (volume 38, issue 4–5). From 2008, the scientific journal was adopted by the British Hydrological Society under the new title Hydrology Research.) (fi. February 1970)
- Journal of Hydroinformatics (fi. July 1999)
- Journal of Water & Climate Change (fi. March 2010)
- Journal of Water & Health (fi. March 2003)
- Water Reuse (Note: The Journal of Water Reuse and Desalination was launched in March 2011. In January 2021, the IWA Publishing team relaunched the title as Water Reuse, with its first issue published in March.) (fi. March 2011)
- Journal of Water, Sanitation & Hygiene for Development (fi. March 2011)
- Water Policy (Note: The official journal of the World Water Council (WWC).) (fi. February 1998)
- Water Practice & Technology (fi. March 2006)
- Water Quality Research Journal (Note: The journal's first issue was launched on 1 February 1966 and has been known by its current name since volume 52, issue 1. Former names include Proceedings - Canadian symposium on water pollution research from the first issue in 1966, Proceedings. Annual Symposium on Water Pollution Research, Water Pollution Research in Canada until 1979, Water Pollution Research Journal of Canada between 1980 and 1994, and underwent a name change most recently in 2017 from Water Quality Research Journal of Canada (between 1995 and 2016).) (fi. February 1966)
- Water Science & Technology (Note: The journal Progress in Water Technology was launched in 1972 as a new series by publisher Pergamon Press on behalf of the International Association on Water Pollution Research (IAWPR), and renamed Water Science and Technology in 1981. Volume 1 in the series was Applications of New Concepts of Physical-Chemical Wastewater Treatment (Nashville Conference; 1972), volume 2 was Phosphorus in Fresh Water and the Marine Environment (London Conference; 1973), volume 3 was Management and Pollution Control Problems (Jerusalem Workshop Papers; 1973), while volume 4 was Toward a Unified Concept of Biological Waste Treat ment (Atlanta City Conference; 1973).) (fi. 1972)
- Water Supply (Note: The journal was formerly published by the International Water Services Association (IWSA) as Water Supply. From 2000, the journal was brought under the Water Science and Technology umbrella as an adjunct. From volume 1, issue 1 in 2000, the magazine was called Water Science & Technology: Water Supply. From volume 19, issue 1, the magazine was renamed Water Supply.) (fi. January 2001)

Published by Elsevier on behalf of the IWA:

- Water Research (fi. January 1967)
- Water Research X (fi. December 2018)
- Water Resources and Economics (fi. January 2013)
- Water Resources and Industry (fi. March–June 2013)
- Water Resources & Rural Development (fi. November 2013; li. December 2017)
- Sustainability of Water Quality and Ecology (fi. December 2013; li. November 2017)

Published in association with Universitat Politècnica de València:

- Ingeneria del Agua (Note: The journal Ingeniería del agua is written in Spanish.) (fi. January 1994)

IWA membership magazine:

- Water21 (fi. July 1999; li. June 2015)
- The Source (fi. September 2015)

IWA newsletters:

- Water Asset Management International (fi. March 2006; li. December 2015)
- Water Utility Management International (fi. March 2005; li. December 2015)

== Conferences and workshops ==
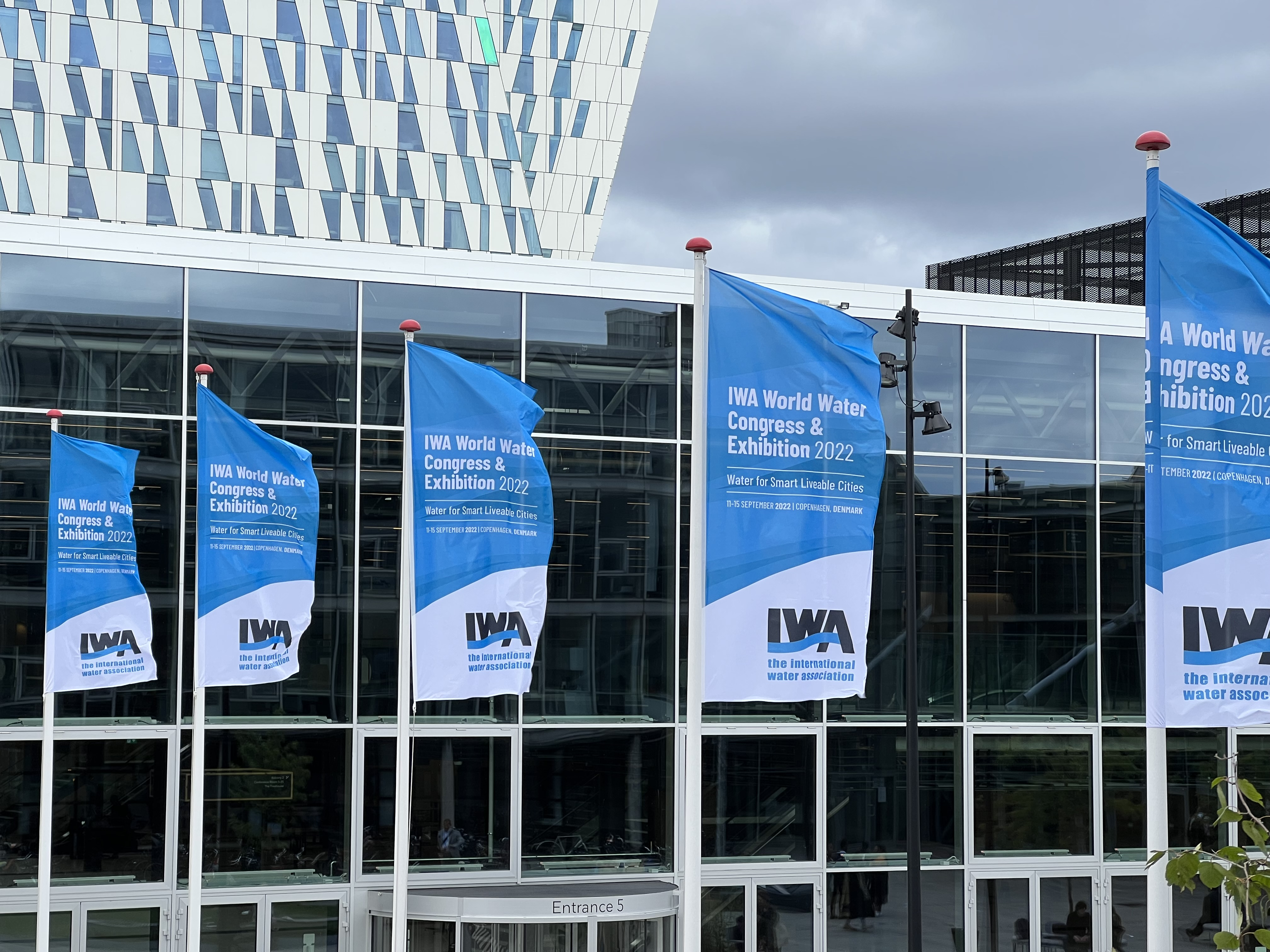
Flags at the entrance to the IWA World Water Congress & Exhibition, September 2022, at the Bella Center Copenhagen.

IWA annually hosts approximately 40 specialist conferences and workshops on various aspects of water management. Flagship events organized by the IWA include the World Water Congress & Exhibition (WWCE) since 2000 and the biennial Water and Development Congress & Exhibition, with its first edition held in 2009. The Conference for Water Safety, previously held in Lisbon (2008), Kuching (2010), Kampala (2012), Palawan (2016), Narvik (2022) and Montevideo (2024), and involving the discussion and implementation of Water Safety Plans (WSPs), is organized by the IWA and for the first five editions it was co-sponsored by the World Health Organization (WHO). The Leading Edge Conference on Water and Wastewater Technologies (LET) has been held annually since the first edition at Noordwijk, the Netherlands in 2003, with the exception of years 2020–2021. The Design, Operation and Economics of Large Wastewater Treatment Plants (LWWTP) conferences represent the longest-standing specialized conferences organized by an IWA specialist group (SG), the LWWTP group, which persisted through IAWQ's merger with IWSA into IWA and initially organized the first conference as a workshop in 1971 in Vienna, Austria.

The first World Water Congress held under the auspices of the IWA was technically organized under IAWQ congress traditions, while the second WWC was organized as an IWSA/DVGW styled congress. The program committee created for the third congress, held together with the Enviro 2002 Convention & Exhibition, designed the technical program, and was subsequently used as a standing committee for future congresses to ensure both quality and continuity. The 6th edition of the World Water Congress & Exhibition was visited by 4,500 participants from 94 different countries, which by the 11th edition in Tokyo had increased to 9,815 participants from 98 countries, while 8,900 water professionals from utilities, academia, private companies, governments, and global organizations, of 102 countries, took part in the 12th edition in Copenhagen. Due to the COVID-19 pandemic in Europe imposing major limitations on travel, the 12th edition of WWC&E was moved to 2022. As a replacement, between 24 May and 4 June 2021 an online event known as 2021 IWA Digital World Water Congress was held, providing an opportunity for presenting papers originally prepared for WWC&E 2020 accompanied by plenary sessions, over 100 presentations and live Q&A sessions.

The 1st edition of the Water & Development Congress & Exhibition was visited by 400 delegates from 60 countries, organized by the IWA and National Autonomous University of Mexico, while the 6th edition saw 3,142 participants attend from over 100 countries. The 5th IWA Water and Development Congress & Exhibition was not held at a conference center or university, but took place in buildings and under temporary tents at a water treatment plant in Buenos Aires, Argentina.

=== WWCE locations and dates ===
Edition	Name	Dates	Venue	Refs
1	1st IWA World Water Congress	3–7 July 2000	Palais des congrès de Paris, Paris, France	
2	2nd IWA World Water Congress	15–19 October 2001	Internationales Congress Centrum Berlin, Berlin, Germany	
3	3rd IWA World Water Congress	7–12 April 2002	Melbourne Convention Centre, Melbourne, Australia	
4	4th IWA World Water Congress & Exhibition	19–24 September 2004	Palais des congrès de Marrakech, Marrakesh, Morocco	
5	2006 IWA World Water Congress & Exhibition	10–14 September 2006	Beijing International Convention Center, Beijing, China	
6	2008 IWA World Water Congress & Exhibition	7–12 September 2008	Austria Center Vienna, Vienna, Austria	
7	2010 IWA World Water Congress & Exhibition	19–23 September 2010	Palais des congrès de Montréal, Montreal, Canada	
8	2012 IWA World Water Congress & Exhibition	16–21 September 2012	Busan Exhibition and Convention Center, Busan, South Korea	
9	2014 IWA World Water Congress & Exhibition	21–26 September 2014	Centro de Congressos de Lisboa, Lisbon, Portugal	
10	2016 IWA World Water Congress & Exhibition	9–14 October 2016	Brisbane Convention & Exhibition Centre, Brisbane, Australia	
11	2018 IWA World Water Congress & Exhibition	16–21 September 2018	Tokyo Big Sight, Tokyo, Japan	
12	2022 IWA World Water Congress & Exhibition	11–15 September 2022	Bella Center Copenhagen, Copenhagen, Denmark	
13	2024 IWA World Water Congress & Exhibition	11–15 August 2024	Metro Toronto Convention Centre, Toronto, Canada	
14	2026 IWA World Water Congress & Exhibition	2026	Glasgow, United Kingdom	
15	2028 IWA World Water Congress & Exhibition	2028	Kuching, Malaysia	
16	2030 IWA World Water Congress & Exhibition	2030	São Paulo, Brazil	

=== WDCE locations and dates ===
Edition	Name	Dates	Venue	Refs
1	1st IWA Development Congress	15–19 November 2009 (Note: The 1st IWA Development Congress was originally scheduled to be held 6–10 September 2009.)	National Autonomous University of Mexico, Mexico City, Mexico	
2	2nd IWA Development Congress & Exhibition	21–24 November 2011	Kuala Lumpur Convention Centre, Kuala Lumpur, Malaysia	
3	3rd IWA Development Congress & Exhibition	14–17 October 2013	Kenyatta International Conference Centre, Nairobi, Kenya	
4	2015 IWA Water and Development Congress & Exhibition	18–22 October 2015	King Hussein Bin Talal Convention Centre, Dead Sea area, Jordan	
5	2017 IWA Water and Development Congress & Exhibition	13–16 November 2017	AySA Water Treatment Plant, General San Martín, Buenos Aires, Argentina	
6	2019 IWA Water and Development Congress & Exhibition	1–5 December 2019	Bandaranaike Memorial International Conference Hall, Colombo, Sri Lanka	
7	2023 IWA Water and Development Congress & Exhibition	10–14 December 2023	Kigali Convention Centre, Kigali, Rwanda	
8	2025 IWA Water and Development Congress & Exhibition	8–12 December 2025	Queen Sirikit National Convention Center, Bangkok, Thailand	
