= Water Science and Technology =

- Discipline: Hydrology, water resources
- Language: English
- Edited by: Wolfgang Rauch

Publication details
- History: 1969–present
- Publisher: IWA Publishing
- Frequency: Monthly
- Open access: Yes
- License: CC-BY-NC-ND
- Impact factor: 2.430 (2021)

Standard abbreviations
- ISO 4: Water Sci. Technol.

Indexing
- CODEN: WSTED4
- ISSN: 0273-1223 (print); 1996-9732 (web)
- LCCN: 82645900
- OCLC no.: 7004034

Links
- Journal homepage; Online archive

Water Science and Technology is a monthly peer-reviewed scientific journal covering all aspects of the management of water quality. It was established in 1969 and is published by IWA Publishing. The editor-in-chief is Wolfgang Rauch (University of Innsbruck).

== Abstracting and indexing ==
The journal is abstracted and indexed in the Science Citation Index Expanded, Current Contents/Agriculture, Biology & Environmental Sciences, Current Contents/Engineering, Computing & Technology, BIOSIS Previews, Elsevier Biobase, and Scopus.
