= Population equivalent =

Equivalent population to produce industrial wastewater

Population equivalent (PE) or unit per capita loading, or equivalent person (EP), is a parameter for characterizing industrial wastewaters. It essentially compares the polluting potential of an industry (in terms of biodegradable organic matter) with a population (or certain number of people), which would produce the same polluting load. In other words, it is the number expressing the ratio of the sum of the pollution load produced during 24 hours by industrial facilities and services to the individual pollution load in household sewage produced by one person in the same time. This refers to the amount of oxygen-demanding substances in wastewater which will consume oxygen as it bio-degrades, usually as a result of bacterial activity.

== Equation and base value ==
A value frequently used in the international literature for PE, which was based on a German publication, is 54 grams of BOD (Biochemical oxygen demand) per person (or per capita or per inhabitant) per day. This has been adopted by many countries for design purposes but other values are also in use. For example, a commonly used definition used in Europe is: 1 PE equates to 60 grams of BOD per person per day, and it also equals 200 liters of sewage per day. In the United States, a figure of 80 grams BOD per day is normally used.

If the base value is taken as 60 grams of BOD per person per day, then the equation to calculate PE from an industrial wastewater is:

$$PE =\dfrac{BOD\ load\  from\ industry\ \left [\dfrac{kg}{day}\right ]}{0.060\ \left [\dfrac{kg}{inhab \cdot day}\right ]}$$

== Population equivalents for industrial wastewaters ==
BOD population equivalents of wastewater from some industries
Type	Activity	Unit of production	BOD PE [inhab/(unit/d)]
Food	Canning (fruit/vegetables)	1 ton processed	500
	Pea processing	1 ton processed	85-400
	Tomato	1 ton processed	50-185
	Carrot	1 ton processed	160-390
	Potato	1 ton processed	215-545
	Citrus fruit	1 ton processed	55
	Chicken meat	1 ton processed	70-1600
	Beef	1 ton processed	20-600
	Fish	1 ton processed	300-2300
	Sweets/candies	1 ton produced	40-150
	Sugar cane	1 ton produced	50
	Dairy (without cheese)	1000 L milk	20-100
	Dairy (with cheese)	1000 L milk	100-800
	Margarine	1 ton produced	500
	Slaughter house	1 cow / 2.5 pigs	10-100
	Yeast production	1 ton produced	21000
Confined animals breeding	Pigs	live t.d	35-100
	Dairy cattle (milking room)	live t.d	1-2
	Cattle	live t.d	65-150
	Horses	live t.d	65-150
	Poultry	live t.d	15-20
Sugar-alcohol	Alcohol distillation	1 ton cane processed	4000
Drinks	Brewery	1 m3 produced	150-350
	Soft drinks	1 m3 produced	50-100
	Wine	1 m3 produced	5
Textiles	Cotton	1 ton produced	2800
	Wool	1 ton produced	5600
	Rayon	1 ton produced	550
	Nylon	1 ton produced	800
	Polyester	1 ton produced	3700
	Wool washing	1 ton produced	2000-4500
	Dyeing	1 ton produced	2000-3500
	Textile bleaching	1 ton produced	250-350
Leather and tanneries	Tanning	1 ton hide processed	1000-3500
	Shoes	1000 pairs produced	300
Pulp and paper	Pulp	1 ton produced	600
	Paper	1 ton produced	100-300
	Pulp and paper integrated	1 ton produced	1000-10000
Chemical industrial	Paint	1 employee	20
	Soap	1 ton produced	1000
	Petroleum refinery	1 barrel (117 L)	1
	PVC	1 ton produced	200
Steelworks	Foundry	1 ton pig iron produced	12-30
	Lamination	1 ton produced	8-50

== See also ==
- Sewage treatment
