= Drug expiration =

Date after which a drug may not be suitable for use

Drug expiration is the date after which a drug might not be suitable for use as manufactured. Consumers can determine the shelf life for a drug by checking its pharmaceutical packaging for an expiration date.

Drugs which are past their shelf life can decompose and either be ineffective or even harmful. Standard advice from drug manufacturers and some health organizations is to dispose of drugs after the expiration date printed on the packaging. However, the published expiration date is not an absolute indication that a drug has spoiled. Consumers and organizations sometimes use expired drugs for medical treatment either as a cost saving measure or because they otherwise cannot access drugs which are not expired. Medical authorities find it difficult to discuss when consumers can safely use drugs after the printed expiration date because it is difficult to obtain clear information.

== Labeled expiration date versus true expiration ==
Manufacturers print expiration dates on drug bottle labels. The labeled expiration date is a manufacturer's promise for a time until which the drug will have full efficacy and be safe as manufactured. The labeled expiration date is not an indication of when a drug has become ineffective or unsafe to use. Many drugs are effective for years after their expiration dates. However, it is difficult for anyone including researchers and physicians to find information to verify how much any given drug will degrade in efficacy or become unsafe over time. Drug manufacturers never support the use of drugs after the expiration date because that could make them liable if something went wrong.

The expiration date printed on drug packaging will differ from the date when the drug will become ineffective. Before the true expiration of a drug, its active ingredient will retain its potency. Also before expiration, no components of the drug will degrade to become harmful. Since products continually change over time, the characteristics of any drug are not unchanging but instead estimated with assay measurements to be within the specification required by the government regulator where the drug is sold. As a general estimate, a drug is deemed to be unfit for use when 10% of the active ingredient is degraded.

Before choosing an expiration date to print the manufacturer must decide a true expiration date. After a manufacturer has decided what true expiration date it has set, then it will decide another date to make public and advertise on the packaging of the drug. The printed expiration date will always be sooner than the true expiration date, because the drug should always be effective and safe before the labeled expiration date if kept properly.

== Options for expired drugs ==
=== Disposal ===
The United States' Center for Drug Evaluation and Research officially recommends that drugs past their expiration date be disposed. It has been argued that this practice is wasteful, since consumers and medical facilities are encouraged to purchase fresh medication to replace their expired products, also resulting in additional profits for pharmaceutical firms.

=== Consumer use as normal ===
Some consumers can face the difficult position of being unable to afford their medication, and choosing between using expired medication or forgoing medication. An epipen is an example of an expensive medication which someone might consider using after expiration because of inability to purchase newer medication. Some common drugs which authorities say are always unsafe if expired include nitroglycerin, insulin, and liquid antibiotics.

Consumers sometimes store drugs which they ought not use, regardless of being expired. People who have leftover antibiotics might feel that they can use them safely if they are not expired, or even if they are expired. Medical authorities recommend that no one use prescription drugs except under a physician's care. Authorities also encourage care in storing over-the-counter drugs, discarding them on a regular schedule, and using them as directed when appropriate.

=== Drug recycling and reuse ===
Drug recycling is a relatively new concept, but in some places it happens. Sometimes, an individual or organization will have valuable medicine which they do not intend to use. If that medication could be used by other people before its expiration, then sometimes, interested parties discuss drug recycling to transfer ownership of the drugs away from the party which will not use them to the party which needs them. In such discussions, anyone considering the transfer of drugs will also consider if drugs could be used before their expiration.

In the United States, there is a growing movement for medication reclamation and reuse, particularly for high-cost specialty drugs such as oral chemotherapies. This practice is increasingly viewed as an opportunity to reduce pharmaceutical waste and help patients who cannot afford necessary medications.

In the U.S., programs for drug reclamation and donation are regulated on a state-by-state basis, with some states allowing the donation and/or dispensing of approved unused prescriptions. Tennessee law, for example, permits programs based in the state to accept donations of approved unused prescriptions from individuals and clinics from anywhere in the United States. It also allows dispensing of approved donated medications to patients in need. Dispensing donated medications is currently allowed, in various forms, in 42 U.S. states.

== Shelf Life Extension Program ==
To reduce the cost to the military of maintaining stockpiles of certain pharmaceuticals, the United States Department of Defense (DoD) and the Food and Drug Administration (FDA) operate a joint initiative known as the Shelf Life Protection Program (SLEP), which evaluates the long-term effectiveness of medications stockpiled by the DoD and other government agencies. Under the program, medications are tested for safety and stability for extended periods of time in controlled storage conditions. In many cases, medications tested were found to be effective for years past their printed expiry dates; a 2006 study by the Journal of Pharmaceutical Sciences found that two-thirds of 122 medications tested through SLEP remained effective for an average of at least four additional years. In 2016, the DoD reported that the program had helped save the department US$2.1 billion on replacing stockpiled medications.

While testing and stability assessment found that 88% of the lots were effective at least one year after their expiration date, with an average extension of 66 months, the additional stability period was very variable. For antibiotics studied, the mean extension for ciprofloxacin was 55 months, and for amoxicillin 23 months.
