= ISDE =

ISDE may stand for:

- Institute for Space and Defense Electronics, a research facility at Vanderbilt University
- International Six Days Enduro, an international off-road motorcycle competition
- International Society of Doctors for the Environment, an environmental organization
