= Unused drug =

Medicine remaining after the consumer has quit using it

An unused drug or leftover drug is the medicine which remains after the consumer has quit using it. Individual patients may have leftover medicines at the end of their treatment. Health care organizations may keep larger amounts of drugs as part of providing care to a community, and may have unused drugs for a range of reasons. The unused drugs should be destroyed utterly to eliminate the toxic effects of undisposed drugs on flora and fauna. The improper disposal of unused drugs could be the reason for the contamination of Surface, Ground and Drinking Water. Discharge of unused antibiotics and disinfectants in the sewage system may ruin the aquatic life or contamination of drinking water.

The determination of appropriate ways for disposal of unused medications can predict the number of contamination problems of the environment. There are several studies which evidence the toxic effects of medications on the environment which are disposed of inappropriately.

== Causes ==
Various circumstances may cause a consumer to have unused drugs. The consumer might find that their medication is ineffective and quit taking it. The medicine might be effective, but the consumer might not adhere to their treatment and fail to take it for any reason. A patient might die, leaving their medications behind. A patient might move, such as from a hospital to their home, and leave their unused drugs behind with the health care provider.

Some medical professional practices lead to patients having unused drugs. Physicians may prescribe more than they should. Physicians and patients might see each other less often than they should, and the physician might agree to prescribe medication for a longer period of time than is best. The physician might neglect to review what medications a patient already has, and recommend more. The medical office might have confused records about what drugs a patient has, especially for offices without full computer records. Also a physician might provide drugs inappropriately in unnecessary health care.

== Scope of the issue ==
Many consumers store unused drugs. Many health care organizations come to acquire large amounts of unused drugs. The volunteer for health centres must know the importance of proper drug disposal systems. The EPA and the FDA want unwanted or expired drugs disposed of completely.

== Responses ==
Consumer organizations recommend that individuals be thoughtful about their unused drugs. Storing unused drugs at home can be a safety hazard. Drug disposal is often the right choice for consumers. Some regions offer government or nonprofit programs for the collection of unused drugs.

Governments and organizations can have larger stockpiles of drugs than any consumer and a different set of concerns. World-leading organizations such as WHO and UNICEF recommended several appropriate and safe drug disposal options and drug use prevention. With large supplies of drugs, drug pollution and negative environmental impact of pharmaceuticals and personal care products becomes a concern. Also, drug recycling might be a possibility.

== Collection ==
Collection of unused drugs, also called drug return or drug take-back, is any program for individual consumers to dispose of drugs by returning their unused drugs to a collection center. One survey of consumers found that individuals like the idea of pharmacies accepting drug returns.

Drug return programs can reduce the environmental impact of pharmaceuticals and personal care products.

Various research projects have investigated drug return programs at pharmacies in particular regions. Studied places include the United States, Britain, France, Switzerland, Sweden, Serbia, and Germany.

== Leftover opioids ==
People in the United States tend to store unused opioids if any remain unused after medical treatment. Keeping unused opioids can be particularly dangerous because of substantial risk of their being misused.
