= Drug disposal =

Safe disposal of unused drugs

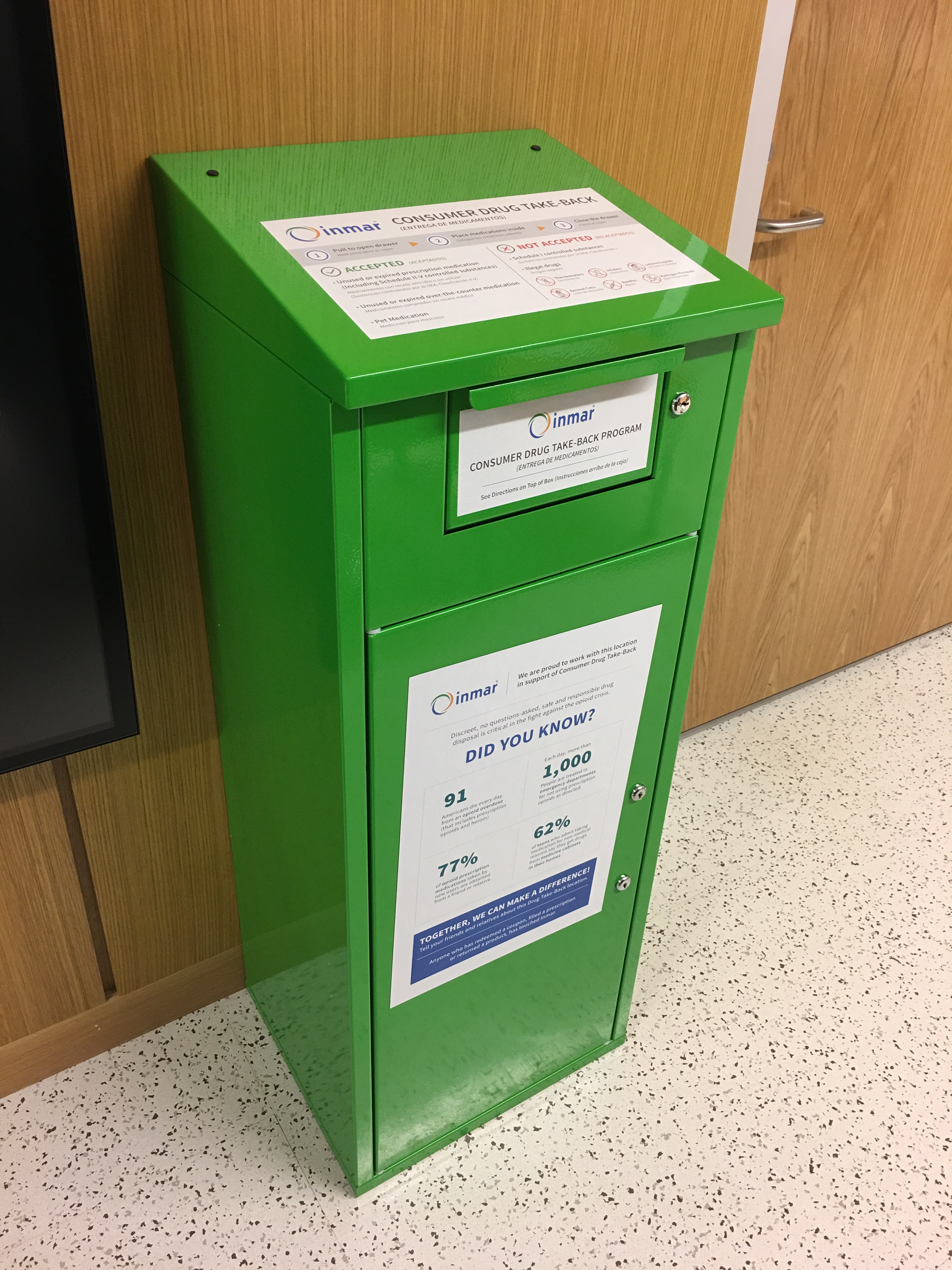
This is a drug disposal receptacle in the lobby of a hospital.

Drug disposal is the discarding of drugs. Individuals commonly dispose of unused drugs that remain after the end of medical treatment. Health care organizations dispose of drugs on a larger scale for a range of reasons, including having leftover drugs after treating patients and discarding of expired drugs. Failure to properly dispose of drugs creates opportunities for others (of whom the drug is unintended) to take them inappropriately. Inappropriate disposal of drugs can also cause drug pollution.

People dispose of drugs in various ways; even organizations with expertise on drugs may give inconsistent information to consumers about drug disposal. Proper waste management system including distribution, control, and disposal not only helps the Healthcare Centres but also promote environmental health.

== Sources of drugs ==
Medication waste includes both hazardous and non-hazardous waste, controlled substances, and expired pharmaceuticals.

Medication waste can come from multiple levels in the drug's lifespan. First, it can come from production factories from where they were created. This includes unwanted pharmaceutical ingredients and materials that can no longer be used in the drug manufacturing process. Second, medication waste can be generated from healthcare facilities including hospitals, clinics, and pharmacies. Medication waste from this source can be from over prescribing of drugs from healthcare providers, hospital labs, expired drugs, opened drug containers and partially used medications. Furthermore, these wastes can include materials, such as syringes, vials, IV bags, and tubing that contain excess drugs or contaminated in the process of handling hazardous pharmaceuticals, such as chemotherapy drugs. Some states have regulations that require healthcare facilities to destroy unused medications. Lastly, pharmaceutical waste can come from excessive consumption of over-the-counter medications from patients.

Sometimes normal use of a drug can result in waste. For example, when someone uses a dermal patch, after the patch is used, it will still retain significant potency, necessitating safe disposal.

== Reasons for disposal of drugs ==
Medical authorities advise that consumers not store any drug that they would not have a reason at present to possess. Storing drugs creates a possibility that someone will use them inappropriately and suffer harm. Accidental ingestion of medications prescribed for another individual is a leading source of poisonings in American households. According to Poison Control Centers in the United States, in 2007 approximately 23,783 of 255,732 cases involving inappropriate medication use were associated with inadvertent exposure. 5,000 of these cases involved children under the age of 6 years old. Due to the variations in the way children's bodies metabolize drugs, medication poisoning in children can be extremely fatal.

== Methods for disposal ==
=== Disposal for individuals and communities ===
The most obvious way for individuals to dispose of drugs is through the household waste management service. Experts advise checking other options first because simply discarding drugs with other trash creates the possibility that someone could use them and be harmed. Medical authorities recommend against disposing of drugs by passing them on to other consumers.

The best source of local advice will be the community pharmacy. Pharmacies already handle drugs and will recommend what sort of disposal method is most appropriate. Many pharmacies will collect drugs and dispose of them as a community service. Some regions have special government services that offer to take back and dispose of drugs. Sometimes, either a pharmacy or government service will provide a way to mail drugs to a special drug disposal facility. If there are no other options and one must put drugs into the trash, a recommended safer way to do so is by mixing the drug with unattractive trash. Putting pills into the toilet can cause drug pollution, but this might be justified as a way to quickly dispose of dangerous drugs.

There have been many attempts in the United States to encourage consumers to bring their leftover drugs to disposal centers. Some examples of disposal programs include having a special event at a community center with prior advertisements for people to bring their drugs to the event, or otherwise educating individuals and concerned organizations about the correct way to dispose of drugs. One study reviewing the efficacy of these programs found that their impact was too low to have the desired result of decreasing community access to leftover drugs.

=== Disposal for organizations and industry ===
Disposal of large amounts of drugs can cause drug pollution and negatively impact the environment. Organizations might choose to dispose of large amounts of drugs by returning them to the manufacturer, putting them in landfills, using Incineration, or dumping the drugs into sewers.

== Disposal of controversial drugs ==
Drugs associated with substance abuse and prohibited drugs receive special attention in their disposal. The police might seize such drugs as contraband, and then have to destroy them. In other cases, some legal drugs create risks for abuse and need more attention in disposal than drugs that are not attractive for abuse. It is challenging for governments to discuss how to properly dispose of controversial drugs.

One small regional study in the United States reported the outcomes of a public health program to take back unused opioids. This study found that individuals who returned opioids tended to return more than half of what they were prescribed, which could be an indication that these people had twice as much medication as they wanted. The study was too limited to form a general conclusion, but it provided information to guide further discussion and research on whether people would participate in opioid take-back programs, what sorts of drugs are more likely to be returned, and how much people would return.

There is a list of medications in which the U.S. Food and Drug Administration recommends to be disposed of via flushing down the toilet if consumers are unable to take these drugs to a drug take-back program. These medications contain controlled substances that are dangerous to pets and other people in the home and should be disposed of immediately when no longer needed. Examples include Dilaudid (hydromorphone hydrochloride) tablets, fentanyl patches and morphine sulfate oral solution. In 2016, a Harvard University study found unsafe levels of poly-fluoroalkyl and perfluoroalkyl substances (PFASs) (industrial chemicals associated with cancer, hormone malfunction, and several health problems) in the drinking water of 6 million Americans. These products should immediately flush due to high potential for abuse and overdose.

== Worldwide drug disposal practices ==
=== European Union ===
In 2001, the European Parliament released a Directive regarding the disposal practices of medicinal products. Directive 2001/83/EC stated that the outer packaging of medications needed to include special disposal precautions. In 2004, the EU put out another directive that further clarified the 2001 directive and called for establishment of medication collection protocols and information regarding specific collection protocols for the state or country be placed on the packaging.

=== United Kingdom ===
As outlined in National Health Service SI 2014/349: The National Health Service (Pharmaceutical and Local Pharmaceutical Services) Regulations 2013, local pharmacies are obligated to take back unused and unwanted medications generated in the home. Per these same regulations, pharmacies are responsible for sorting the medications and returning them to the NHS.

=== Canada ===
Canada has no specific nationwide drug take back or disposal policy, but most provinces have individual plans. Most pharmacies in Canada can take back unused and expired medications any day of the year.

=== Australia ===
According to the Return Unwanted Medicines (RUM) project in Australia, many of the medicines can be placed directly in the disposal bins except for opioids which must be stored separately. The pharmacist must be known as sorting material of medications for appropriate disposal.

=== Asian Regions ===
Unused or Expired medications are stored in the households and disposed of in the trash or flushed into the toilets among the Asian countries such as Malaysia, Bangladesh, Thailand.

== National Regulations in the United States ==
In the United States, used prescriptions are serious safety concerns because they can be accidentally ingested, overdosed or diverted for illegal use.

To address these concerns, the Drug Enforcement Administration (DEA) created the National Take Back Initiative. Drug Take-Back Days occur twice annually in April and October. The take-back events are part of a mission to create safe medication disposal sites, prevent drug diversion or transfer of the prescribed drug for illicit use, and provide education for the public. In April 2021, the program reported the collection of 420 short tons (380,000 kg) of drugs at 5,060 sites around the country. Additionally, The National Association of Drug Diversion Investigators (NADDI) sponsors a website to locate Rx Drug Drop Boxes for safe medication disposal outside of National Prescription Drug Take-Back Days.

=== Secure and Responsible Drug Disposal Act of 2010 ===
Congress approved an amendment to the Controlled Substances Act in 2010. The law provides the DEA with the option to develop a permanent process for people to safely and conveniently dispose of their prescription drugs. President Barack Obama signed the Secure and Responsible Drug Disposal Act of 2010, and the DEA immediately began installing regulations for a more permanent solution. The law prohibits the disposal of controlled substances unless a member of law enforcement has authorization from the DEA to directly receive and dispose of the controlled substance. This bars drug take-back programs from being able to receive and dispose of controlled medications for members of the public, which in turn can lead to the potential misuse of these drugs. Misuse of prescription medications has been a growing epidemic, with deaths from opioids quadrupling since 1999. It was shown that in 2006, about 1/3 of new prescription drug abusers were 12-17-year-olds. With these statistics, Congress decided to take an active role in trying to make drug take-back programs more readily available. Therefore, the "Secure and Responsible Drug Disposal Act of 2010" was created to allow the Attorney General permission in creating new policies to provide citizens "convenient and safe" disposal of their unwanted medications to authorized people or facilities. Congress created this act with a goal of preventing drug diversion and environmental harm/pollution by these drugs.

=== Other Take Back Programs ===
In addition to the drug disposal of 2012, other national agencies have also promoted the use of the drug take-back programs. In 2011, White House announced the first national Prescription Abuse Prevention Plan. The Prescription Abuse Prevention Plan expanded support to the prescription drug disposal programs and decreased the supply of unused prescription drugs. The U.S. Environmental Protection Agency (EPA) also encouraged the use of prescription drug disposal programs with guidelines for household disposal of medication and recommendations on the incineration of the household pharmaceutical product. The American Pharmacist Association and Pharmaceutical Research and Manufacturers of America also partnered with the U.S. Fish and Wildlife Service to raise awareness for consumers to properly dispose of medication. The campaign encouraged consumers to not flush unused medications or pour them down the sink. The campaign also recognized pharmacists' role to inform consumers of the different disposal techniques and which medications are appropriate for flushing.

== Examples of State Regulations ==
=== Alameda County Safe Drug Disposal Ordinance ===
Alameda County was the first county in the United States to make the manufacturer pay for safe disposal of pharmaceutical waste. This ordinance required companies that manufacture drugs sold and distributed in Alameda County must operate and pay for a "Product Stewardship Program." Examples of these programs include a drug kiosk or mail-back program and volunteer collectors, such as law enforcement and pharmacies. Due to this program 8 other counties in California adopted similar programs, including San Mateo, Santa Barbara, Santa Clara, Marin, Los Angeles, Santa Cruz, Sonoma, Contra Costa, San Luis Obispo, and Tehama Counties.

=== California State Board of Pharmacy ===
In California, entities including pharmacies in retail and hospital settings may host drug take-back programs as long as they follow requirements under Article 9.1 of Division 17 of Title 16 of the California Code of Regulations. These pharmacies are required to register with the Drug Enforcement Administration (DEA) and notify the Board of Pharmacy and DEA within 30 days of starting or stopping a program. These pharmacies must have collection receptacles located in authorized locations and have liners that are certified to meet American Society for Testing Materials standards. The pharmacies must also follow protocols like accepting prescription drugs to be sent back to an authorized DEA destruction site and no employee can be part of the program if they have a history with controlled substance-related felonies. The pharmacy may not sort, count, or review the unwanted prescription medications once collected and they are required to report tampering of any receptacles to the Board of Pharmacy within 14 days. These pharmaceutical take-back programs only take prescription medications, not drug samples or medical waste.

=== California Senate Bill 212 ===
On September 30, 2018, California passed SB 212: Solid waste: pharmaceutical and sharps waste stewardship. Similar to the Alameda County Ordinance, this is a statewide drug and needle program funded by manufacturers or distributors. The bill requires that these entities create their own stewardship program or be part of a stewardship program, which will be approved by CalRecycle. The bill mandates a minimum of 5 collection sites per county or if the county is larger it requires 1 per 50,000 people. They also require retail pharmacies to serve as an "authorized collector." Authorized collectors serve their counties in one location or 15% of store locations in the county, depending which is greater. The bill will begin January 2019, with approvals by CalRecycle completed and implementation of the programs started January 2021.

== See also ==
- Environmental impact of pharmaceuticals and personal care products
- Sharps waste
