= Regulation of chemicals =

The regulation of chemicals is the legislative intent of a variety of national laws or international initiatives such as agreements, strategies or conventions. These international initiatives define the policy of further regulations to be implemented locally as well as exposure or emission limits. Often, regulatory agencies oversee the enforcement of these laws.

Chemicals are regulated for:

- environmental protection (chemical waste, and chemical pollution of water, air, subterrestrial, and terrestrial environments such as of pesticides)
- human health (such as in cosmetics and foods) and drugs (recreational and pharmaceuticals)
- chemical weapons prohibition (such as for the Chemical Weapons Convention)

== International initiatives ==
Strategic Approach to International Chemicals Management (SAICM) -. This initiative was adopted at the International Conference on Chemicals Management (ICCM), which took place from 4–6 February 2006 in Dubai gathering governments and intergovernmental and non-governmental organizations. It defines a policy framework to foster the sound worldwide management of chemicals.

This initiative covers risk assessments of chemicals and harmonized labelling up to tackling obsolete and stockpiled products are included provisions for national centers aimed at helping in the developing world, training staff in chemical safety as well as dealing with spills and accidents. SAICM is a voluntary agreement. A second International Conference on Chemicals Management -ICCM2- held in May 2009 in Geneva took place to enhance synergies and cost-effectiveness and to promote SAICM’s multi-sectorial nature.

Globally Harmonized System of Classification and Labeling of Chemicals (GHS)[]

The “Globally Harmonized System of Classification and Labelling of Chemicals” (GHS) proposes harmonized hazard communication elements, including labels and safety data sheets. It was adopted by the United Nations Economic Commission for Europe (UNECE) in 2002. This system aims to ensure a better protection of human health and the environment during the handling of chemicals, including their transport and use. The classification of chemicals is done based on their hazard. This harmonization will facilitate trade when implemented entirely.

Stockholm Convention - The Stockholm Convention is a global treaty to protect human health and the environment from persistent organic pollutants (POPs). It entered into force, on 17 May 2004, and over 150 countries signed the Convention. In May 2009, nine new chemicals are proposed for listing which then contained 12 substances.

Rotterdam Convention – The objectives of the Rotterdam Convention are:

- to promote shared responsibility and cooperative efforts among Parties in the international trade of certain hazardous chemicals in order to protect human health and the environment from potential harm;
- to contribute to the environmentally sound use of those hazardous chemicals, by facilitating information exchange about their characteristics, by providing for a national decision-making process on their import and export and by disseminating these decisions to Parties.

The text of the Convention was adopted on 10 September 1998 by a Conference in Rotterdam, the Netherlands. The Convention entered into force on 24 February 2004. The Convention creates legally binding obligations for the implementation of the Prior Informed Consent (PIC) procedure.

Basel Convention –The Basel Convention on the Control of Trans-boundary Movements of Hazardous Wastes and their Disposal is a global environmental agreement on hazardous and other wastes. It came into force in 1992. The Convention has 172 Parties and aims to protect human health and the environment against the adverse effects resulting from the generation, management, transboundary movements and disposal of hazardous and other wastes.

Montreal Protocol – The Montreal Protocol was a globally coordinated regulatory action that sought to regulate ozone-depleting chemicals. 191 countries have ratified the treaty.

Global Framework on Chemicals - The plan was adopted on 30 September 2023 in Bonn at the fifth session of the International Conference on Chemicals Management organized by the UN Environment Programme (UNEP).

== Regional regulations ==
USA: The Environmental Protection Agency (EPA) of the US announced in 2009 that the chemicals management laws would be strengthened, and that it would initiate a comprehensive approach to enhance the chemicals management program, including:

- New Regulatory Risk Management Actions
- Development of Chemical Action Plans, which will target the risk management efforts on chemicals of concern
- Requiring Information Needed to Understand Chemical Risks
- Increasing Public Access to Information About Chemicals
- Engaging Stakeholders in Prioritizing Chemicals for Future Risk Management Action.

Chemicals are regulated under various laws including the Toxic Substances Control Act (TSCA). In 2010, Congress was considering a new law entitled the Safe Chemicals Act. Over the following several years, the Senate considered a number of legislative texts to amend the TSCA. These included the Safer Chemicals Act, several versions of which were introduced by Senator Frank Lautenberg (D-NJ), with the latest in 2013, and the Chemical Safety Improvement Act (S. 1009, CSIA) introduced by Senators Lautenberg and David Vitter (R-LA) in 2013. Senator Lautenberg died shortly after CSIA's introduction, and over time his mantle was picked up by Senator Tom Udall (D-NM), who continued to work with Senator Vitter on revisions to the CSIA. The result of that effort was the Frank R. Lautenberg Chemical Safety for the 21st Century Act, passed by the Senate on December 17, 2015. The Toxic Substances Control Act (TSCA) Modernization Act of 2015 (H.R. 2576), passed the House of Representatives on June 23, 2015.

Revised legislation, which resolved differences between the House and Senate versions, was forwarded to the President on June 14, 2016. President Obama signed the bill into law on June 22, 2016. The Senator's widow, Bonnie Lautenberg, was present at the White House signing ceremony.

EU: Chemicals in Europe are managed by the REACH (Registration, Evaluation and Authorization and Restriction of Chemicals) and the CLP (Classification, Labeling and Packaging) regulations. Specific regulations exist for specific families of products such as Fertilizers, Detergents, Explosives, Pyrotechnic Articles, Drug Precursors.

Canada: In Canada, the Chemicals Management Plan is responsible for designating priority chemicals, gathering public information about those chemicals, and generating risk assessment and management strategies.

== Issues ==
A study suggests and defines a 'planetary boundary' for novel entities such as plastic- and chemical pollution and concluded that it has been crossed, suggesting – alongside many other studies and indicators – that more and improved regulations or related changes (e.g. enforcement- or trade-related changes) are necessary.

Using drug discovery artificial intelligence algorithms, researchers generated 40,000 potential chemical weapon candidates. According to a senior scientist author of the study, synthesizing these chemicals for real harm would be the more difficult part and certain needed molecules for doing so are known and regulated – however, some viable candidates may only require currently non-regulated compounds.

Other issues include:

- the public and academic debate about drug prohibition or about health policy in respect to recreational drugs, nootropics and bodybuilding supplements.
- the lack of various requirements, quality standards and lab testing for dietary supplements (various product information may also be necessary in some cases – for example in the case of the supplement C_{60} which in a study showed significant morbidity and mortality in mice in under 2 weeks when exposed to room-level light levels).

== See also ==
- Regulation of science
- Regulation of nanotechnology
- DEA list of chemicals
- Emergency Planning and Community Right-to-Know Act
- Safety data sheet
- Chemophobia
- Environmental Persistent Pharmaceutical Pollutant EPPP
