= Drug recycling =

Recycling of unused medication

Drug recycling, also referred to as medication redispensing or medication re-use, is the idea that health care organizations or patients with unused drugs can transfer them in a safe and appropriate way to another patient in need. The purpose of such a program is reducing medication waste, thereby saving healthcare costs; improving patients’ access to necessary medication and overall enlarging medications' availability; and alleviating the environmental burden of medication.

== The debate ==
Despite the need for waste-preventive measures, the debate of drug recycling programs is ongoing. It is traditional to expect that consumers get prescription drugs from a pharmacy and that the pharmacy got their drugs from a trusted source, such as manufacturer or wholesaler. In a drug recycling program, consumers would access drugs through a less standardized supply chain. Consequently, concerns of the quality of the recycled drugs arise.

However, in a regulated process, monitored by specialized pharmacies or medical organizations, these uncertainties can be overcome. For example, monitoring the storage conditions, including temperature, light, humidity and agitation of medication, can contribute to regulation of the quality of recycled drugs. For this purpose, pharmaceutical packaging could be upgraded with sensing technologies, that can also be designed to detect counterfeits. Such packaging requires an initial investment, but this can be compensated with potential cost savings obtained by a drug recycling program. Additionally, integrating technology like blockchain can provide more traceability to donated medications while also making tampering more difficult. Accordingly, drugs recycling seems economically viable for expensive drugs, such as HIV post-exposure prophylaxis medication or oral chemotherapy used to treat various cancers.

== Donating practices ==
In some countries, drug recycling programs operate successfully by donating unused drugs to the less fortunate. In the United States, drug recycling programs exist locally, although Tennessee law allows programs based in that state to accept donations of approved unused prescriptions from individuals and clinics anywhere in the United States. As of 2010, Canada had fewer drug recycling programs than the United States. These programs occur in specific pharmacies only, since these pharmacies are prepared to address the special requirements of participating in a recycling program. Usually, drug returns happen without financial compensation. In Greece, the organization GIVMED operates in drug recycling, and saved over half a million euros by recycling almost 60k drug packages since 2016.

However, in other countries, such as Canada, implementation of drug recycling programs is limited. Other initiatives focus on donating drugs to third world countries. However, this is accompanied with ethical constraints due to uncertainties in quality, as well as practical constraints, due to making the drugs only temporarily available and not necessarily addressing local needs. The World Health Organization provided guidelines on appropriate drug donation, thereby discouraging donation practices that do not consider recipient's needs, government policies, effective coordination or quality standards.

== Toward re-dispensing as standard of care ==
Alternatively, drug recycling programs could be set as routine clinical practice with the aim of reducing the economic and environmental burden of medication waste. Still, for general implementation of drug recycling programs, clear professional guidelines are required. Research could provide the rationale for these guidelines. For example, research showed that a majority of patients is willing to use recycled drugs if the quality is maintained, and explored requirements for a drug recycling program perceived by stakeholders, including the general public, pharmacists. and policy-makers.

One can assume that implementing drug recycling as routine clinical practice is only attractive from an economical perspective, if the savings exceed the operational pharmacy costs. For this purpose, research should assess the feasibility of drug recycling. In the Netherlands, re-dispensing of unused oral anti-cancer drugs is currently tested in routine clinical practice to determined cost-savings of a quality-controlled process. This data could help policy-makers to prioritize drug recycling on their agenda, thereby facilitating guidelines for general implementation of drug recycling.

In the United States, re-dispensing of recycled prescription drugs is regulated on a state-by-state basis. Among the 50 U.S. states, 42 allow for the reuse of donated prescription medication by patients in need as defined by each state’s laws.
