= National Take Back Initiative =

The National Take Back Initiative is a voluntary program in the United States, encouraging the public to return excess or expired drugs. The take back events occur twice annually, in the spring and in the fall. The program is coordinated by the Drug Enforcement Administration (DEA).

Drug take-back programs are a common and environmentally supportive method for avoiding the improper disposal of unused pharmaceuticals. One of the objectives of the program is to avoid disposal of drugs by flushing them to the local sewage system, which causes water pollution. Municipal sewage treatment plants are not designed to treat pharmaceuticals, and the drugs tend to pass through the plant untreated, to the receiving water body.

== Background ==
In 2010, according to the Centers for Disease Control and Prevention, enough pharmaceuticals were prescribed to medicate every American adult around-the-clock for one month. Some of these prescriptions and over the counter drugs decay in the home and are highly susceptible to diversion, misuse, and abuse. Often, more Americans currently abuse prescription drugs than the number of those using cocaine, hallucinogens, heroin, and inhalants combined, according to the 2010 National Survey on Drug Use and Health. Studies show that the majority of teens who abuse prescription drugs obtain them from family or friends for free, including from the home medicine cabinet. Improper disposal methods can pose both safety and environmental hazards.

== Legislation and national policy ==
Four days following the DEA’s first Take-Back Day on September 25, 2010, Congress approved and amendment to the Controlled Substances Act. This action provided the DEA with the option to develop a permanent process for people to safely and conveniently dispose of their prescription drugs. President Barack Obama signed the Secure and Responsible Drug Disposal Act of 2010, and the DEA immediately began installing regulations for a more permanent solution.

The DEA’s Take-Back events are also a reflection of the President's prescription drug abuse prevention strategy entitled "Epidemic: Responding to America’s Prescription Drug Abuse Crisis" developed and promoted by the Office of National Drug Control Policy. Ridding medicine cabinets of unused or expired medications in American homes is one of the four main items addressed the strategy for reducing diversion prescription drug abuse. The other action items include educating the public as well as health care providers. In turn, this system establishes prescription drug monitoring programs in all the states.

== Current operation ==
In April 2021, the program reported the collection of 420 short tons (380,000 kg) of drugs at 5,060 sites around the country.

== See also ==
- Drug disposal
- Environmental impact of pharmaceuticals and personal care products
