= Environmental persistent pharmaceutical pollutant =

Environmental term

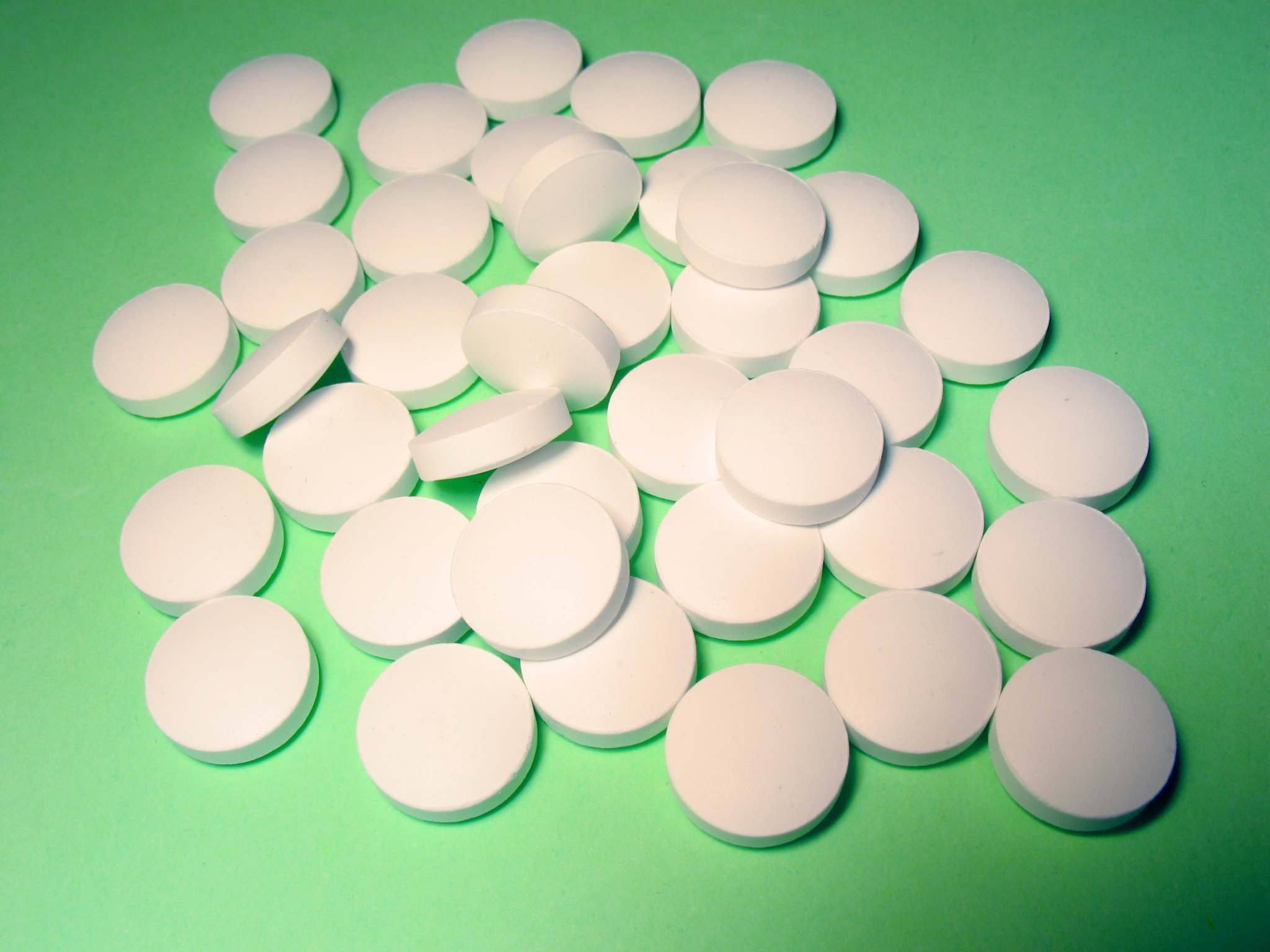
Pharmaceutical drugs have various known and unknown effects on the environment.

The term environmental persistent pharmaceutical pollutants (EPPP) was first suggested in the nomination in 2010 of pharmaceuticals and environment as an emerging issue in a Strategic Approach to International Chemicals Management (SAICM) by the International Society of Doctors for the Environment (ISDE). The occurring problems from EPPPs are in parallel explained under environmental impact of pharmaceuticals and personal care products (PPCP). The European Union summarizes pharmaceutical residues with the potential of contamination of water and soil together with other micropollutants under "priority substances".

== Background ==
Pharmaceuticals comprise one of the few groups of chemicals that are specifically designed to act on living cells. They present a special risk when they persist in the environment.

With the exception of watercourses downstream of sewage treatment plants, the concentration of pharmaceuticals in surface and ground water is generally low. Concentrations in sewage sludge and in landfill leachate may be substantially higher and provide alternative routes for EPPPs to enter the human and animal food-chain.

However, even at very low environmental concentrations (often ug/L or ng/L), the chronic exposure to environmental pharmaceuticals chemicals can add to the effects of other chemicals in the cocktail is still not studied. The different chemicals might be potentiating synergistic effects (higher than additive effects). An extremely sensitive group in this respect are foetuses.

EPPPs are already found in water all over the world. The diffuse exposure might contribute to

- extinction of species and imbalance of sensible ecosystems, as many EPPPs affect the reproductive systems of for example frogs, mussels, and fish;
- genetic, developmental, immune and hormonal health effects to humans and other species, in the same way as e.g. oestrogen-like chemicals;
- development of microbes resistant to antibiotics, as is found in India.

=== Environmental classification of pharmaceuticals ===
In Sweden, industry together with universities and the health care sector has developed a method for environmental risk assessment and environmental classification of drugs. Environmental risk refers to the risk of toxicity to the aquatic environment. It is based on the ratio between predicted environmental concentration of the substance (PEC) and the highest concentration of the substance that does not have a harmful effect in the environment (PNEC).

Environmental hazard expresses the inherent environmentally damaging characteristics of the substance in terms of persistence, bioaccumulation and toxicity. The toxicity tests used are acute toxicity of fish, acute toxicity of Daphnia sp. and growth inhibition test of algae. Most medications on the Swedish market are now classified. This gives the healthcare sector the possibility to make better choices when prescribing medicines.

=== Exposure ===
Concentrations in surface waters, groundwater and partially treated water are typically less than 0.1 μg/L (or 100 ng/L), and concentrations in treated water are generally below 0.05 μg/L (or 50 ng/L). However, all water on the earth is part of the same stable pool, and as larger amounts of pharmaceuticals are consumed, there is a risk that the concentration of pharmaceuticals in drinking water will increase.

=== Release into the environment ===
Pharmaceuticals reach the environment and cause water pollution mainly in three ways:

- They are excreted from humans and animals, intact or metabolised, mainly into the urine, passing on to the environment directly or via sewage treatment plants.
- Unused pharmaceuticals reach the environment either via household wastewater or via urban solid garbage handling.
- Manufacturing plants producing the active substances might unintentionally release pharmaceuticals into the environment.

Due to improved measurement methods, pharmaceuticals may be detected today in concentrations that probably have been present already for decades but could not be measured before. Many pharmaceuticals are (after consumption) excreted or washed off: investigations have shown excretion rates between 30% and 70% of orally taken substances and even higher rates considering externally applied ointments or gel.

Some pharmaceuticals are degraded to various extents in sewage treatment plants, but others leave the plant in active forms. Active residues of pharmaceuticals have been detected in surface water, and they may persist in the environment for long periods of time. Large amounts of antibiotics and other pharmaceuticals have been found downstream from sewage treatment plants in sub catchments where the discharge of hospital wastewater plays a major role or in catchments with pharmaceutical industries. EPPPs from treated sewage sludge used as fertilizer are absorbed by soya, and antibiotics have been found in the leaves.

== Drinking water ==
There are various pathways how pharmaceutical substances may enter drinking water. Predominantly, drinking water procurement comes from drinking water reservoirs, groundwater and bank filtration. If treated wastewater is discharged in catchments with drinking water procurement, the not eliminated pharmaceutical substances may be detected in the drinking water. The Netherlands for example gain 37% of their drinking water from surface water, mainly from bank filtration at Rhine and Meuse. Here certain attention is paid to pharmaceutical residues.

In German drinking water catchments and rivers, EPPPs have been detected already, especially radiocontrast agents. Moreover, pharmaceutical residues here partly have their origin in agriculture. An evaluation of the German Federal Environment Agency of regional investigations carried out between 2009 and 2011 showed in total 27 different pharmaceutical substances in concentrations of more than 0.1 microgram per litre in German surface waters and up to 150 substances have been detected in total. Besides the radiocontrast agents, the painkiller diclofenac showed relevant concentrations. For many micropollutants such as pharmaceuticals no threshold values in drinking water purification or waste water treatment are obligatory by now as the knowledge about effects is lacking or insufficiently proven.

Some of these environmental pharmaceutical chemicals are well known to have serious genotoxic effects in humans. Half-life in nature varies depends on the environment (air, water, soil, sludge), but is more than one year for several compounds.

Concentrations of EPPPs can vary from 1 ng per litre to 1 mg per litre (2). Serious effects of EPPPs on water-living organisms, especially on reproductive systems, and on microbial communities have been already shown.

One way to minimize the risks would be to keep excrement out of the wastewater via the use of the urine-diverting dry toilets or switch systems that recycle treated blackwater for flushing.

== Assessment ==
- Pharmaceuticals are special kinds of chemicals. They are manufactured to be biologically active in living organisms.
- The levels of pharmaceuticals in surface or drinking water are generally below 1 mg per litre, often measured in ng per litre. This low concentration might appear to guarantee that they hardly pose any problem to public health. Assuming a concentration of 100 ng/L of a pharmaceutical that in humans has a DDD (defined daily dose) of 10 mg implies that a volume of 100,000 litres would be required to make up one single DDD. Such calculation does not take into account vulnerable population exposure for example during the period of development.
- Therapeutic levels of levonorgestrel (a sex hormone) have been found in rainbow trout downstream a sewage treatment plant.

== Laws and regulations ==
Environmental persistent pharmaceutical pollutants (EPPP) have to be looked at in their entirety of the product chain. Pharmaceutical residues may enter the environment in various phases and therefore the influence or impact regarding environmental effects can be regulated on different levels:

- on the scientific and industrial level of development and production,
- on the governmental and administrative level of authorization, market regulation and legislation,
- on the level of health insurance and its influence on production and consumption,
- on the distribution level with physicians and their prescriptions respectively in pharmacies and stores,
- on the level of patients with individual consumption pattern, disposal behavior etc. and finally
- in the field of waste management, waste water treatment and drinking water supply.

Pharmaceuticals differ from other anthropogenic chemicals with respect to legal requirements and depending on the countries and cultural frame. Partly they are excluded in laws and regulations which control manufacture, marketing, use, and disposal of other consumer products of a chemical character (solvents, paints, glues etc.). As a consequence the possible negative environmental impact of pharmaceuticals may be less documented, in comparison to other consumer chemicals.

=== Laws and regulations in the European Union ===
In the European Union (EU) today, more than 3,000 pharmaceutical substances are approved. In 2013 the EU started initiatives to address to the task of pharmaceutical residues in the water cycle. Here the commission was proposing to add 15 chemicals to the watch list of substances in the Water Framework Directive (WFD) that are monitored and controlled in EU surface waters, including 3 pharmaceuticals (besides industrial chemicals, substances used in biocides and plant protection products): "The contamination of water and soil with pharmaceutical residues is an emerging environmental concern. In evaluating and controlling the risk to, or via, the aquatic environment from medicinal products, adequate attention should be paid to Union environmental objectives. In order to address that concern, the Commission should study the risks of environmental effects from medicinal products and provide an analysis of the relevance and effectiveness of the current legislative framework in protecting the aquatic environment and human health via the aquatic environment."

The two hormones estradiol and ethinylestradiol and the painkiller diclofenac are present on the list since 2013 and in 2015 three macrolide antibiotics were added, too. In 2018, due to "sufficient high-quality monitoring data are available for the substances tri-allate, oxadiazon, 2,6-ditert-butyl-4-methylphenol and diclofenac, those substances should be removed from the watch list" and that "new ecotoxicological information for the macrolide antibiotics clarithromycin and azithromycin, for methiocarb, and for the neonicotinoids imidacloprid, thiacloprid and thiamethoxam, which led it to revise the predicted no-effect concentrations for those substances". The objective of the implementation of the WFD watch list is to update the available information on the fate of the listed substances in the aquatic environment and consequently, to support a more detailed environmental risk assessment. A preparatory"study on the environmental risks of medicinal products" was commissioned by the Executive Agency for Health and Consumers and published in December 2013. This "BIO IS study" discusses a wide range of legislative and non-legislative "factors of influence" and related possible solutions.

According to the 2013 Directive "the Commission shall [...until September 2015] develop a strategic approach to pollution of water by pharmaceutical substances. That strategic approach shall, where appropriate, include proposals enabling, to the extent necessary, the environmental impacts of medicines to be taken into account more effectively in the procedure for placing medicinal products on the market. In the framework of that strategic approach, the Commission shall, where appropriate, by 14 September 2017 propose measures to be taken at Union and / or Member State level, as appropriate, to address the possible environmental impacts of pharmaceutical substances [...] with a view to reducing discharges, emissions and losses of such substances into the aquatic environment, taking into account public health needs and the cost effectiveness of the measures proposed."

Beyond the precautionary approach the EU was already aiming at proper disposal practices since 2004. An EU directive for human pharmaceuticals explicitly requires that all member states should establish collection systems for unused or expired medicines. Such systems were already in use in several member states at the time the legislation went into action in 2004. The disposal regulations in the EU member states are still rather different, ranging from recommendations to throw unused or expired pharmaceuticals into the household waste that goes nearly completely to incineration (Germany) with temperatures usually between 900–1,300 °C to collection systems where leftovers are considered to be "hazardous waste" (Luxembourg).

In France, the Cyclamed take-back program enables people to bring back unused or expired pharmaceuticals back to the pharmacies. Wrong disposal via sink or toilet and hereby to the wastewater system still seems to be a problem in many EU member states: investigations in Germany showed that up to 24% of liquid pharmaceuticals and 7% of tablets or ointments are disposed always or at least "rarely" via the toilet or sink.

This is one of the aspects considered in the above-mentioned EU strategic approaches. Moreover, regarding the market authorization for pharmaceuticals approved for marketing in the EU before 2006 the environmental assessment criteria have been different. In case the active substance of a human medicinal product today is assessed to be a hazardous substance or assessed to pose a risk to the environment: no refusal of the product is possible, even though in 2012 about 1,200 pharmaceutical substances were identified to be potentially relevant for an environmental monitoring.

== Effects of pharmaceuticals in the environment ==
=== Estradiol (estrogen, synthetic hormone) ===
Concentrations in surface water alone are not sufficient to assess the risk of negative environmental effects in the aquatic environment. Synthetic hormones are endocrine disruptors. Thus, estrogenic compounds like ethinylestradiol (estrogen hormone) at concentrations < 1 ng per litre may cause both vitellogenin production (a frequently used index for feminization of male fish), and structural change in their sex organs. It has also been demonstrated that fish exposed to sewage treatment plant (STP) effluent can take up and concentrate estrogenic compounds, including ethinylestradiol, to very high internal levels. These observations on feminization of fish by estrogenic compounds in STP effluents have been observed in many countries, and have also been observed in other species, like frogs, alligators and molluscs.

=== Cardiovascular medicines ===
Other examples of environmental impact in the aquatic environment of human medication concern both cardiovascular and neuro-psychiatric medicines. The non-selective beta-blocking agent propranolol was found to cause a significant decrease in egg production in medaka fish, at a concentration close to that demonstrated in the sewage treatment plants (STP) effluents. Gemfibrozil (cholesterol and triglycerides lowering drug) often appears in the effluent from STPs. At concentrations close to those reported in STP effluent, gemfibrozil lowers the blood levels of testosterone in fish.

=== Citalopram / Fluoxetine (serotonin reuptake inhibitor anti depressants, SSRIs) ===
Some SSRIs have been shown to accumulate in exposed fish. Citalopram has been detected in liver from wild perch in low μg per kg levels, and fluoxetine affects the serotonin system in the same way that it does in humans. Fluoxetine has also been shown to affect swimming activity in shellfish; whether this is linked to a disturbance of serotonin function in the brain is still unknown.

=== Antibiotics ===
High levels of antibiotics in the water are a cause for alarm as there is an increased risk of selecting resistant bacteria, an issue of global concern. This can lead to some highly effective antibiotics becoming ineffective. There are several examples: In India, bacteria resistant to ciprofloxacin have been found downstream pharmaceutical plants, genes for multi resistance were found in drinking water, and multi resistant Salmonella in water sprayed on vegetables. From Europe we know about the epidemic with multi resistant EHEC in summer 2011, originating from water sprayed vegetables.

The term "eco-shadow" has been introduced to describe the ecological impact of antibiotics. Antibiotics with a wide spectrum that are also stable will have a greater impact on the bacterial flora (a long eco-shadow) than those with a narrow antibacterial spectrum which disintegrates more rapidly (a short eco-shadow).

The ecological effects of tetracyclines and quinolones have been observed. They are not metabolized in the human body and are therefore excreted unmodified. When entered into the environment they are poorly degraded. They can be toxic to other animals, affecting particularly microorganism and fish. In the effluent from a sewage treatment plant in India, several broad spectrum antibiotics were found in concentrations toxic to bacteria and plants. In the sewage treatment plant itself, there were enterococci resistant to all known antibiotics.

== Gaps in knowledge ==
Effective environmental detection methods have to be developed and global detection strategy applied to map the current global situation.

There are currently no test methods to assess whether negative effects may occur after long-term environmental diffuse exposure in humans, during the vulnerable periods of development, on aquatic micro-organism or how it may affect other animals. Therefore, the precautionary principle must be guiding.

Concentrations in surface water alone are not sufficient to assess the risk of negative environmental effects of these synthetic chemicals. Consideration must be taken to bio-accumulation in fish and other aquatic food used by humans, as well as to additive and synergetic effects between pharmaceutical and other chemicals in the contaminated water.

In a small study, several pharmaceuticals were found in milk of goat, cow and human. More research is needed to find out how common this is, the concentrations and the sources.

== See also ==
- Drug pollution
- Environmental impact of pharmaceuticals and personal care products
- Persistent organic pollutant
- Regulation of chemicals
- Reuse of human excreta
