= International Society of Doctors for the Environment =

- Formation: 25 November 1990
- Headquarters: Basel, Switzerland
- Website: www.isde.org

The International Society of Doctors for the Environment (ISDE) is an NGO, founded at Cortona on 25 November 1990, by doctors of various nationalities, in order to gather all doctors interested in medical problems related to ecological problems, spread awareness of the connection between environmental pollution and human health, start and support initiatives from local to global levels, and to reduce or eliminate sources of pollution and environmental pollution. ISDE has consultative status with the WHO and the United Nations Economic and Social Council.

== Activities ==
- In 2011, ISDE nominated Environmental Persistent Pharmaceutical Pollutants (EPPPs) to the UNEP organisation SAICM.

== Member organisations ==
There are member organisations in 38 countries (predominantly Europe and the Americas). Some of these organisations are listed below:

- Albania: National Association of Hygienists of Albania (NAHA)
- Algeria: Association for the Protection of the Environment and Sustainable Development (APEDD); Association des jeunes volontaire pour la protection et la sauvegarde de l'environnement (AJVPSE)
- Argentina: Asociación Argentina de Médicos por el Medio Ambiente
- Australia: Doctors for the Environment (Australia) Incorporated (DEA)
- Austria: Ärztinnen und Ärzte für eine Gesunde Umwelt (ÄGU) - ISDE Austria
- Belgium: Belgische Artsen voor het Milieu - Médecins Belges pour l'Environnement (see also: EPH); HECTOR asbl - Health and Environment Care Technical Organisation
- Brazil: Medicos pelo Ambiente (MEPA)
- Canada: Canadian Association of Physicians for the Environment (CAPE)
- Ecuador: Corporación para el Desarrollo de la Producción y el Medio Ambiente Laboral
- France: L'Association pour la Recherche Thérapeutique Anti-Cancéreuse, ARTAC; see also La Medecine Environnementale and Appel de Paris
- Germany: Ökologischer Ärztebund
- Hungary: Magyar Orvosok az Egeszseges Koernyezetert Tarsasag
- Ireland: Irish Doctors Environmental Association (I.D.E.A.)
- Italy: Associazione Medici per l'Ambiente - ISDE Italia
- Kenya: Association of Physicians and Medical Workers for Social Responsibility, PSR Kenya
- Macedonia: Zdruzenie na Doktori za zivotna sredina MADE
- Malta: SahhAmbjent
- Pakistan: Sustainable Development Policy Institute
- Netherlands: Nederlandse Vereniging voor Medische Milieukunde (NVMM)
- Serbia: SOCIETY OF ECOLOGISTS IN HEALTH CARE (SEHC)
- Sweden: Svenska Läkare för Miljön
- Switzerland: Ärztinnen und Ärzte für Umweltschutz, Mèdecins en Faveur de l'Environnement, Medici per l'Ambiente
- Turkey: Cevre Icin Hekimler Dernegi
- Ukraine: Green Doctors - Ukrainian Association of Doctors for the Environment
- United Kingdom: British Society for Ecological Medicine
- USA: Physicians for Social Responsibility (PSR)
- Uzbekistan: Center Perzent - The Karakalpak Center for Reproductive Health and Environment
