= Environmental impact of pharmaceuticals and personal care products =

Effects of drugs on the environment

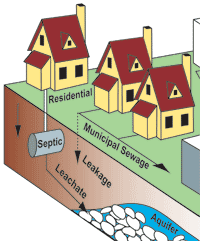
Methods of PPCP entry into the environment from residential homes via septic and sewage systems

The environmental effects of pharmaceutical and personal care products (PPCPs) has been of concern since at least the 1990s. PPCPs include substances used by individuals for personal health or cosmetic reasons and the products used by agribusiness to boost growth or health of livestock. More than twenty million tons of PPCPs are produced every year. The European Union has declared that pharmacological residues with the potential for contamination of water and the soil are "priority substances".^{[3]}

PPCPs have been detected in waters throughout the world. More research is needed to evaluate the risks of toxicity, persistence, and bioaccumulation, but current research shows that personal care products affect the environment and other species, such as coral reefs and fish. PPCPs encompass environmental persistent pharmaceutical pollutants (EPPPs) and are one type of persistent organic pollutants. They are not removed in conventional sewage treatment plants but require a fourth treatment stage which not many plants have.

In 2022, the most comprehensive study of pharmacological pollution of the world's rivers showed that it threatens "environmental and/or human health in more than a quarter of the studied locations". It investigated 1052 sampling sites along 258 rivers in 104 countries, representing pollution of rivers serving 470 million people. It showed that "the most contaminated sites were in low- to middle-income countries and were associated with areas with poor wastewater and waste management infrastructure and pharmaceutical product manufacture" and listed the most frequently detected and concentrated pharmaceutical products.

== Overview ==
Since the 1990s, water pollution by pharmaceutical products has been an environmental issue of concern. Many public health professionals in the USA began writing reports of pharmaceutical product contamination in waterways in the 1970s." Most pharmacological agents are deposited in the environment through human consumption of pharmaceutical product and excretion of their active ingredients, and are often filtered ineffectively by municipal sewage treatment plants, which are not designed to manage them. Once in the water, they can have diverse subtle effects on organisms, although research is still limited. Pharmacological agents may also be deposited in the environment through improper disposal, run-off from sludge fertilizer and reclaimed wastewater irrigation, and leaky sewer pipes. In 2009, an investigative report by Associated Press concluded that US manufacturers had legally released 271 million pounds of compounds used as medicines into the environment, 92% of which were the industrial chemicals phenol and hydrogen peroxide, which are also used as antiseptics. It could not distinguish between drugs released by manufacturers as opposed to the pharmaceutical industry. It also showed that an estimated 250 million pounds of pharmaceutical products and contaminated packaging were discarded by hospitals and long-term care facilities. The series of articles led to a hearing conducted by the US Senate Subcommittee on Transportation Safety, Infrastructure Security, and Water Quality. This hearing was designed to address the amounts of pharmacological contaminants in US drinking water. This was the first time that pharmaceutical companies were questioned about their waste disposal methods. "No federal regulations or laws were created as a result of the hearing." "Between 1970 and 2018 more than 3000 pharmacological chemicals were manufactured, but only 17 are screened or tested for in waterways." Alternatively, "There are no studies designed to examine the effects of pharmaceutical contaminated drinking water on human health." In parallel, the European Union is the second biggest consumer in the world (24% of the world total) after the USA, and in most EU Member States around half of unused human medicinal products are not collected to be disposed of properly. In the EU, 30-90% of orally administered doses are estimated to be excreted as active substances in the urine.

The term environmental persistent pharmaceutical pollutants (EPPP) was suggested in the 2010 nomination of pharmaceutical products and the environment as an emerging issue to Strategic Approach to International Chemicals Management (SAICM) by the International Society of Doctors for the Environment (ISDE).

=== Safe disposal ===
Depending on the sources and ingredients, there are various ways in which the public can dispose of pharmaceutical and personal care products in acceptable ways. The most environmentally safe disposal method is to take advantage of community drug take-back programs that collect drugs at a central location for proper disposal. Several local public health departments in the United States have initiated these programs. In addition, the United States Drug Enforcement Administration (DEA) periodically promotes local take-back programs, as well as the National Take Back Initiative.

Take-back programs in the US are funded by state or local health departments or are volunteer programs through pharmacies or health care providers. In recent years, the proposition that pharmaceutical manufacturers should be responsible for their products "from the cradle to the grave" has been gaining attention. Where there is no local take-back program, the U.S. Environmental Protection Agency (EPA) and the Office of National Drug Control Policy suggest in a 2009 guidance that consumers do the following:

1. take the prescription drugs out of their original containers
2. mix drugs with cat litter or used coffee grounds
3. place the mixture into a disposable container with a lid, such as a sealable bag
4. cover up any personal identification with a black marker that is on the original pill containers
5. place these containers in the bag with the mixture, seal them, and place them in the trash.

The intent of the recommended practices is that the chemicals would be separated from the open environment, especially water bodies, long enough for them to naturally break down.

When these substances find their way into water, it is much more difficult to deal with them. Water treatment facilities use different processes in order to minimize or eliminate these pollutants. This is done by using sorption where suspended solids are removed by sedimentation. Another method used is biodegradation, and through this method microorganisms, such as bacteria and fungi, feed on or break down these pollutants thus eliminating them from the contaminated media.

== Types ==
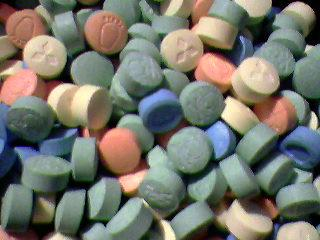
Illicit drugs such as ecstasy (above) can be found in waterways.

Pharmaceuticals, or prescription and over-the-counter medications made for human use or veterinary or agribusiness purposes, are common PPCPs found in the environment. There are nine classes of pharmaceuticals included in PPCPs: hormones, antibiotics, lipid regulators, nonsteroidal anti-inflammatory drugs, beta-blockers, antidepressants, anticonvulsants, antineoplastics, and diagnostic contrast media.^{[2]}

Personal care products have four classes: fragrances, preservatives, disinfectants, and sunscreen agents. These products may be found in cosmetics, perfumes, menstrual care products, lotions, shampoos, soaps, toothpastes, and sunscreen. These products typically enter the environment when passed through or washed off the body and into the ground or sewer lines, or when disposed of in the trash, septic tank, or sewage system.^{[3]}

Traces of illicit drugs can be found in waterways and may even be carried by money.^{[4]}

== Routes into the environment ==
More attention has been devoted since 2016 to PPCPs in the environment. Two causes may contribute to this: either PPCPs are really increasing in the environment owing to widespread use and/or analytical technology is better able to detect PPCPs in the environment. These substances enter the environment directly or indirectly. Direct methods include contamination of surface water by hospitals, households, industries, or sewage treatment plants. Direct contamination can also affect the sediment and soil.

It is generally assumed (albeit poorly verified) that the production of pharmaceutical products in industrialised countries is well controlled and not harmful to the environment, owing to the local legal restrictions that are usually required to permit production. However, a substantial fraction of the global production of pharmaceutical products takes place in low-cost production countries like India and China. Recent reports from India show that such production sites may emit very large quantities of e.g. antibiotics, yielding higher concentrations of the drugs in local surface waters than those found in the blood of patients during treatment.

The major route whereby pharmacological residues from pharmaceutical products reach the aquatic environment is most probably by excretion from patients undergoing pharmacological treatment. Since many pharmacological substances are not metabolized in the body they may be excreted in biologically active form, usually via the urine. Furthermore, many pharmacological substances are not fully taken up from the intestine (following oral administration in patients) into their bloodstream. The fraction not taken up into the bloodstream will remain in the gut and eventually be excreted via the feces. Hence, both urine and feces from treated patients contain pharmacological residues. Between 30 and 90% of an orally administered dose is generally excreted as active substance in the urine.

An additional conttribution to environmental pollution from pharmaceutical producs is improper disposal of unused or expired pharmaceutical residues. In European countries take-back systems for such residues are usually in place (although not always used to full extent), while in the USA there are only voluntary local initiatives. Although most of the waste goes to incineration, and people are asked to throw unused or expired pharmaceutical products into their household waste, investigations in Germany showed that up to 24% of liquid pharmaceutical products and 7% of tablets or ointments are disposed always or at least "rarely" via the toilet or sink.

Proper destruction of pharmaceutical products should yield products without any pharmacological or ecotoxic activity. Furthermore, the residues should not act as components in the environmental formation of new products. Incineration at a high temperature (>1000 degrees Celsius) is considered to fulfill the requirements, but even after incineration residual ashes should be properly disposed of.

Pharmaceutical products used in veterinary medicine, or as additives to animal feeds, pose a different problem, since they are excreted into the soil or possibly open surface waters. It is well known that such excretions may affect terrestrial organisms directly, leading to extinction of exposed species (e.g. dung-beetles). Lipid-soluble pharmacological residues from veterinary use may bind strongly to soil particles, with little tendency to leak out to ground water or to local surface waters. More water-soluble residues may be washed out in rain or melting snow and reach both ground water and surface water streams.

== Presence in the environment ==
The use of pharmaceutical and personal care products (PPCPs) is on the rise, with an estimated increase from 2 billion to 3.9 billion annual prescriptions between 1999 and 2009 in the USA alone. PPCPs enter the environment through individual human activity and as residues from manufacturing, agribusiness, veterinary use, and hospital and community use. In Europe, the input of pharmacological residues via domestic waste water is estimated to be around 80%, whereas 20% comes from hospitals. Individuals may add PPCPs to the environment through waste excretion and bathing as well as by direct disposal of unused medications to septic tanks, sewers, or trash. Because PPCPs tend to dissolve relatively easily and do not evaporate at normal temperatures, they often end up in soil and waters.

Some PPCPs are broken down or processed easily by a human or animal body and/or degrade quickly in the environment. However, others do not break down or degrade easily. The likelihood or ease with which an individual substance will break down depends on its chemical makeup and the metabolic pathway of the compound.

=== In rivers ===
In 2022, the most comprehensive study of pharmaceutical pollution of the world's rivers finds that it threatens "environmental and/or human health in more than a quarter of the studied locations". It investigated 1,052 sampling sites along 258 rivers in 104 countries, representing the river pollution of 470 million people. It found that "the most contaminated sites were in low- to middle-income countries and were associated with areas with poor wastewater and waste management infrastructure and pharmaceutical manufacturing" and lists the most frequently detected and concentrated pharmaceuticals.

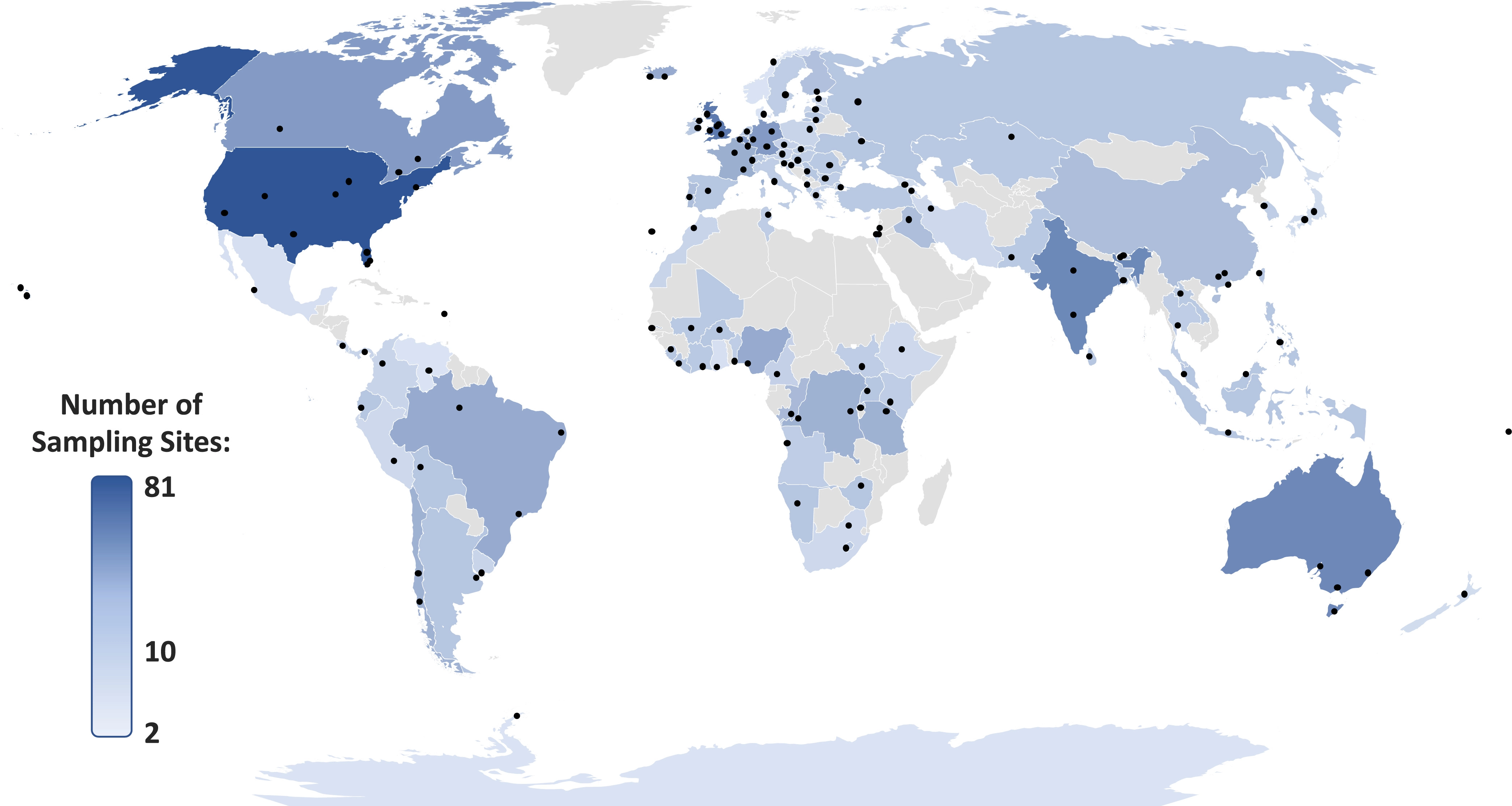
Locations of studied rivers/catchments (n = 137).
Points = groups of sampling sites across respective river catchments;
Shades of countries = total number of sampling sites.

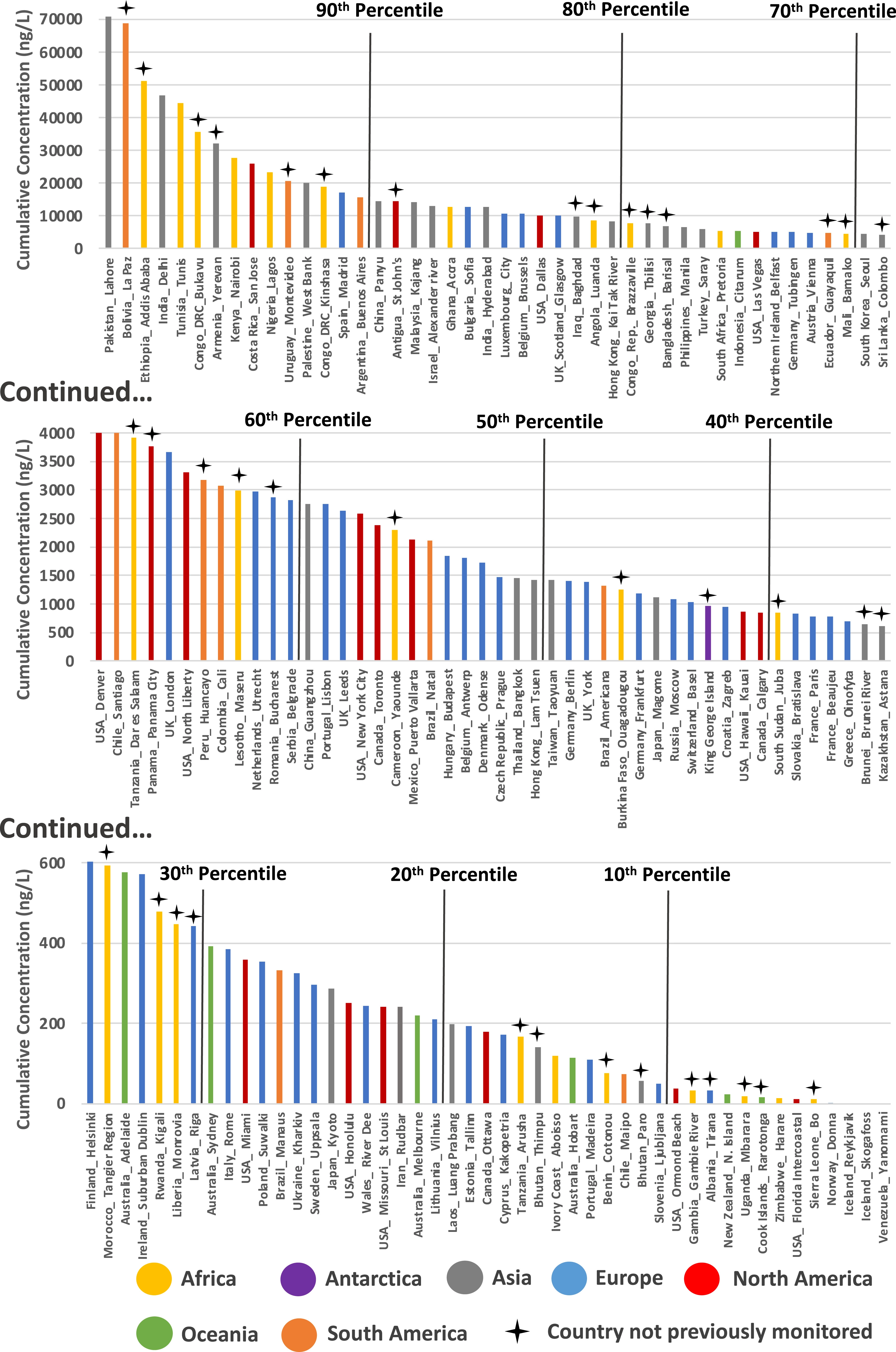
Concentrations

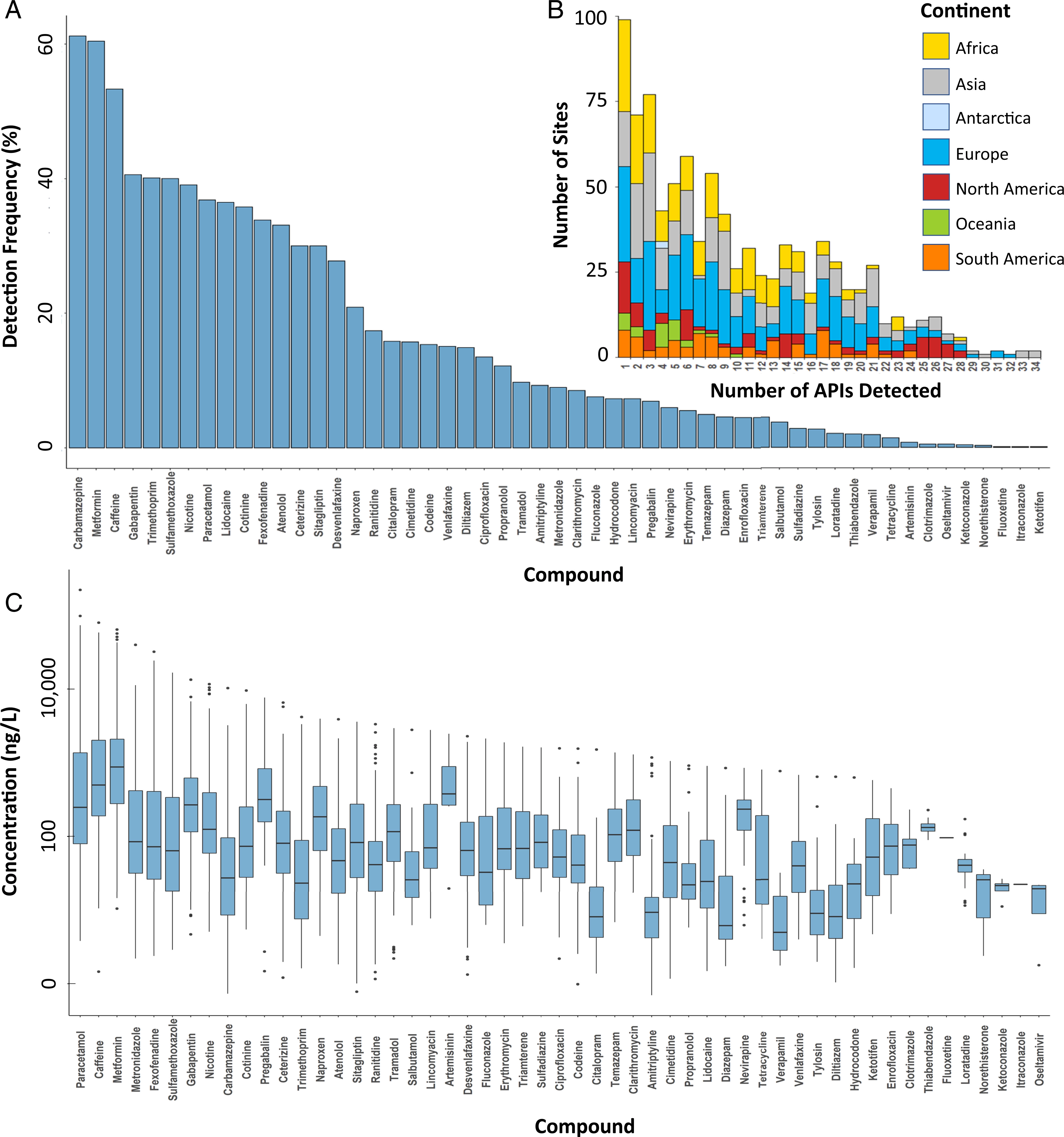
Detection frequencies and number of active pharmaceutical ingredients detected

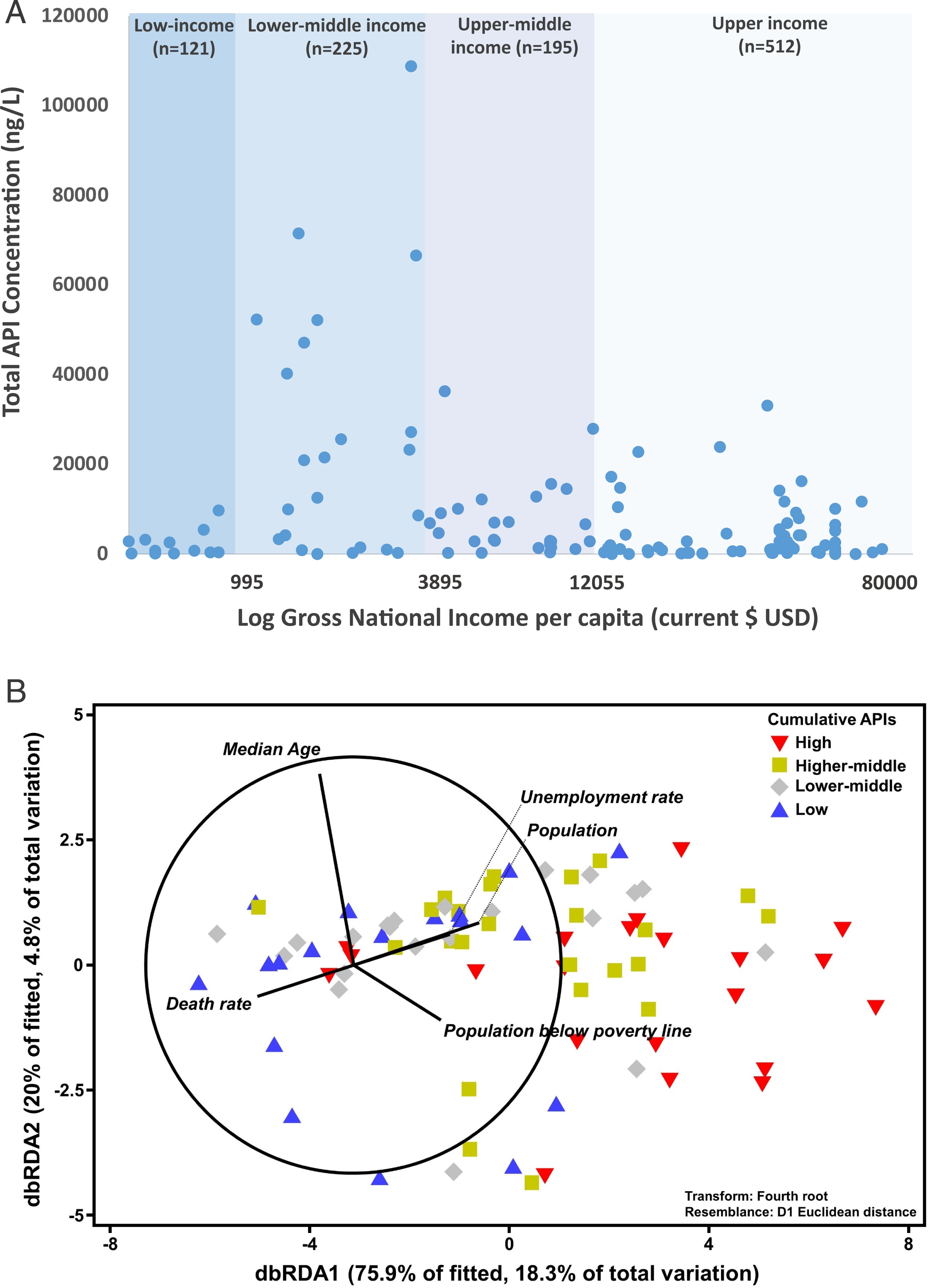
Cumulative concentrations of active pharmaceutical ingredients

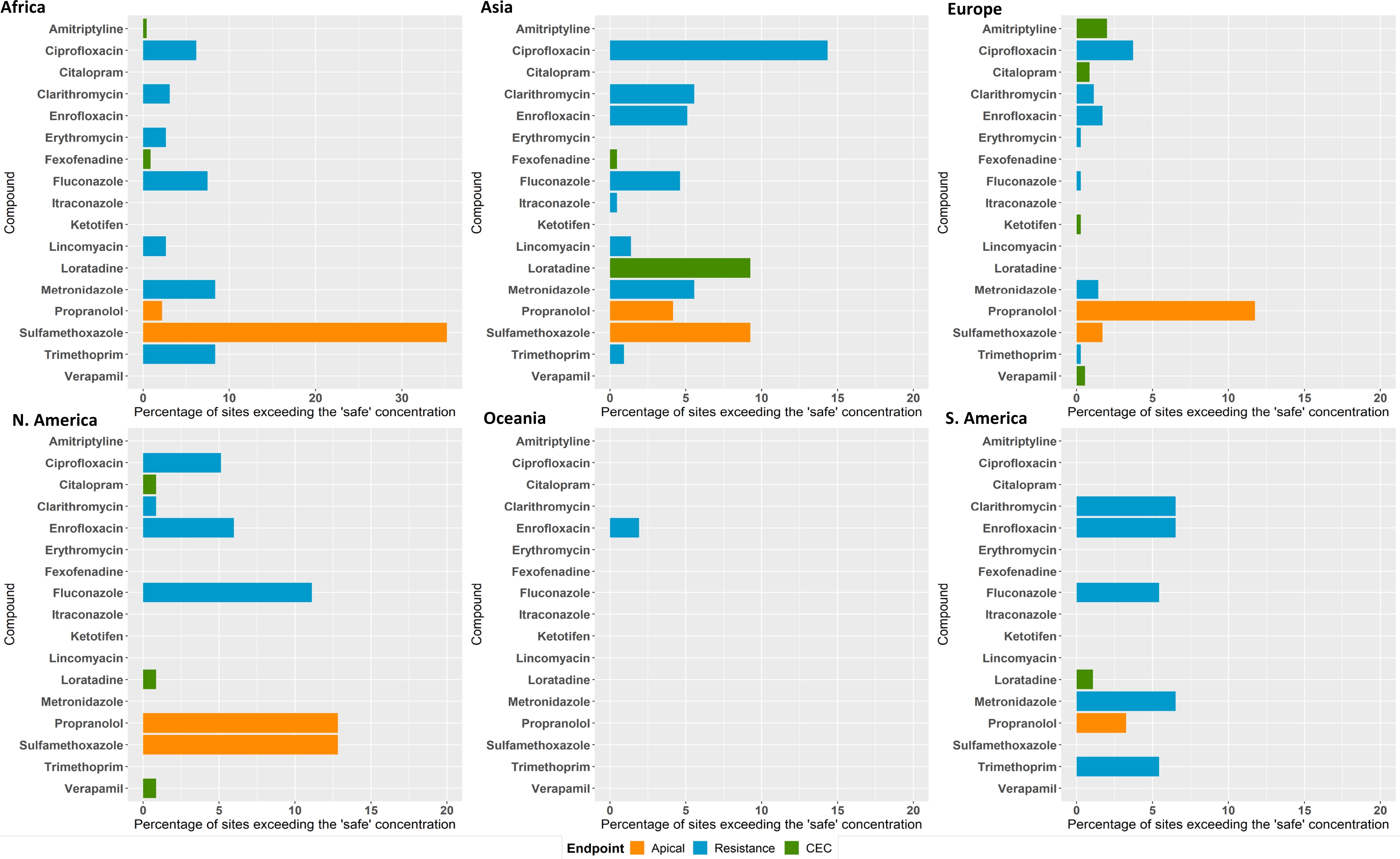
Sites exceeding "safe" limits

=== In groundwater ===
Trace amounts of pharmaceuticals from treated wastewater infiltrating into the aquifer are among emerging ground-water contaminants being studied throughout the United States. Popular pharmaceuticals such as antibiotics, anti-inflammatories, antidepressants, decongestants, tranquilizers, etc. are normally found in treated wastewater. This wastewater is discharged from the treatment facility, and often makes its way into the aquifer or source of surface water used for drinking water.

Trace amounts of pharmaceuticals in both groundwater and surface water are far below what is considered dangerous or of concern in most areas, but it could be an increasing problem as population grows and more reclaimed wastewater is utilized for municipal water supplies.

=== Recreational drugs ===
A study published in 2014 reported a spike in the levels of ecstasy, ketamine, caffeine and acetaminophen in nearby rivers coinciding with a Taiwanese youth event attended by around 600,000 people. In 2018, shellfish in Puget Sound, waters that receive treated sewage from the Seattle area, tested positive for oxycodone. The occurrence of pharmaceuticals and personal care products in wastewater is frequent and ubiquitous enough that PPCPs in wastewater can be measured to estimate their use in a community.

=== Studies prior to 2006 ===
A 2002 study by the U.S. Geological Survey found detectable quantities of one or more chemicals in 80 percent of a sampling of 139 susceptible streams in 30 states. The most common pharmaceuticals detected were nonprescription drugs; detergents, fire retardants, pesticides, natural and synthetic hormones, and an assortment of antibiotics and prescription medications were also found.

A 2006 study found detectable concentrations of 28 pharmaceutical compounds in sewage treatment plant effluents, surface water, and sediment. The therapeutic classes included antibiotics, analgesics and anti-inflammatories, lipid regulators, beta-blockers, anti-convulsant, and steroid hormones. Although most chemical concentrations were detected at low levels (nano-grams/Liter (ng/L)), there are uncertainties that remain regarding the levels at which toxicity occurs and the risks of bioaccumulation of these pharmaceutical compounds.

=== Other ===
Besides the identified input from human medicine, there appears to be diffuse pollution from pharmaceuticals used in other areas such as agriculture. Investigations in Germany, France and Scotland showed traces of PPCPs upstream of waste water treatment plant effluents to rivers. The noPILLS report found that "the whole medicinal product chain needs to be considered for multi-point, targeted intervention".

== Effects ==
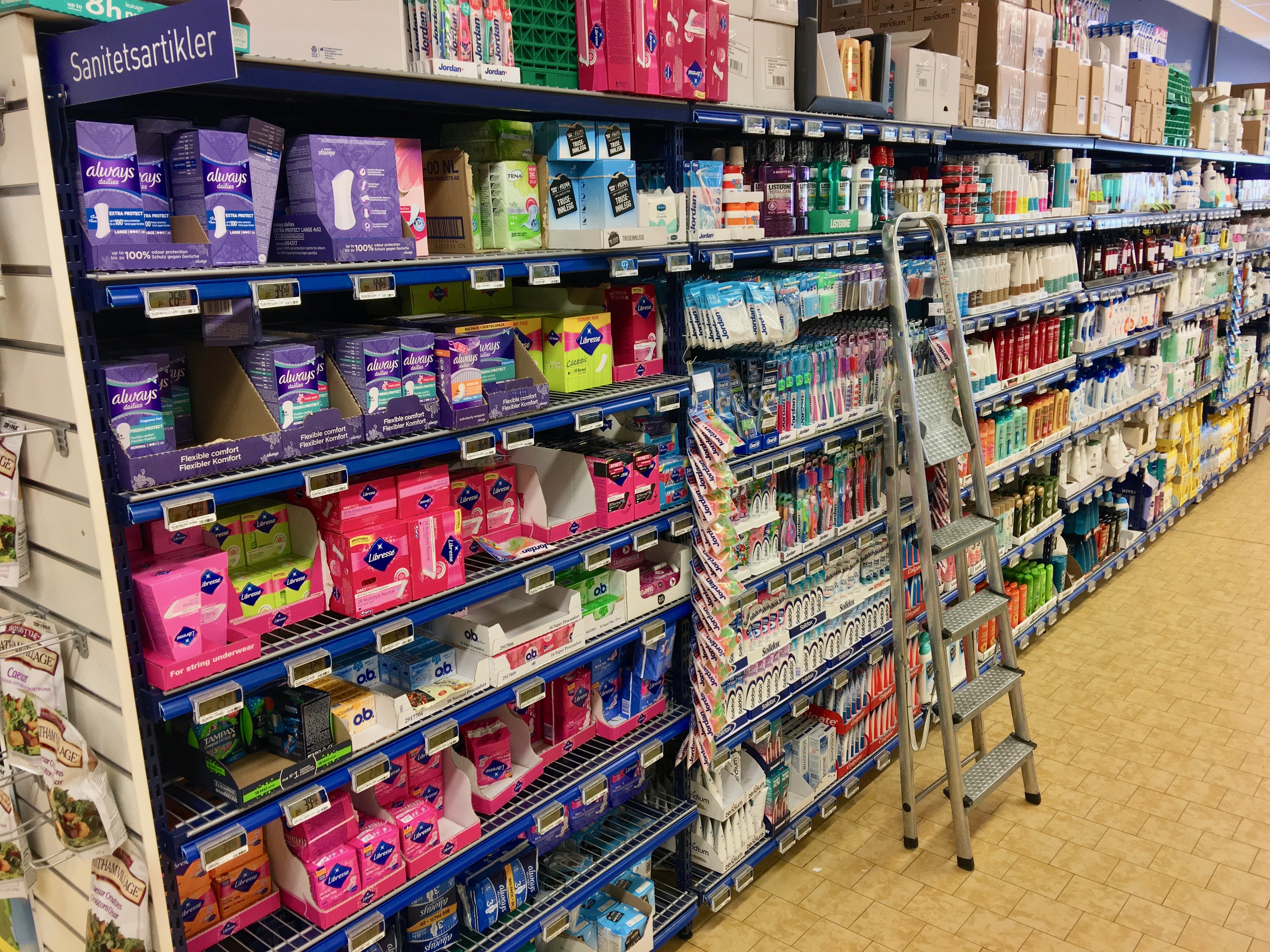
PPCPS: shelves with tampons, women's sanitary towels, tooth brushes, health and body care products

=== Human ===
The scope of human exposure to pharmaceutical and personal care products from the environment is a complex function of many factors. These factors include the concentrations, types, and distribution of pharmaceuticals in the environment; the pharmacokinetics of each drug; the structural transformation of the chemical compounds either through metabolism or natural degradation processes; and the potential bioaccumulation of the drugs. More research is needed to determine the effects on humans of long-term exposure to low levels of PPCPs. The full effects of mixtures of low concentrations of different PPCPs is also unknown.

"The U.S. EPA risk assessment states that the acceptable daily intake (ADI) of pharmaceuticals is around 0.0027 mg/kg‐day." Due to the lack of research of toxicity guidelines and their effects on human health it is difficult to determine a healthy dosage for water contaminated by pharmaceuticals. "The pharmaceutical sample size tested does not give a full representation of human exposure. Only 17 out of 3000 prescriptions are screened for in drinking water."

In addition, "The EPA and FDA regulations state that a drug or chemical is not considered harmful until clear evidence shows that a substance causes harm". This means that the U.S. is not testing or screening for thousands of potential contaminants in drinking water. Health risk assessments have not been conducted to provide concrete evidence to link pharmaceutical contamination and adverse human health effects.

"However, adverse health outcomes are displayed in aquatic organisms. Fish living near water treatment plants have been reported to be feminized." "Some male fish started to develop ovaries and other feminized characteristic due to pharmaceutical pollution, and some species have decreased in population due to exposure of EE2 and other hormonal ECD substances."

Although research has shown that PPCPs are present in water bodies throughout the world, no studies have shown a direct effect on human health. However, the absence of empirical data cannot rule out the possibility of adverse outcomes due to interactions or long-term exposures to these substances. Because the amounts of these chemicals in the water supply may be in the parts per trillion or parts per billion, it is difficult to chemically determine the exact amounts present. Many studies have therefore been focused on determining if the concentrations of these pharmaceuticals exist at or above the accepted daily intake (ADI) at which the designed biological outcomes can occur.

In addition to the growing concerns about human health risks from pharmaceutical drugs via environmental exposures, many researchers have speculated about the potential for inducing antibiotic resistance. One study found 10 different antibiotics in sewage treatment effluents, surface water, and sediments. Some microbiologists believe that if antibiotic concentrations are higher than the minimum inhibitory concentrations (MICs) of a species of pathogenic bacteria, a selective pressure would be exerted and, as a result, antibiotic resistance would be selectively promoted. It has also been demonstrated that at even sub-inhibitory concentrations (e.g., one-fourth of the MIC), several antibiotics are able to have an effect on gene expression (e.g., as shown for the modulation of expression of toxin-encoding genes in Staphylococcus aureus).

For reference the MIC of erythromycin that is effective against 90 percent of lab grown Campylobacter bacteria, the most common food-borne pathogen in the United States, is 60 ng/mL. One study found that the average concentration of erythromycin, a commonly prescribed antibiotic, was 0.09 ng/mL in water treatment plant effluents. Additionally, transfer of genetic elements among bacteria has been observed under natural conditions in wastewater treatment plants, and selection of resistant bacteria has been documented in sewers receiving wastewaters from pharmaceutical plants. Moreover, antibiotic resistant bacteria may also remain in sewage sludge and enter the food chain if the sludge is not incinerated but used as fertilizer on agricultural land.

The relationship between risk perception and behavior is multifaceted. Risk management is most effective once the motivation behind the behavior of disposing unused pharmaceuticals is understood. There was little correlation found between the perception of risk and knowledge regarding pharmaceutical waste according to a study conducted by Cook and Bellis in 2001. This study cautioned against the effectiveness of attempting to change the public's behavior on these health issues by warning them of the risks associated with their actions.

It is advised to take careful measures to inform the public in a way that does not impart guilt but rather public awareness. For example, a study carried out by Norlund and Garvill in Sweden (2003) that found that some people may make a personal sacrifice in terms of comfort because they feel that it would be helpful to reduce further environmental damage caused by the use of cars. Awareness of air pollution problems was a factor in their decision to take action on a more environmentally favorable choice of transportation. Thus, the goal of Bound's project encapsulates whether the perception of risk associated with pharmaceuticals has an effect on the way in which medication is commonly disposed.

In order to conduct this study, the pharmaceuticals were grouped by their therapeutic action in order to help participants identify them. The eight therapeutic groups are listed below: antibacterials, antidepressants, antihistamines, antiepileptics, hormone treatments, and lipid regulators. Next, a survey was created to examine the disposal patterns of the participants and their perception of the existing risk or threat against the environment. Respondents were asked the following questions in part one of the survey: 1. When and how they disposed of pharmaceuticals. 2. How they perceive the risk to the environment posed by pharmaceuticals. 3. To differentiate between the risks associated with different classed of pharmaceuticals. Part two of the survey involved each of the eight pharmaceutical groups described above individually. Finally, the third part asked information about the age, sex, profession, postcode, and education of participants. The sample size of participants was precise in comparison to the actual distribution of males and females in the UK: Sample- 54.8 percent were female and 45.2 percent male vs. Actual- the UK of 51.3 percent female to 48.7 percent male. Results showed that when a medication must be discarded, 63.2 percent of participants throw them in a bin, 21.8 percent return them to a pharmacist, and 11.5 percent dispose of them via the toilet/sink, while the remaining 3.5 percent keep them. Only half of the respondents felt like pharmaceuticals could potentially be harmful to the environment. Upon examination of factors relevant to risk perception, there was no definite link found between perception and education or income.

Dr. Bound noted that participation in altruistic activities such as Environmental Conservation groups may provide members with the ability to better grasp the effects of their actions in the environment. In regards to the aquatic environment, it is hard for one to perceive the favorable effects of properly disposing medication. There also exists the plausibility that a person's behavior will only be affected if there is a severe risk to themselves or humans as opposed to an environmental threat. Even though there are serious threats of pharmaceutical pollution resulting in the feminization of certain fish, they have a lower priority because they are not easily understood or experienced by the general public. In Jonathan P. Bound's opinion, the provision of information about exactly how to go about disposing unused medication properly in conjunction with risk education may have a more positive and forceful effect.

=== Recommendations ===
Several recommendations and initiatives have been made to prevent pharmaceutical pollution in the environment. Important practices include:

- educating patients on the importance of proper unused drug disposal,
- educating physicians and patients of proper drug disposal,
- encouraging pharmaceutical industries to implement strategies for proper disposal of drugs or recycling strategies, and
- requiring hospitals to implement better management practices for disposing pharmaceutical waste.

First, it is imperative that patients become educated on pharmaceutical pollution and its hazardous effects on humans, animals, and the overall environment. By educating patients on proper disposal of unused drugs, steps are being taken to further prevent pharmaceutical waste in the environment. Consumers should take precautions before tossing out drugs in the trash or flushing them down the toilet. Community take-back programs have been set up for consumers to bring back unused drugs for proper disposal. Another initiative is for pharmacies to serve as a take-back site for proper drug disposal such as implementing recycling bins for customers to bring back unused or expired medicines while they're shopping. In addition, medical foundations could receive these medicines to administer them to people who need them, while destroying those that are in excess or expired. Furthermore, educating physicians and patients on the importance of proper drug disposal and the environmental concern will help further reduce pharmaceutical waste.

Also, implementing initiatives for hospitals to focus on better practices for hazardous waste disposal may prove to be beneficial. The US EPA encourages hospitals to develop efficient pharmaceutical disposal practices by giving them grants. This incentive may be very beneficial to other hospitals worldwide.

Additionally, "It is critical for us to develop an analytical method of identifying, testing, and regulating the amount of pharmaceuticals in the water systems". Data must be collected in order to accurately measure the prevalence of pharmaceuticals in drinking water. "Multiple Health risk assessments should be conducted to understand the effects of prolonged exposure to pharmaceuticals in drinking water".

Community-based programs should be developed to monitor exposure and health outcomes. We should encourage the pharmaceutical industry to develop technology that extracts pharmaceuticals from waterways. "Extensive research must be conducted to determine the amount of pharmaceutical contamination in the environment and its effects on animals and marine life".

Many pharmaceuticals pass through the human body unchanged, so there are advantages when human excreta does not go into waterways, even after conventional sewage treatment, which also does not remove most of these chemicals. It is therefore preferable for human feces and urine to go into fertile soil, where they will receive more effective treatment by numerous microbes found there, over longer amounts of time, and stay away from waterways. This can be achieved via the use of urine-diverting dry toilets, composting toilets, and Arborloos.

=== Environmental ===
While the full effects of most PPCPs on the environment are not understood, there is concern about the potential they have for harm because they may act unpredictably when mixed with other chemicals from the environment or concentrate in the food chain. Additionally, some PPCPs are active at very low concentrations, and are often released continuously in large or widespread quantities.

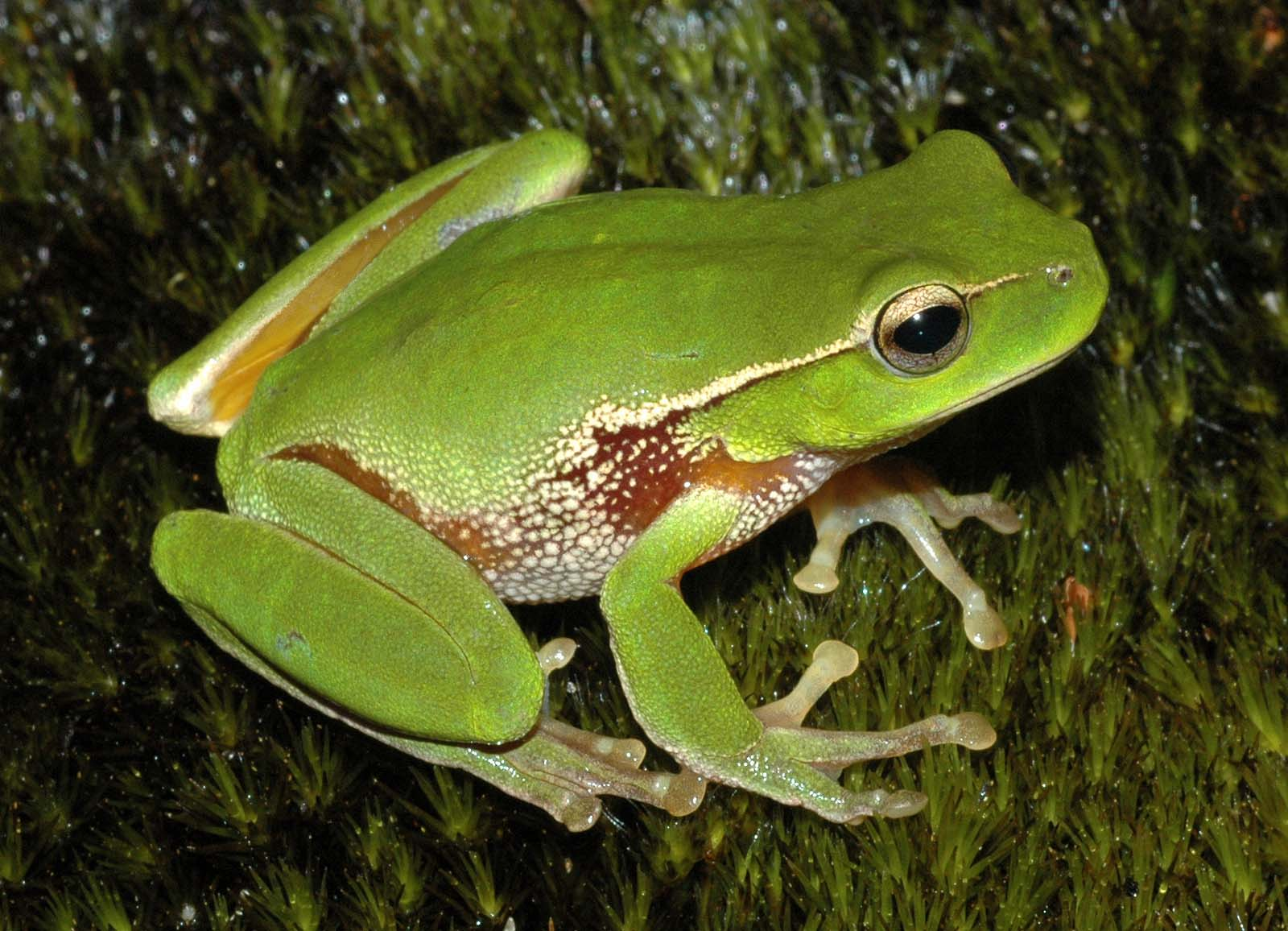
A class of antidepressants may be found in frogs and can significantly slow their development.

Because of the high solubility of most PPCPs, aquatic organisms are especially vulnerable to their effects. Researchers have found that a class of antidepressants may be found in frogs and can significantly slow their development. The increased presence of estrogen and other synthetic hormones in waste water due to birth control and hormonal therapies has been linked to increased feminization of exposed fish and other aquatic organisms. The chemicals within these PPCP products could either affect the feminization or masculinization of different fishes, therefore affecting their reproductive rates.

In addition to being found only in waterways, the ingredients of some PPCPs can also be found in the soil. Since some of these substances take a long time or cannot be degraded biologically, they make their way up the food chain. Information pertaining to the transport and fate of these hormones and their metabolites in dairy waste disposal is still being investigated, yet research suggest that the land application of solid wastes is likely linked with more hormone contamination problems. Not only does the pollution from PPCPs affect marine ecosystems, but also those habitats that depend on this polluted water.

There are various concerns about the effects of pharmaceuticals found in surface waters and specifically the threats against rainbow trout exposed to treated sewage effluents. Analysis of these pharmaceuticals in the blood plasma of fish compared to human therapeutic plasma levels have yielded vital information providing a means of assessing risk associated with medication waste in water.

Rainbow trout were exposed to undiluted, treated sewage water at three different sites in Sweden. They were exposed for a total of 14 days while 25 pharmaceuticals were measured in the blood plasma at different levels for analysis. The progestin Levonorgestrel was detected in fish blood plasma at concentrations between 8.5 and 12 ng mL-1 which exceed the human therapeutic plasma level. The measured effluent level of Levonorgestrel in the three areas was shown to reduce the fertility of the rainbow trout.

The three sites chosen for field exposures were in located in Stockholm, Gothenburg, and Umeå. They were chosen according to their varying degrees of treatment technologies, geographic locations, and size. The effluent treatment includes active sludge treatment, nitrogen and phosphorus removal (except in Umeå), primary clarification, and secondary clarification. Juvenile rainbow trout were procured from Antens fiskodling AB, Sweden and Umlax AB, Sweden. The fish were exposed to aerated, undiluted, treated effluent. Since all of the sites underwent sludge treatment, it can be inferred that they are not representative of the low end of treatment efficacy. Of the 21 pharmaceuticals that were detected in the water samples, 18 were identified in the effluent, 17 in the plasma portion, and 14 pharmaceuticals were found in both effluent and plasma.

== Current research ==
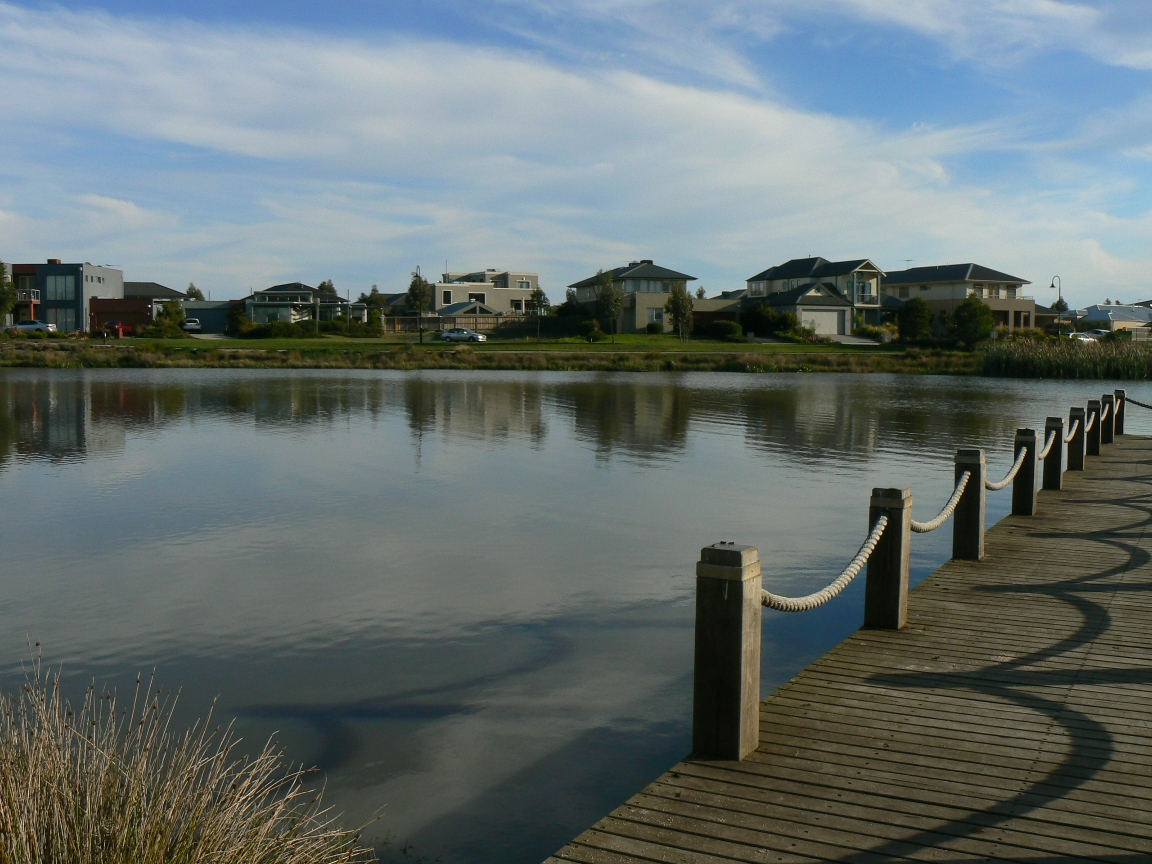
There are traces pharmaceuticals in waterways that have an adverse effect on the environment.

Starting in the mid-1960s, ecologists and toxicologists began to express concern about the potential adverse effects of pharmaceuticals in the water supply, but it wasn't until a decade later that the presence of pharmaceuticals in water was well documented. Studies in 1975 and 1977 found clofibric acid and salicylic acids at trace concentrations in treated water. Widespread concern about and research into the effect of PPCPs largely started in the early 1990s. Until this time, PPCPs were largely ignored because of their relative solubility and containment in waterways compared to more familiar pollutants like agrochemicals, industrial chemicals, and industrial waste and byproducts.

Since then, a great deal of attention has been directed to the ecological and physiological risk associated with pharmaceutical compounds and their metabolites in water and the environment. In the last decade, most research in this area has focused on steroid hormones and antibiotics. There is concern that steroid hormones may act as endocrine disruptors. Some research suggests that concentrations of ethinylestradiol, an estrogen used in oral contraceptive medications and one of the most commonly prescribed pharmaceuticals, can cause endocrine disruption in aquatic and amphibian wildlife in concentrations as low as 1 ng/L.

Current research on PPCPs aims to answer these questions:

- What is the effect of exposure to low levels of PPCPs over time?
- What is the effect of exposure to mixtures of chemicals?
- Are the effects acute (short-term) or chronic (long-term)?
- Are certain populations, such as the elderly, very young, or immuno-compromised, more vulnerable to the effects of these compounds?
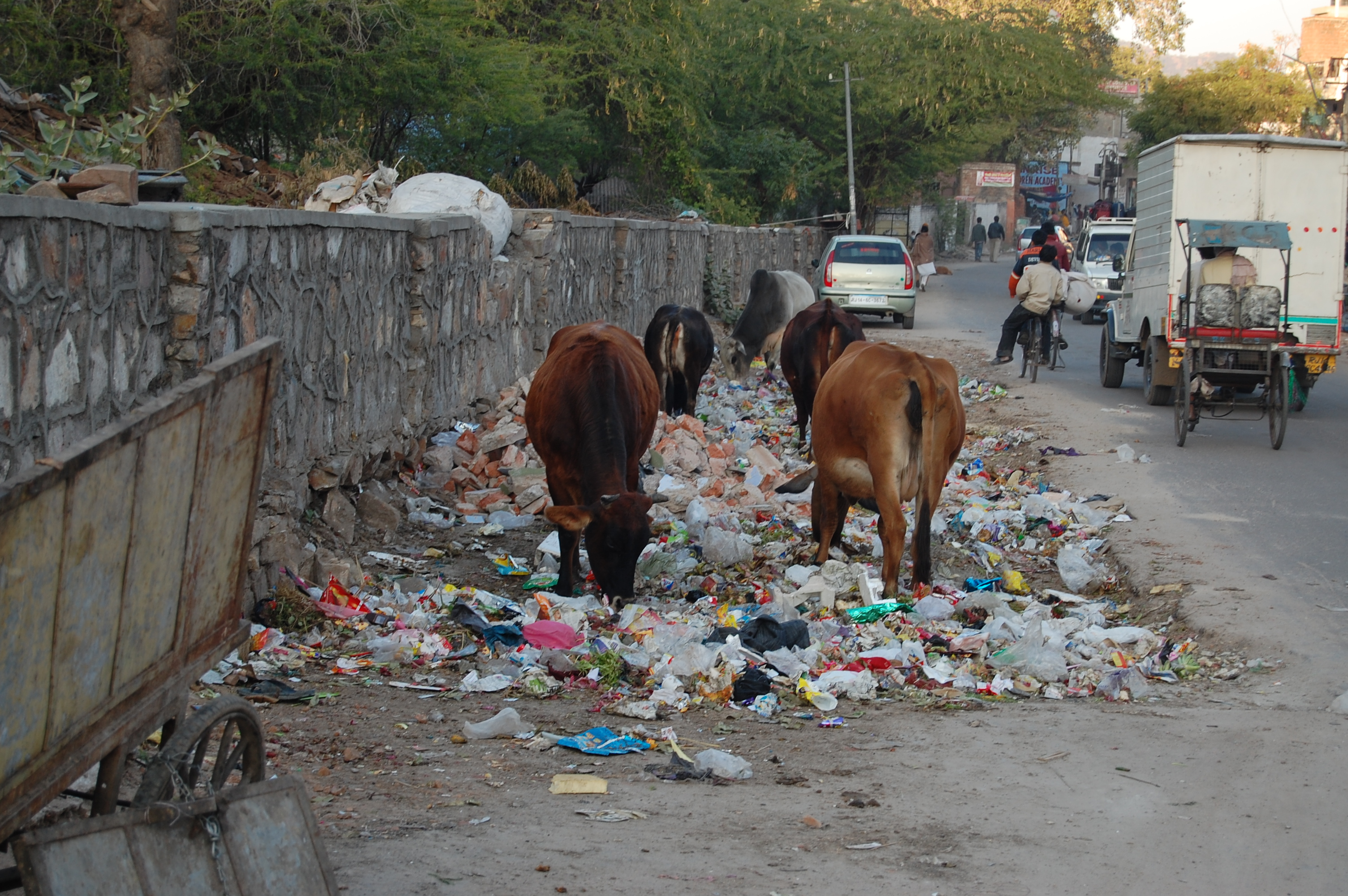
- Jaipur cows eating trash, which may contain medicines and supplements that will pass through their system and enter the environment
  What is the effect of PPCPs on bacterial, fungal, and aquatic life?
- Are the levels of antibiotics in the aquatic environment sufficient to promote antibiotic resistance?
- What is the effect of exposure to steroid hormones on animal and human populations?

=== Pharmacoenvironmentology ===
Pharmacoenvironmentology is an extension of pharmacovigilance as it deals specifically with the environmental and ecological effects of drugs given at therapeutic doses. Pharmacologists with this particular expertise (known as a pharmacoenvironmentologist) become a necessary component of any team assessing different aspects of drug safety in the environment. We must look at the effects of drugs not only in medical practice, but also at its environmental effects. Any good clinical trial should look at the impact of particular drugs on the environment. Things we need to address in pharmacoenvironmentology are drugs and their exact concentration in different parts of the environment.

Pharmacoenvironmentology is a specific domain of pharmacology and not of environmental studies. This is because it deals with drugs entering through living organisms through elimination.

=== Ecopharmacovigilance ===
Pharmacovigilance is a new branch of science, which was born in 1960 after the incidence of the thalidomide disaster. Thalidomide is a teratogen and caused horrific birth abnormalities. The thalidomide disaster lead to the present day approach to drug safety and adverse event reporting.

According to the EPA, pharamacovigilance is science aiming to capture any adverse effects of pharmaceuticals in humans after use. However, ecopharmacovigilance is the science, and activities concerning detection, assessment, understanding, and prevention of adverse effects of pharmaceuticals in the environment which affect humans and other animal species. There has been a growing focus among scientists about the impact of drugs on the environment. In recent years, we have been able to see human pharmaceuticals that are being detected in the environment which most are typically found on surface water.

The importance of ecopharmacovigilance lies in monitoring adverse effects of pharmaceuticals on humans through environmental exposure. Because it is a relatively new field of science, researchers are continuously developing and understanding the impacts of pharmaceuticals in the environment and the risks they pose to human and animal exposure. Environmental risk assessment is a regulatory requirement for the launch of any new drug. This precaution has become a necessary step towards the understanding and prevention of adverse effects of pharmaceutical residue in the environment. Pharmaceuticals usually enter the environment from the excretion of drugs after human use, hospital wastes, and improper disposal of unused drugs from patients.

=== Ecopharmacology ===
Ecopharmacology concerns the entry of chemicals or drugs into the environment through any route and at any concentration disturbing the balance of ecology (ecosystem), as a consequence. Ecopharmacology is a broad term that includes studies of "PPCPs" irrespective of doses and route of entry into environment.

The geology of a karst aquifer area assists with the movement of PPCPs from the surface to the ground water. Relatively soluble bedrock creates sinkholes, caves and sinking streams into which surface water easily flows, with minimal filtering. Since 25% of the population get their drinking water from karst aquifers, this affects a large number of people. A 2016 study of karst aquifers in southwest Illinois found that 89% of water samples had one or more PPCP measured. Triclocarban (an antimicrobial) was the most frequently detected PPCP, with gemfibrozil (a cardiovascular drug) the second most frequently detected. Other PPCPs detected were trimethoprim, naproxen, carbamazepine, caffeine, sulfamethoxazole, and fluoxetine. The data suggests that septic tank effluent is a probable source of PPCPs.

=== Fate of pharmaceuticals in sewage treatment plants ===
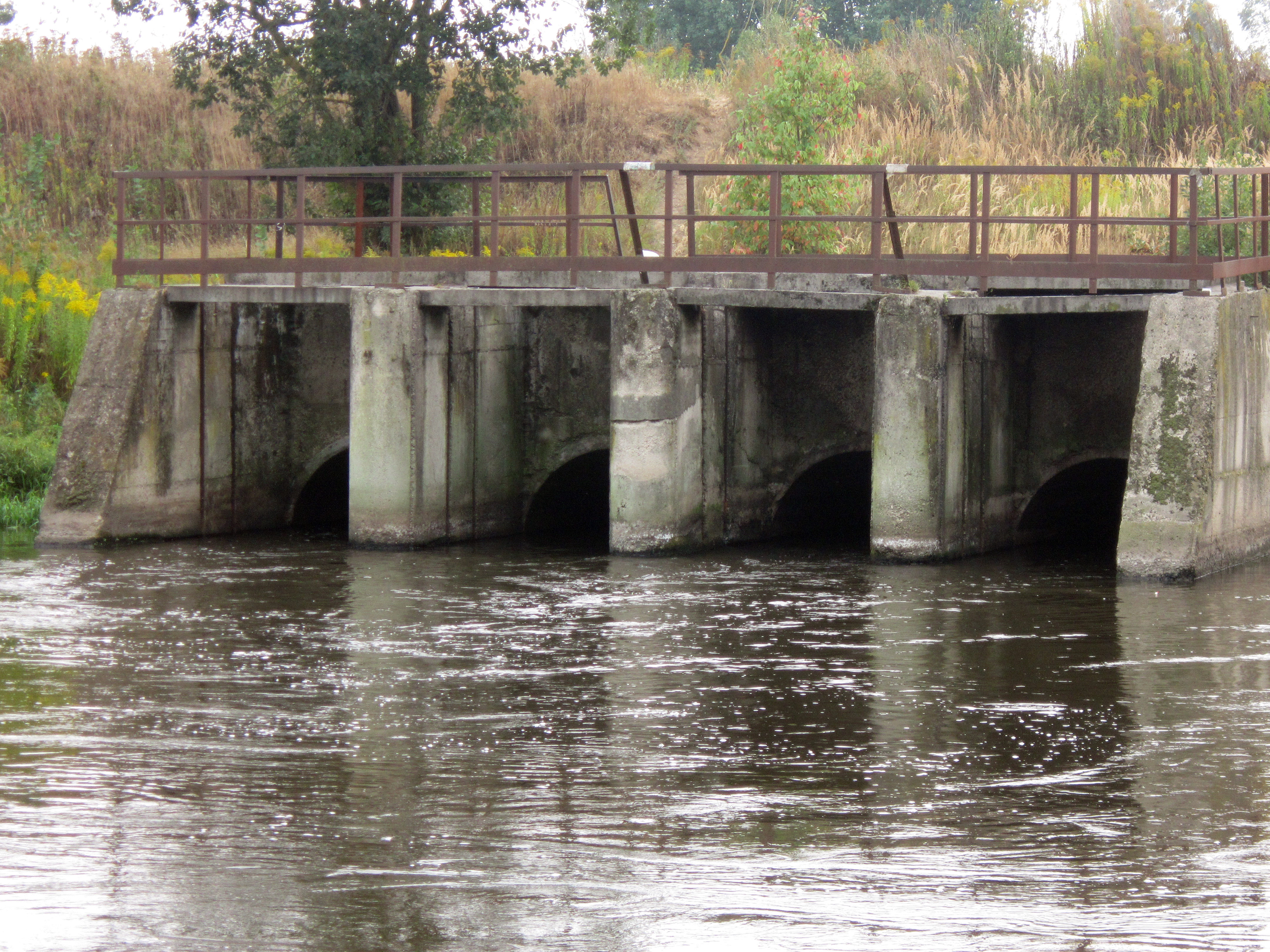
Sewage treatment plants use physical, chemical, and biological processes to remove nutrients and contaminants from waste water.

Sewage treatment plants (STP) work with physical, chemical, and biological processes to remove nutrients and contaminants from waste water. Usually the STP is equipped with an initial mechanical separation of solid particles (cotton buds, cloth, hygiene articles etc.) appearing in the incoming water. Following this there may be filters separating finer particles either occurring in the incoming water or developing as a consequence of chemical treatment of the water with flocculating agents.

Many STPs also include one or several steps of biological treatment. By stimulating the activity of various strains of microorganisms physically their activity may be promoted to degrade the organic content of the sewage by up to 90% or more. In certain cases more advanced techniques are used as well. The today most commonly used advanced treatment steps especially in terms of micropollutants are

- membranes (which may be used instead of the biological treatment),
- ozonation,
- activated carbon (powdered or granulated),
- UV treatment,
- treatment with potassium ferrate and
- sand filtration (which is sometimes added as a last step after the aforementioned).

PPCPs are difficult to remove from wastewater with conventional methods. Some research shows the concentration of such substances is even higher in water leaving the plant than water entering the plant. Many factors including environmental pH, seasonal variation, and biological properties affect the ability of an STP to remove PPCPs.

A 2013 study of a drinking water treatment plant found that of 30 PPCPs measured at both the source water and the drinking water locations, 76% of PPCPs were removed, on average, in the water treatment plant. Ozonation was found to be an efficient treatment process for the removal of many PPCPs. However, there are some PPCPs that were not removed, such as DEET used as mosquito spray, nonylphenol which is a surfactant used in detergents, the antibiotic erythromycin, and the herbicide atrazine. Recent computational studies have also examined emerging two-dimensional materials such as Si₂BN nanoflakes for the adsorption and detection of persistent pharmaceutical pollutants, including carbamazepine.

Several research projects are running to optimize the use of advanced sewage treatment techniques under different conditions. The advanced techniques will increase the costs for the sewage treatment substantially. In a European cooperation project between 2008 and 2012 in comparison four hospital waste water treatment facilities were developed in Switzerland, Germany, The Netherlands and Luxembourg to investigate the elimination rates of concentrated waste water with pharmaceutical "cocktails" by using different and combined advanced treatment technologies. Especially the German STP at Marienhospital Gelsenkirchen showed the effects of a combination of membranes, ozone, powdered activated carbon and sand filtration. But even a maximum of installed technologies could not eliminate 100% of all substances and especially radiocontrast agents are nearly impossible to eliminate. The investigations showed that depending on the installed technologies the treatment costs for such a hospital treatment facility may be up to €5.50 per m^{3}. Other studies and comparisons expect the treatment costs to increase up to 10%, mainly due to energy demand. It is therefore important to define best available technique before extensive infrastructure investments are introduced on a wide basis.

The fate of incoming pharmaceutical residues in the STP is unpredictable. Some substances seem to be more or less eliminated, while others pass the different steps in the STP unaffected. There is no systematic knowledge at hand to predict how and why this happens.

Pharmaceutical residues that have been conjugated (bound to a bile acid) before being excreted from the patients may undergo de-conjugation in the STP, yielding higher levels of free pharmaceutical substance in the outlet from the STP than in its incoming water. Some pharmaceuticals with large sales volumes have not been detected in the incoming water to the STP, indicating that complete metabolism and degradation must have occurred already in the patient or during the transport of sewage from the household to the STP.

== Regulation ==
=== United States ===
In the United States, EPA has published wastewater regulations for pharmaceutical manufacturing plants. EPA has also issued air pollution regulations for manufacturing facilities.

In 2009 the agency studied disposal practices for health care facilities where unused pharmaceuticals might be flushed (i.e. discharged to an STP or a water body) rather than placed in solid waste, but did not develop wastewater regulations.

There are no national regulations covering disposal by consumers to sewage treatment plants (i.e., disposed down the drain). To address pharmaceuticals that may be present in drinking water, in 2009 EPA added three birth control substances and one antibiotic to its Contaminant Candidate List (CCL 3) for possible regulation under the Safe Drinking Water Act.

EPA published regulations for hazardous waste disposal of pharmaceuticals by health care facilities in 2019.

In 2019, the United States Virgin Islands banned coral damaging sunscreens, in a growing trend to try to protect coral reefs.

== Examples ==
=== Blister packs ===
80% of pills in the world are packed with blister packaging, which is the most convenient type for several reasons. Blister packs have two main components, the "lid" and the "blister" (cavity). Lid is mainly manufactured with aluminum (Al) and paper. The Cavity consists of polyvinyl chloride (PVC), polypropylene (PP), polyester (PET) or aluminum (Al). If users employ proper disposal methods, all these materials can be recycled and the harmful effects to the environment can be minimized. However, a problem arises with the improper disposal either by burning or disposing as normal household waste.

Burning of blister packs directly causes air pollution by the combustion products of polypropylene ([C_{3}H_{6}]_{n}), polyester ([C_{10}H_{8}O_{4}]_{n}), and polyvinyl chloride ([CH_{2}CHCl]_{n}). The combustion reactions and products of these chemicals are mentioned below.

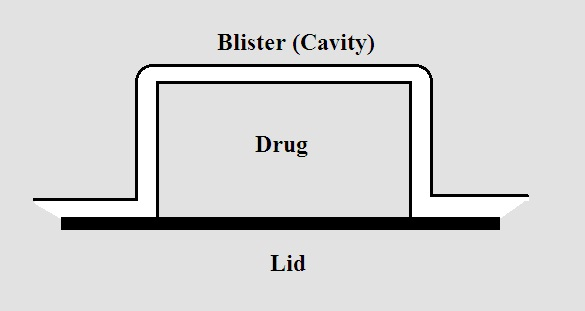
The basic configuration of blister packaging

[C_{3}H_{6}]_{n} + 9n/2 O_{2} → 3n CO_{2} +3n H_{2}O

[C_{10}H_{8}O_{4}]_{n} + 10n O_{2} → 10n CO_{2} +4n H_{2}O

[CH_{2}CHCl]_{n} + 2n O_{2} → n CO_{2} + n H_{2}O + n HCl + n CO

Even though polypropylene and polyester is harmful to the environment, the most toxic effect is due to the combustion of polyvinyl chloride since it produces hydrochloric acid (HCl) which is an irritant in the lower and upper respiratory tract that can cause adverse effects to human beings.

The disposal of blister packs as normal waste, will forbid recycling process and eventually accumulate in soil or water, which will result soil and water pollution since bio-degradation processes of compounds like PVC, PP and PET are very slow. As a result, ecologically damaging effects like disturbances of the habitats and movements can be seen. Ingestion by the animals, affect the secretion of gastric enzymes and steroid hormones that can decrease the feeding stimuli and may also cause problems in reproduction. At low pH, aluminum can increase its solubility according to the following equation. As a result, the negative effects of both aquatic and terrestrial ecosystems can be generated.

2Al_{(s)}+ 6H^{+} → 2Al^{3+} _{(aq)} + 3H_{2} _{(g)}

By employing proper disposal methods, all manufacturing materials of blister packs like PP, PE, PVC and Al can be recycled and the adverse effects to the environment can be minimized. Even though, the synthesis of these polymers relatively simple, the recycling process can be very complex since the blister packs contain metals and polymers together.

As the first step of recycling, separation of Al and Polymers using the hydrometallurgical method which uses hydrochloric acid (HCl) can be incorporated. Then PVC can be recycled by using mechanical or chemical methods. The most recent trend is to use biodegradable, eco-friendly "bio plastics" which are also called as biopolymers such as derivatives of starch, cellulose, protein, chitin and xylan for pharmaceutical packaging, to reduce the hostile effects to the environment.

=== Nail polish ===
In nail salons, employees can be exposed to dozens of chemicals found in nail polish and nail polish removers. Nail polishes have many ingredients which are considered toxic, including solvents, resins, colorants and pigments, among others. In the early 2000s some of the toxic components found in nail polish (toluene, formaldehyde and dibutyl phthalate) started being replaced by other substances. One of the new components was triphenyl phosphate which is known as an endocrine-disrupting plasticizer. Now many labels are available including not only 3-Free but higher, for example 5-Free or 12-Free. Studies on the possible health outcomes of nail polish exposures identify risks such as skin problems, respiratory disorders, neurologic disorders, and reproductive disorders.

=== Nail polish remover ===
Nail polish remover has the ability to enter bodies of water and soil after entering landfills or by precipitation, such as rain or snow. However, due to acetone's high volatility, most of it that enters the bodies of water and soil will evaporate again and re-enter the atmosphere. Not all of the acetone molecules will evaporate again, and so, when acetone remains in the bodies of water or soil, a reaction will occur. Nail polish remover evaporates easily because acetone's intermolecular forces are weak. An acetone molecule can't attract other acetone molecules easily because its hydrogens are not slightly positive. The only force that holds acetone molecules together is its permanent dipoles which are weaker than hydrogen bonds.

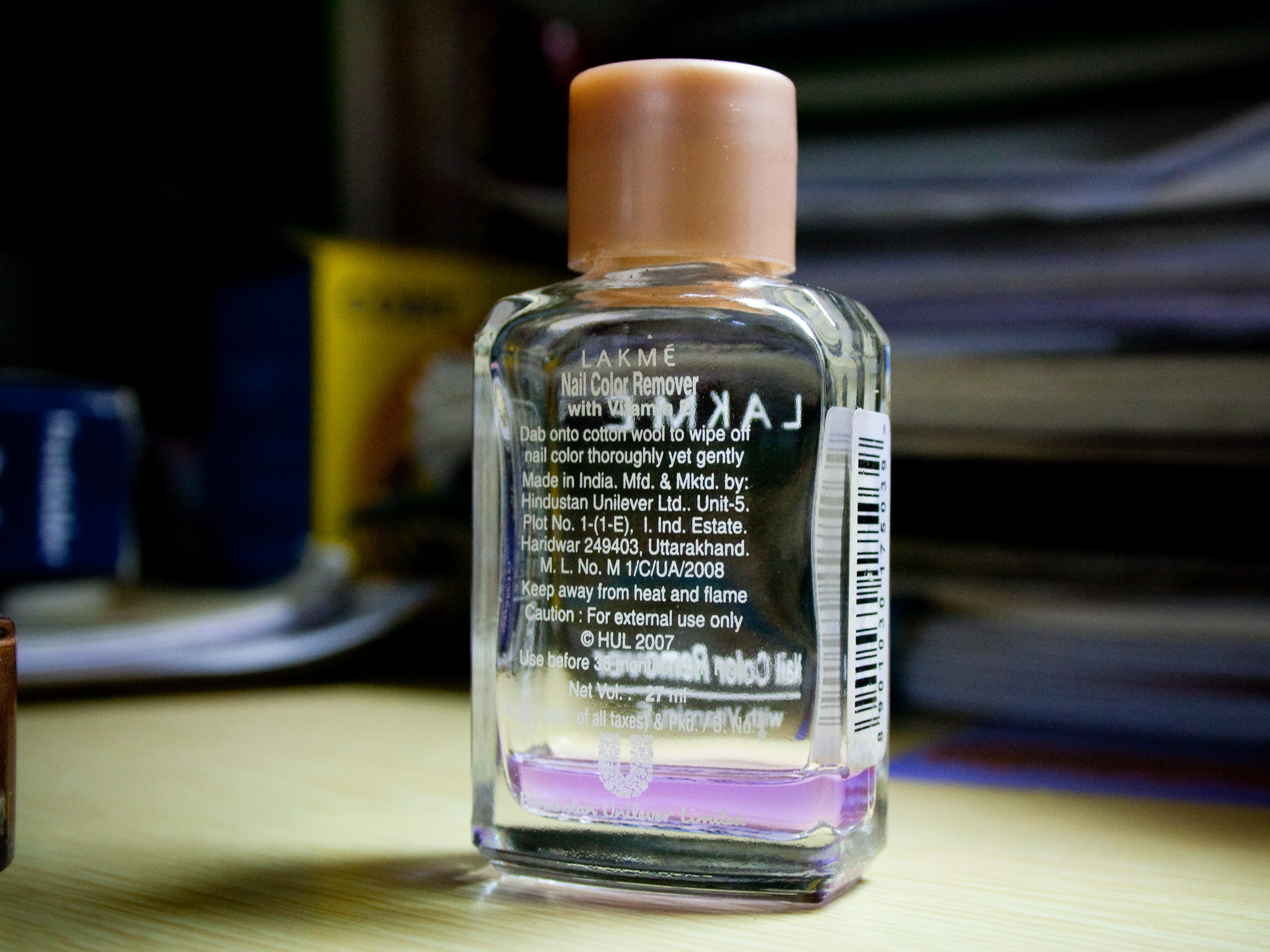
Nail polish remover contains acetone.

Since nail polish remover is a solvent, it will dissolve in water. When acetone dissolves in water, it hydrogen bonds with water. The more nail polish remover that enters the hydrosphere will increase the concentration of acetone and then increase the concentration of the solution created when acetone and water bonds. If enough nail polish remover is disposed, it can reach the lethal dose level for aquatic life.

Nail polish remover can also enter the lithosphere by landfills and by precipitation. However, it will not bind to the soil. Microorganisms in the soil will decompose acetone. The consequence of microorganisms decomposing acetone is the risk it has to cause oxygen depletion in bodies of water. The more acetone readily available for microorganism decomposition leads to more microorganisms reproduced and thus oxygen depletion because more microorganisms use up the available oxygen.

When nail polish remover evaporates, acetone enters the atmosphere in the gaseous phase. In the gaseous phase, acetone can undergo photolysis and breakdown into carbon monoxide, methane, and ethane. When temperatures are between 100 - 350 degrees Celsius, the following mechanism occurs:

(CH_{3})2CO + hv → CH_{3} + CH_{3}CO

CH_{3}CO → CH_{3}+ CO

CH_{3}+ (CH_{3})2CO → CH_{4} + CH_{2}COCH_{3}

2CH_{3} → C_{2}H_{6}

A second pathway that nail polish remover can enter in the atmosphere is reacting with hydroxyl radicals. When acetone reacts with hydroxyl radicals, its main product is methylglyoxal. Methylglyoxal is an organic compound that is a by-product of many metabolic pathways. It is an intermediate precursor for many advanced glycation end-products, that are formed for diseases such as diabetes or neurodegenerative diseases. The following reaction occurs:

(CH_{3})2CO + ·OH → CH_{3}C(O)OH + ·CH_{3}

CH_{3}C(O)OH + ·CH_{3}→ CH_{3}C(O)COH + 3H^{+}

=== Sunscreens ===
Sunscreens use a variety of chemical compounds to prevent UV radiation, like benzophenone, octocrylene, octinoxate, among others. These chemical compounds affect the life of coral reefs in different stages of their life and contributes to coral bleaching.

== Pending questions ==
- Is there a temperature at which PPCPs are burned and destroyed? Would they thus be eliminated when materials are made into biochar?
- Are there artificial colorings that degrade under similar conditions to PPCPs and could be used as proxies in low-tech experiments of how to eliminate PPCPs?
- Ultraviolet light is known to degrade PPCPs. How long would urine need to lay in the sun in transparent bottles to destroy the PPCPs before its use as fertilizer?
- Do soil microbes develop or evolve the ability to break down PPCPs over time? If a person who consumes a pharmaceutical uses a urine-diverting dry toilet, in which the urine is dispersed into fertile soil among plants, would the microbes eventually decompose this chemical entirely? After how much time? Which types of pharmaceuticals would break down faster and which slower?
- Are there types of PPCPs that cannot enter into the roots of plants because their molecules are simply too large?
- When essential oils are extracted from plants, would PPCPs pass into them, stay in the cauldron, or be destroyed by the heat?

== See also ==
- Drug pollution
- Plastic particle water pollution
- Environmental impact of silver nanoparticles
- Environmental persistent pharmaceutical pollutant
- Water pollution
- Micropollutant
