= Strategic Approach to International Chemicals Management =

SAICM
- Strategic Approach to International Chemicals Management
- Abbreviation: SAICM
- Formation: 6 February 2006
- Type: Policy Framework
- Official language: English, Arabic, Chinese, French, Russian, Spanish
- Website: www.saicm.org

The Strategic Approach to International Chemicals Management (SAICM) is a global policy framework to foster the sound management of chemicals. The SAICM Secretariat is hosted by the United Nations Environment Programme.

"The sound management of chemicals is essential if we are to achieve sustainable development, including the eradication of poverty and disease, the improvement of human health and the environment and the elevation and maintenance of the standard of living in countries at all levels of development." - Dubai, 2006

It was adopted by the International Conference on Chemicals Management in Dubai, United Arab Emirates, on 6 February 2006. The first session of the Conference and the process to develop the Strategic Approach to International Chemicals Management were co-convened by the United Nations Environment Programme (UN Environment), the Inter-Organization Programme for the Sound Management of Chemicals (IOMC) and the Intergovernmental Forum on Chemical Safety (IFCS).

The Strategic Approach supports the achievement of the goal agreed at the 2002 Johannesburg World Summit on Sustainable Development of ensuring that, by the year 2020, chemicals will be produced and used in ways that minimize significant adverse impacts on the environment and human health. It acknowledges the essential contributions of chemicals in the current societies and economies, while recognizing the potential threat to sustainable development if chemicals are not managed soundly.

(As of 12 June 2015) The Strategic Approach focal points include 175 Governments, 85 NGOs, including a broad range of representatives from industry and civil society.

== Overarching Policy Strategy ==
SAICM commitments are expressed through the Dubai Declaration, Overarching Policy Strategy and the Global Plan of Action.

=== Scope ===
The Strategic Approach has a scope that includes:

a. Environmental, economic, social, health and labour aspects of chemical safety,

b. Agricultural and industrial chemicals, with a view to promoting sustainable development and covering chemicals at all stages of their life-cycle, including in products.

=== Objectives ===
The main objectives of the Strategic Approach are:

A. Risk reduction

B. Knowledge and information

C. Governance

D. Capacity-building and technical cooperation

E. Illegal international traffic

== Quick Start Programme ==
The Quick Start Programme (QSP) is a programme under SAICM to support initial enabling capacity building and implementation activities in developing countries, least developed countries, small island developing States and countries with economies in transition. The QSP includes a voluntary, time-limited trust fund, administered by the United Nations Environment Programme, and multilateral, bilateral and other forms of cooperation. The QSP Trust Fund portfolio includes 184 approved projects in 108 countries, of which 54 are Least Developed Countries or Small Island Developing States, for an approximate funding $37 million.

== International Conference on Chemicals Management ==
The International Conference on Chemicals Management (ICCM) undertakes periodic reviews of SAICM. The first session (ICCM 1) was held in Dubai, United Arab Emirates, from 4–6 February 2006, finalized and adopted SAICM.

The second session (ICCM 2) was held in Geneva, Switzerland, on 11–15 May 2009 and undertook the first periodic review of SAICM's implementation.

The third session (ICCM 3) was held in Nairobi, Kenya, 17–21 September 2012 and reviewed progress in the implementation of SAICM with tangible data on 20 indicators of progress adopted at ICCM2, addressed emerging policy issues and adopted the Health Sector Strategy.

The fourth session (ICCM 4) was held in Geneva, Switzerland, from 28 September to 2 October 2015. The overall orientation and guidance towards the achievement of the 2020 goal is the strategic policy outcome of ICCM4, setting the stage for action in 2020. ICCM4 also reviewed implementation aspects of emerging policy issues and other issues of concern, considered the Sustainable Development Goals, discussed sound management of chemicals and waste beyond 2020, and reviewed the proposed activities.

ICCM4, through resolution IV/4, initiated an inter-sessional process to prepare recommendations regarding the Strategic Approach and the sound management of chemicals and waste beyond 2020. The First meeting of the intersessional process considering the Strategic Approach and the sound management of chemicals and waste beyond 2020 was held in Brasilia, Brazil, from 7 to 9 February 2017.

The fifth session of the International Conference on Chemicals Management is scheduled to be held in Bonn, Germany, on 25 - 29 September 2023.

== Emerging Policy Issues and Other Issues of Concern ==
The ICCM provides a platform to call for appropriate action on emerging policy issues (EPI) as they arise and to forge consensus on priorities for cooperative action. So far, resolutions have been adopted on the following issues:

A. Lead in paint

B. Chemicals in products

C. Hazardous substance within the life cycle of electrical and electronic products

D. Nanotechnology and manufactured nanomaterials

E. Endocrine-disrupting chemicals

F. Environmentally Persistent Pharmaceutical Pollutants

Other issues of concern have been acknowledged:

G. Perfluorinated chemicals

H. Highly Hazardous Pesticides
