= List of abbreviations used in sanitation =

List of abbreviations and acronyms commonly used in the sanitation sector

This is a list of abbreviations and acronyms commonly used in the sanitation sector or more broadly in the WASH sector.

== A ==
- AA - Activated alumina
- ADB - Asian Development Bank
- ABR - Anaerobic baffled reactor - improved septic tank with baffles, see also Anaerobic digestion and DEWATS
- ACP - Anaerobic contact process
- AD - Anaerobic digestion
- AF - Anaerobic filters, see also Anaerobic digestion
- AfDB - African Development Bank
- AfWA - African Water Association
- AIT - Asian Institute of Technology in Bangkok, Thailand
- aka or a.k.a. - "also known as"
- AMCOW - African Ministers Council on Water
- As - Arsenic
- ATS - Aerobic treatment system
- AusAID - Australian Agency for International Development
- AWF - African Water Facility, an initiative of the African Ministers’ Council on Water (AMCOW), hosted and administered by African Development Bank (AfDB)

== B ==
- BCC - Behavioral change communication
- BMGF - Bill and Melinda Gates Foundation
- BMZ - Federal Ministry for Economic Cooperation and Development
- BOD or BOD5 - Biological oxygen demand (measured for five days)
- BOP or BoP - Bottom of the pyramid (or base of the pyramid)
- BOT - Build-operate-transfer
- BSF - Black soldier fly or Biosand filter
- BSFL - Black soldier fly larvae

== C ==
- cap - capita, as per capita (or per person)
- CAPEX - Capital expenditure
- CATS - Community approaches to total sanitation, a term coined by UNICEF
- CBO - Community-based organization
- CBOD - Carbonaceous biochemical oxygen demand
- CBS - Container-based sanitation
- CCT - Conditional cash transfer
- CHC - Community Health Clubs
- CHP - Combined heat and power
- CLTS - Community-led total sanitation
- CLUES - Community Led Urban Environmental Sanitation
- CFU - Colony-forming unit
- COD - Controlled open defecation
- COD - Chemical oxygen demand
- CoP - Community of practice
- CP - Contact precipitation, see precipitation
- CSO - Combined sewer overflow or Civil Society Organization (same as Non-governmental organization)
- CSR - Corporate social responsibility
- CW - Constructed wetland

== D ==
- DALY - Disability-adjusted life year
- DEWATS - Decentralized wastewater treatment system
- DFID - Department for International Development (United Kingdom)
- DNA - Deoxyribonucleic acid
- DO - Dissolved oxygen
- DRC - Democratic Republic of the Congo
- DRR - Disaster risk reduction

== E ==
- Ecosan - Ecological sanitation
- EC - Electrical conductivity
- Eh - Redox potential
- EIA - Environmental impact assessment
- EM - Effective microorganisms
- EN - European standards (the N stands for Normalisation in French), e.g. EN 12566
- EPA - United States Environmental Protection Agency
- EPS - Extracellular polymeric substances
- EQND - Equality and nondiscrimination
- ESARO - East and Southern Africa Region
- EU - European Union

== F ==
- FAO - Food and Agriculture Organization of the United Nations
- FAQ - Frequently asked questions
- FC - Fecal coliforms
- FECR - Fecal egg count reduction; closest article is on anthelmintic
- FFS (or F4S) - Fit for School
- FGD - Focus group discussion; closest article may be Qualitative psychological research
- FGM - Female genital mutilation
- FOAM - Focus on Opportunity, Ability and Motivation
- FS - Fecal (or faecal) sludge; closest article is septage
- FSM - Fecal (or faecal) sludge management
- FSSM - Fecal sludge and septage management
- FSTP - Fecal sludge treatment plant
- FTI - Faecally-transmitted infections; closest article is fecal–oral transmission

== G ==
- GAP - Good agricultural practices
- GHG - Greenhouse gases
- GIZ - Deutsche Gesellschaft für Internationale Zusammenarbeit
- GLAAS - UN-Water Global Analysis and Assessment of Sanitation and Drinking-Water
- GPS - Global positioning system
- GSF - Global sanitation fund, closest page is Water Supply and Sanitation Collaborative Council

== H ==
- HACCP - Hazard analysis and critical control points
- hab. - inhabitant or user, used in design parameters of wastewater treatment, e.g. 60 g BOD/hab.
- HAI - Hospital-acquired infection
- HCF - Health care facility
- HEDF - Human excreta derived fertiliser (see reuse of excreta)
- HEW - Health Extension Worker
- HH - Household
- HIA - Health impact assessment
- HQ - Headquarters
- HRWS - Human right to water and sanitation
- HWF - Handwashing facility

== I ==
- ICT - Information and communications technology
- IDP - Internally displaced person, often used as "IDP camp"
- IEC - Information, education, communication; closest article may be Behavior change (public health)
- INR - Indian rupee, currency in India
- IWRM - Integrated water resources management

== J ==
- JMP - Joint Monitoring Programme for Water Supply and Sanitation of WHO and UNICEF

== K ==
- KAP - Knowledge, attitude and practice
- kL (or Kl) - Kilo liters (or 1000 liters, same as 1 cubic meter)
- KM - Knowledge management
- Ksh - Kenyan shilling, currency in Kenya
- KVIP - Kumasi ventilated-improved pit, closest article is Pit latrine

== L ==
- L - Lakh, used for one hundred thousand in India
- L - Liter (or litre in British English spelling)
- LCC - Life-cycle cost, see Whole-life cost or Life-cycle cost analysis
- LCCA - Life-cycle cost analysis
- LGA - Local government area
- LMICs - Low and middle income countries
- LNOB - Leave no one behind
- lpcd - Liters per capita per day (liters per person per day), e.g. for daily wastewater flowrate

== M ==
- MBBR - Moving Bed Biofilm Reactor
- MBR - Membrane bioreactor
- MCA - Multiple criteria analysis, see Multiple-criteria decision analysis
- MCDA - Multiple-criteria decision analysis
- MDA - Mass drug administration
- MDG - Millennium Development Goal
- M&E - Monitoring and evaluation
- MENA - Middle East and North Africa
- MFC - Microbial fuel cell
- MFI - Microfinance institution
- mg - Milligram
- μg - Microgram
- MHM - Menstrual hygiene management
- ML - Megaliter or 1 million liter or 1000 cubic meters
- MLD - Million liters per day
- MOH - Ministry of health (see also List of health departments and ministries)
- MOOC - Massive open online course
- MOS - Manual of style
- MoU - Memorandum of understanding
- MoUD - Ministry of Urban Development
- MSW - Municipal solid waste

== N ==
- NBA - Nirmal Bharat Abhiyan in India, formerly called "Total Sanitation Campaign" (TSC) - not to be confused with CLTS
- NGO - Non-governmental organization
- NIMBY - Not In My Back Yard
- NRW - Non-revenue water
- NSS - Non-sewered sanitation (similar term to fecal sludge management)
- NTDs - Neglected tropical diseases

== O ==
- OBA - Output based aid
- OD - Open defecation
- ODA - Official development assistance
- ODK - Open Data Kit
- O&M - Operation and maintenance
- ODF - Open defecation free, i.e. a community without open defecation taking place
- OP - Omni Processor
- OPEX - Operational expenditure (or operating expense)
- ORP - Oxidation reduction potential
- ORT - Oral rehydration therapy

== P ==
- PbR - Payment by results
- PC - Preventive chemotherapy; closest article is helminthiasis
- PFU - Plaque-forming unit
- PHC - Primary health centre
- PIM - Post implementation monitoring; no article yet, see WASH
- PMU - Project management unit
- PSP - Public sector participation, see also Public–private partnership
- PVC - Polyvinyl chloride
- PPP - Public private partnership
- ppm - Parts per million
- ppb - Parts per billion

== Q ==
- QA/QC - Quality assurance / quality control
- Q&A - Question and answer, see also FAQ
- QMRA - Quantitative Microbiological Risk Assessment

== R ==
- RBF - Results-based financing, see also Output based aid or Payment by Results
- RCT - Randomized controlled trial
- R&D - Research and development
- RNA - Ribonucleic acid
- RRR - Resource Recovery and Reuse
- RTI - Reproductive tract infection
- RTTC - Reinvent the Toilet Challenge, an R&D funding scheme by the Bill and Melinda Gates Foundation
- RVO - Rijksdienst voor Ondernemend Nederland (Netherlands Enterprise Agency)

== S ==
- SAR - Sodium adsorption ratio
- SBA (or SBM) - Swachh Bharat Abhiyan, Clean India Mission or Swachh Bharat Mission
- SBR - Sequencing batch reactor
- SDG - Sustainable Development Goal
- SDG6 - Sustainable Development Goal Number 6: "Clean Water and Sanitation"
- SFD - Shit Flow Diagram
- SHG - Self-help group
- SLA - Service-level agreement
- SLB - Service-level benchmarking
- SLTS - School-led total sanitation, see Community-led total sanitation
- SME - Small and medium-sized enterprise
- SMS - Short message service
- SOP - Standard operating procedure
- STP - Sewage treatment plant
- SRHR - Sexual and reproductive health and rights
- SRT - Solids retention time, see also Activated sludge
- SS - Suspended solids
- SSA - Sub-Saharan Africa
- SSLA - Sanitation Service-level agreement
- SSP - Sanitation safety planning; closest page might be Water safety plan
- SuSanA - Sustainable Sanitation Alliance
- SWASH - School Water, Sanitation and Hygiene, see Water, Sanitation and Hygiene

== T ==
- T90 - Time at which 90 percent reduction in pathogens is achieved
- TAF - Technology Applicability Framework
- ThOD - Theoretical oxygen demand
- ToR - Terms of reference
- TSC - Total sanitation campaign in India, now called Nirmal Bharat Abhiyan - not to be confused with CLTS
- TSS - Total suspended solids (in sanitary engineering) or Toxic shock syndrome (medical field)
- TSSM - Total Sanitation and Sanitation Marketing
- TSU - Technical support unit

== U ==
- UASB - Upflow anaerobic sludge blanket reactor
- UCD - User-centered design
- UDDT - Urine-diverting dry toilet
- UDT - Urine diversion toilet
- UDFT - Urine Diverting Flush Toilet
- μg - Microgram
- ULB - Urban local body
- UNDP - United Nations Development Programme
- UNEP - United Nations Environment Programme
- UNSGAB - United Nations Secretary General's Advisory Board on Water and Sanitation
- USEPA - United States Environmental Protection Agency
- UTI - Urinary tract infection

== V ==
- VIP - Ventilated improved pit latrine
- VND - Vietnamese Dong (currency in Vietnam)

== W ==
- WASH or WaSH - Water, sanitation and hygiene
- WASH2 - Water, sanitation, hygiene and health
- WatSan - Water and sanitation, used in the same way as WASH
- WC - Water closet
- WEF - Water-Energy-Food nexus
- WG - Working group
- WinS - WASH in schools
- WHO - World Health Organization
- WPM - Water point mapping
- WSP:
  - Water and sanitation program of the World Bank
  - Water safety plan
  - Waste stabilization pond
- WSUP - Water and sanitation for the urban poor
- WSH - Water, sanitation, hygiene
- WSSCC - Water Supply and Sanitation Collaborative Council
- WTD - World Toilet Day
- WTP:
  - Water treatment plant
  - Willingness to pay
- WWD - World Water Day
- WWTP - Wastewater treatment plant
- WYSIWYG - What You See is What You Get

== See also ==
- Wikiproject Sanitation
- List of water supply and sanitation by country
