= Sustainable sanitation =

Sanitation system designed to meet certain criteria and to work well over the long-term

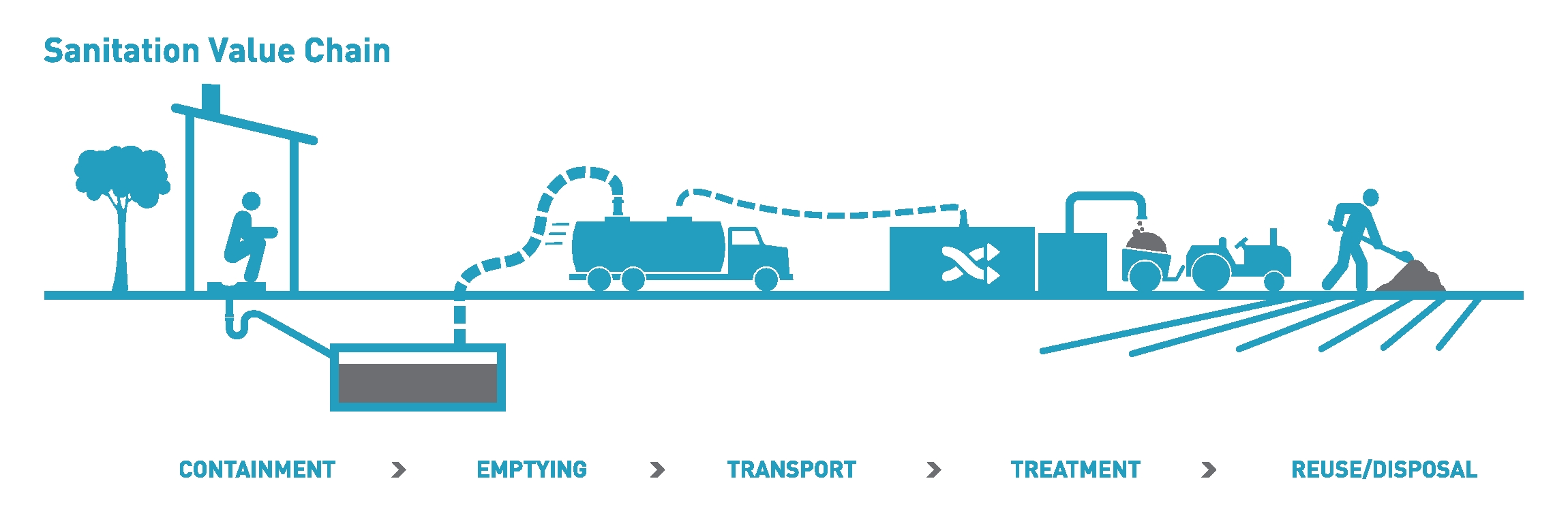
Sustainable sanitation approaches focus on the "sanitation value chain" which includes collection, emptying, transport, treatment and reuse/disposal.

Sustainable sanitation is a sanitation system designed to meet certain criteria and to work well over the long-term. Sustainable sanitation systems consider the entire "sanitation value chain", from the experience of the user, excreta and wastewater collection methods, transportation or conveyance of waste, treatment, and reuse or disposal. The Sustainable Sanitation Alliance (SuSanA) includes five features (or criteria) in its definition of "sustainable sanitation": Systems need to be economically and socially acceptable, technically and institutionally appropriate and protect the environment and natural resources.

The purpose of sustainable sanitation is the same as sanitation in general: to protect human health. However, "sustainable sanitation" attends to all processes of the system: This includes methods of collecting, transporting, treating and the disposal (or reuse) of waste.

Increasingly, sustainable sanitation also involves the consideration of climate change related impacts on sanitation infrastructure and behaviour and the resilience of technologies and communities.

== Terminology ==
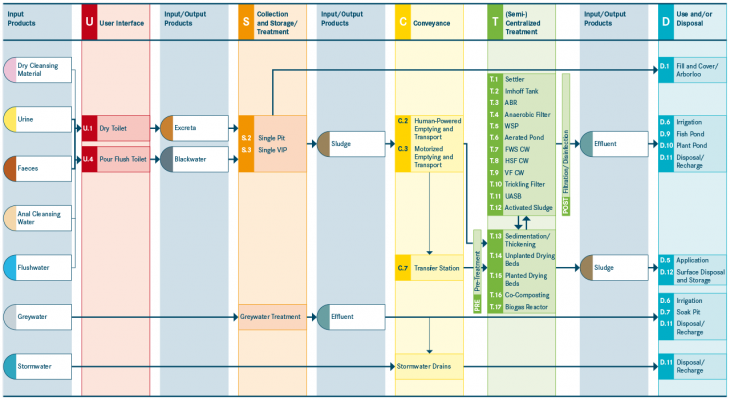
Example for the systems approach of sustainable sanitation: Single Pit System (Compendium of Sanitation Systems and Technologies)

=== Comparison with "improved sanitation" ===
The Joint Monitoring Programme for Water Supply and Sanitation (JMP) of the WHO (World Health Organization) and UNICEF (United Nations Children's Fund) was responsible for monitoring progress towards the Millennium Development Goal for drinking water and sanitation. For reasons of simplicity—being able to monitor the sanitation situation with household surveys—the JMP had to find a simple differentiation between "improved" sanitation (toilets that count towards the MDG goals) and "unimproved" sanitation (toilets that do not count towards the MDG goals).

According to the JMP definition, improved sanitation facilities include facilities which are:

- not shared or public; and
- which are one of the following toilet types: flush or pour-flush to piped sewer system, septic tank or pit latrine, ventilated improved pit latrine, pit latrine with slab or a composting toilet.

Unimproved sanitation facilities according to the JMP include:

- flush or pour-flush to elsewhere (waste is flushed to the street, yard or plot, open sewer, a ditch, a drainage way or other location)
- pit latrine without slab or open pit;
- bucket toilet; hanging toilet or hanging latrine, or no facilities or bush or field (open defecation).

In some circumstances "improved" sanitation facilities can be regarded as not sustainable, whereas in other circumstances "unimproved" sanitation facilities can be regarded as sustainable. This is because it depends on the sanitation system, of which the toilet is only one part. For example, a pit latrine with a slab can become unsustainable sanitation if it is polluting the groundwater or if the waste sludge that is removed from the pit latrine is dumped into the environment. A bucket toilet can become sustainable if the collection, treatment and reuse or disposal of waste is taken care of in a safe manner, for example with the urine-diverting dry toilets that SOIL is employing in Haiti.

=== Comparison with ecosan ===
Sustainable sanitation, defined with the five sustainability measures, may or may not have an focus on reuse of excreta, because the criterion of "protecting the natural resources" is only one of several that need to be aimed towards. In comparison, ecological sanitation (ecosan) has a strong focus on the reuse of waste.

The term is widely used since about 2009.

== Sustainability criteria ==
The main objective of a sanitation system is to protect and promote human health by providing a clean environment and breaking the cycle of disease. In order to be sustainable a sanitation system has to be not only economically viable, socially acceptable, and technically and institutionally appropriate, but it should also protect the environment and the natural resources. According to the Sustainable Sanitation Alliance, when improving an existing and/or designing a new sanitation system, sustainability criteria related to the following aspects should be considered:

=== Health ===
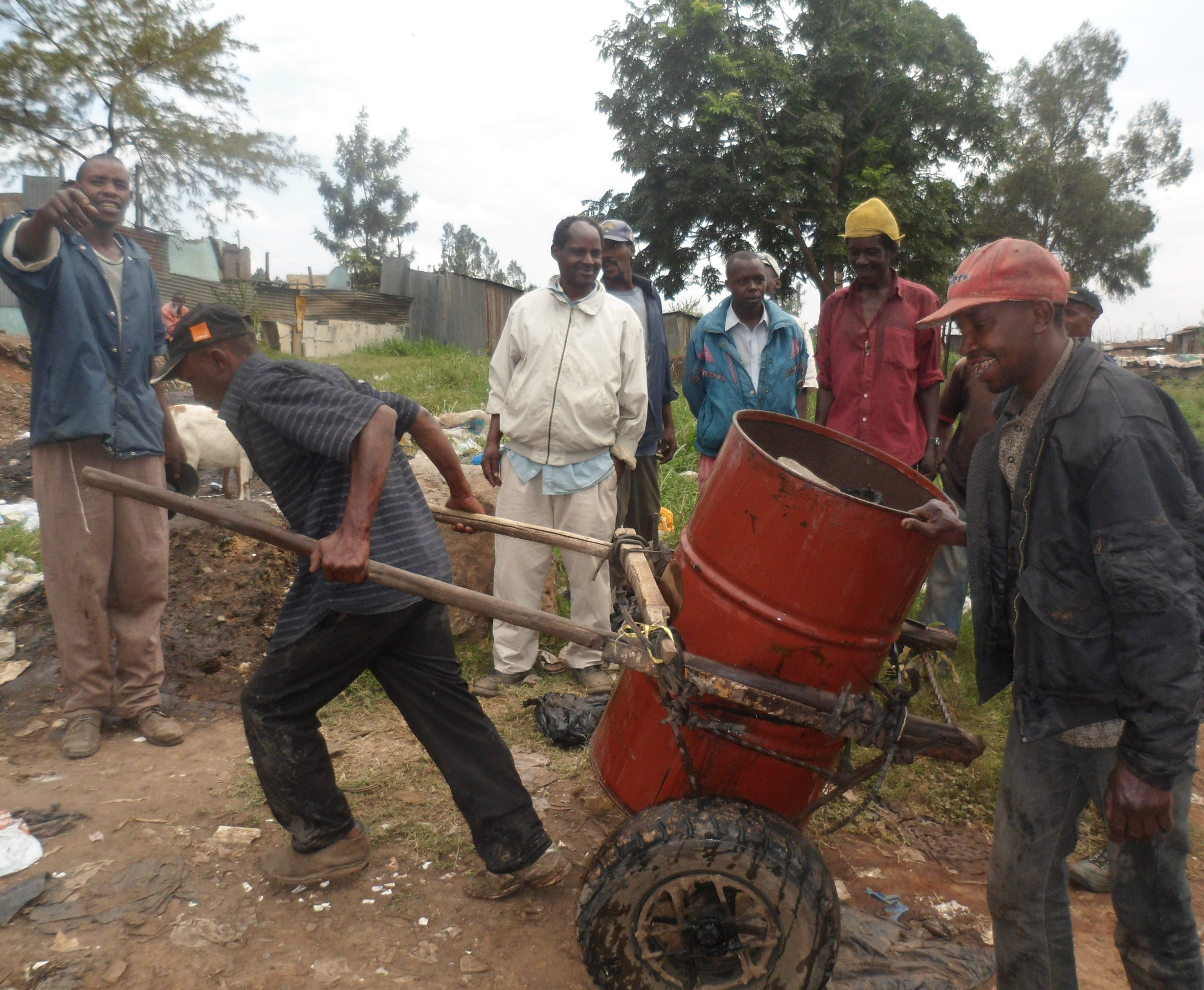
Poorly handled fecal sludge poses high health risks (much spillage and no personal protective equipment for the workers).

Health aspects include the risk of exposure to pathogens and hazardous substances that could affect public health at all points of the sanitation system from the toilet via the collection and treatment system to the point of reuse or disposal. The topic also covers aspects such as hygiene, nutrition and the improvement of livelihood achieved by the application of a certain sanitation system, as well as downstream effects.

=== Environment and natural resources ===
Environment and natural resources aspects involve the required energy, water and other natural resources for construction, operation and maintenance of the system, as well as the potential emissions to the environment resulting from use. It also includes the degree of recycling and reuse of excreta practiced and the effects of these, for example reusing the wastewater, returning nutrients and organic material to agriculture, and the protecting of other non-renewable resources, for example through the production of renewable energy (e.g. biogas or fuel wood).

=== Technology and operation ===
Technology and operation aspects incorporate the functionality and the ease with which the system can be constructed, operated and monitored using the available human resources (e.g. the local community, technical team of the local utility etc.). It also concerns the suitability to achieve an efficient substance flow management from a technical point of view. Furthermore, it evaluates the robustness of the system, its vulnerability towards disasters, and the flexibility and adaptability of its technical elements to the existing infrastructure, to demographic and socio-economic developments and climate change.

=== Finance and economics ===
Financial and economic issues relate to the capacity of households and communities to pay for sanitation, including the construction, maintenance and depreciation of the system. Besides the evaluation of investment, operation and maintenance costs, the topic also takes into account the economic benefits that can be obtained in "productive" sanitation systems, including benefits from the production of the recyclables (soil conditioner, fertiliser, energy and reclaimed water), employment creation, increased productivity through improved health and the reduction of environmental and public health costs.

=== Socio-cultural and institutional aspects ===
Socio-cultural and institutional aspects take into account the socio-cultural acceptance and appropriateness of the system, convenience, system perceptions, gender issues and impacts on human dignity, the contribution to subsistence economies and food security, and legal and institutional aspects.

== Planning for sustainable sanitation ==
Most sanitation systems have been designed with the five aspects in mind, but in practice they are failing far too often because some of the criteria are not met. Since there is no one-for-all sanitation solution which fulfils the sustainability criteria, evaluation will depend on the local framework and will have to take into consideration the existing environmental, technical, socio-cultural and economic conditions.

Some basic principles to be observed when planning and implementing a sustainable sanitation system were endorsed by the members of the Water Supply and Sanitation Collaborative Council (the "Bellagio Principles for Sustainable Sanitation") during its 5th Global Forum in November 2000:

1. Human dignity, quality of life and environmental security at household level should be at the centre of any sanitation approach.
2. In line with good governance principles, decision-making should involve participation of all stakeholders, especially the consumers and providers of services.
3. Waste should be considered a resource, and its management should be holistic and form part of integrated water resource, nutrient flow and waste management processes.
4. The domain in which environmental sanitation problems are resolved should be kept to the minimum practicable size (household, community, town, district, catchment, city).

These planning guidelines have been revised further and are now used in various training courses for urban planners.

=== Optimization of resource recovery ===
Sustainable sanitation that allows for resource recovery has the potential to contribute to circular economies and green cities, sustainable food chains, renewable energy, and new business models for private sector involvement.

Five recommendations were made in 2020 for the optimization of resource recovery: (i) prioritize short systems that close the loop at the lowest possible level; (ii) separate waste streams as much as possible, because this allows for higher recovery potentials; (iii) use storage and treatment technologies that contain the products as much as possible, avoid leaching technologies (e.g. single pits) and technologies with high risk of volatilization (e.g. drying beds); (iv) design sinks to optimize recovery and avoid disposal sinks; and (v) combine various reuse options for different side streams (e.g. urine diversion systems that combine reuse of urine and production of biofuel from feces).

== Examples ==
Some examples for improving present sanitation practices in the short-term, purely from a technology perspective, are listed below:

- Pit latrines could be modified to be soil-composting latrines (Arborloos), thus requiring some wall reinforcement, made shallow (max 1–1.5 m) and maintained using daily soil additions: the pits would be periodically closed and covered with soil in order to allow for sanitization and composting prior to emptying and reuse in agriculture.
- Simple urinals with separate collector systems could be installed instead of using toilets and pit latrines for urination
- Flush toilets could be modified to use less water or reuse greywater.
- Greywater could be source-separated from the blackwater from toilets thus simplifying its treatment and providing opportunities for reuse.
- Blackwater from toilets could be held in conservancy tanks instead of open septic tanks and cess pits and then emptied and transported to biogas reactors; alternatively the toilets could be connected to biogas reactors.
- Cess (or drainage) pits e.g. from pour-flush toilets could be equipped with a safety zone of additional filter material to prevent contamination of ground water.
- Above ground dry toilets with urine diversion could be installed in dry areas lacking water, rocky areas where pits are expensive to dig and areas with high water tables and flooding.

With respect to the other sustainability factors, key areas of attention include:

- the creation of an enabling environment
- market development
- capacity development
- lasting behaviour change
- monitoring sustainability
- tackling slippage
- equality, non-discrimination and leaving no one behind
- climate change impacts
- mechanisms for learning

== See also ==
- Bill and Melinda Gates Foundation - active in the area of sustainable sanitation research and implementation
- World Toilet Day - the theme in 2020 was "sustainable sanitation and climate change"
