= Ecological sanitation =

Approach to sanitation provision which aims to safely reuse excreta in agriculture

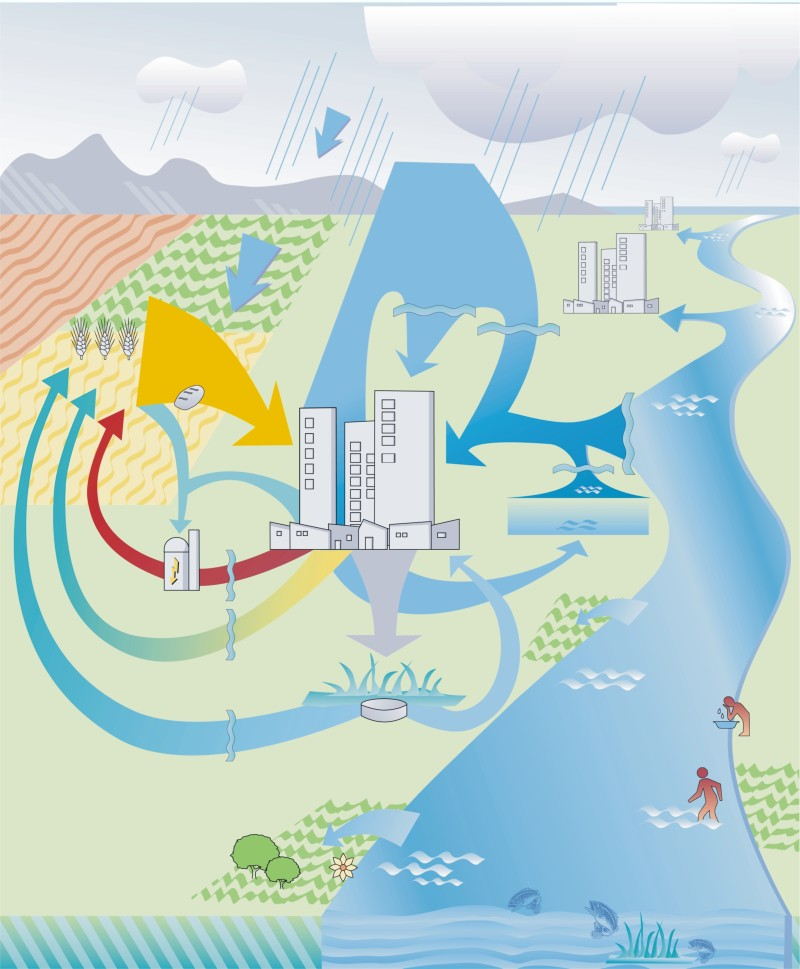
Ecosan concept showing a separation of flow streams, treatment and reuse; 2014 illustration

Ecological sanitation, commonly abbreviated as ecosan (also spelled eco-san or EcoSan), and also known as circular sanitation as a reference to the circular economy, is an approach to sanitation provision which aims to safely reuse excreta in agriculture. It is an approach, rather than a technology or a device which is characterized by a desire to "close the loop", mainly for the nutrients and organic matter between sanitation and agriculture in a safe manner. One of the aims is to minimise the use of non-renewable resources. When properly designed and operated, ecosan systems provide a hygienically safe system to convert human excreta into nutrients to be returned to the soil, and water to be returned to the land. Ecosan is also called resource-oriented sanitation.

== Definition ==
The definition of ecosan has varied in the past. In 2012, a widely accepted definition of ecosan was formulated by Swedish experts: "Ecological sanitation systems are systems which allow for the safe recycling of nutrients to crop production in such a way that the use of non-renewable resources is minimized. These systems have a strong potential to be sustainable sanitation systems if technical, institutional, social and economic aspects are managed appropriately."

Prior to 2012, ecosan has often been associated with urine diversion and in particular with urine-diverting dry toilets (UDDTs), a type of dry toilet. For this reason, the term "ecosan toilet" is widely used when people mean a UDDT. However, the ecosan concept should not be limited to one particular type of toilet. Also, UDDTs can be used without having any reuse activities in which case they are not in line with the ecosan concept (an example being the 80,000 UDDTs implemented by eThekwini Municipality near Durban, South Africa).

=== Use of the term "ecosan" ===
The term "ecosan" was first used in 1995 and the first project started in 1996 in Ethiopia, by an NGO called Sudea. A trio, Dr Torsten Modig, Umeå University, Almaz Terrefe, teamleader, and Gunder Edström, hygiene expert, chose an area in a dense urban area as a starting point. They used urine diverting dry toilets (UDDTs) coupled with reuse activities.

In the ecosan concept, human excreta and wastewater is regarded as a potential resource – which is why it has also been called "resource oriented sanitation". The term "productive sanitation" has also been in use since about 2006.

=== Comparison with the term "sustainable sanitation" ===
The definition of ecosan is focusing on the health, environment and resource aspect of sustainable sanitation. Thus ecosan is not, per se, sustainable sanitation, but ecosan systems can be implemented in a sustainable way and have a strong potential for sustainable sanitation, if technical, institutional, social and economical aspects are cared for appropriately. Ecosan systems can be "unsustainable" for example if there is too little user acceptance or if the costs of the system are too high for a given target group of users, making the system financially unsustainable in the longer term.

== Overview ==
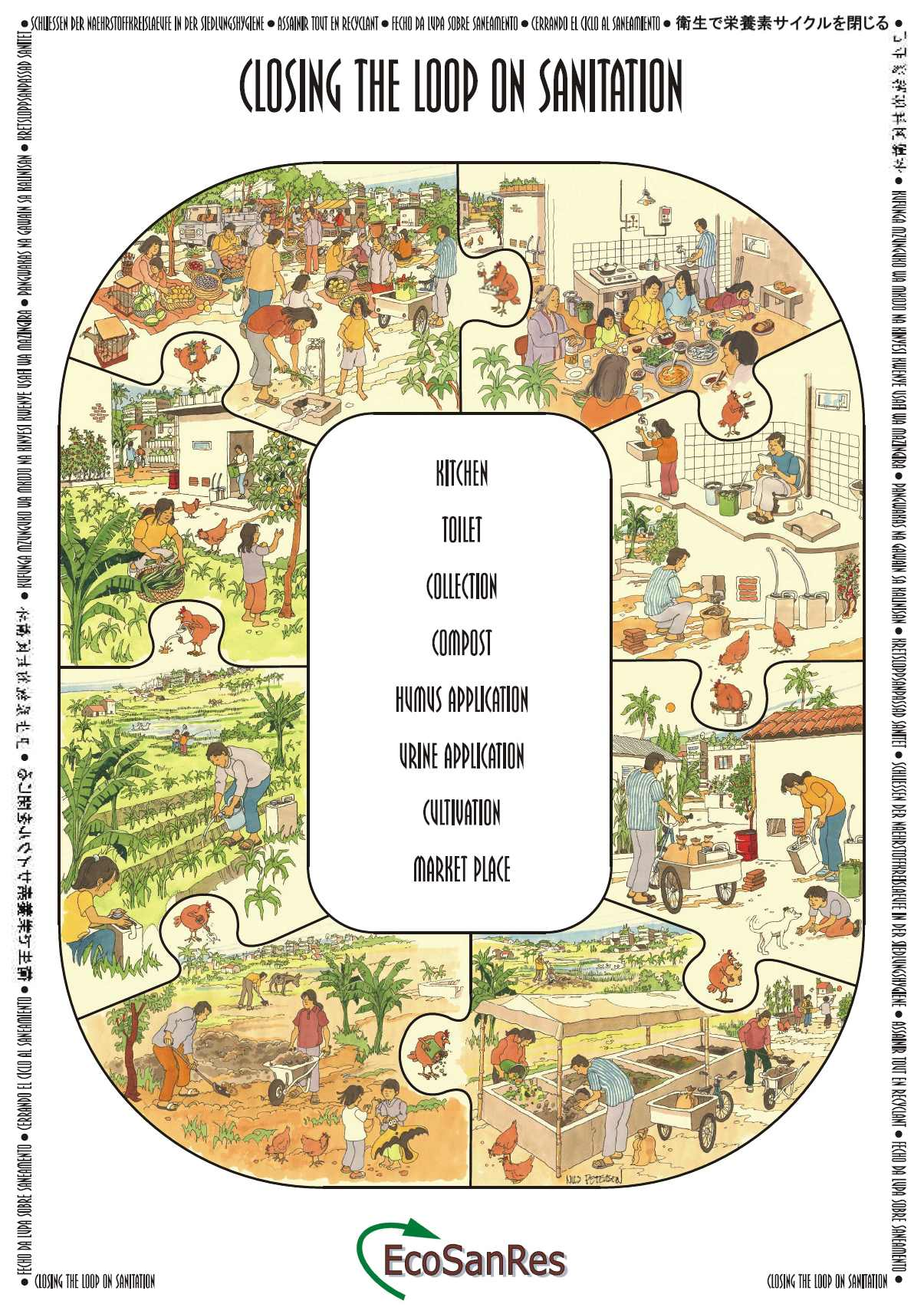
Poster by EcoSanRes program: Closing the loop on Sanitation (2005)

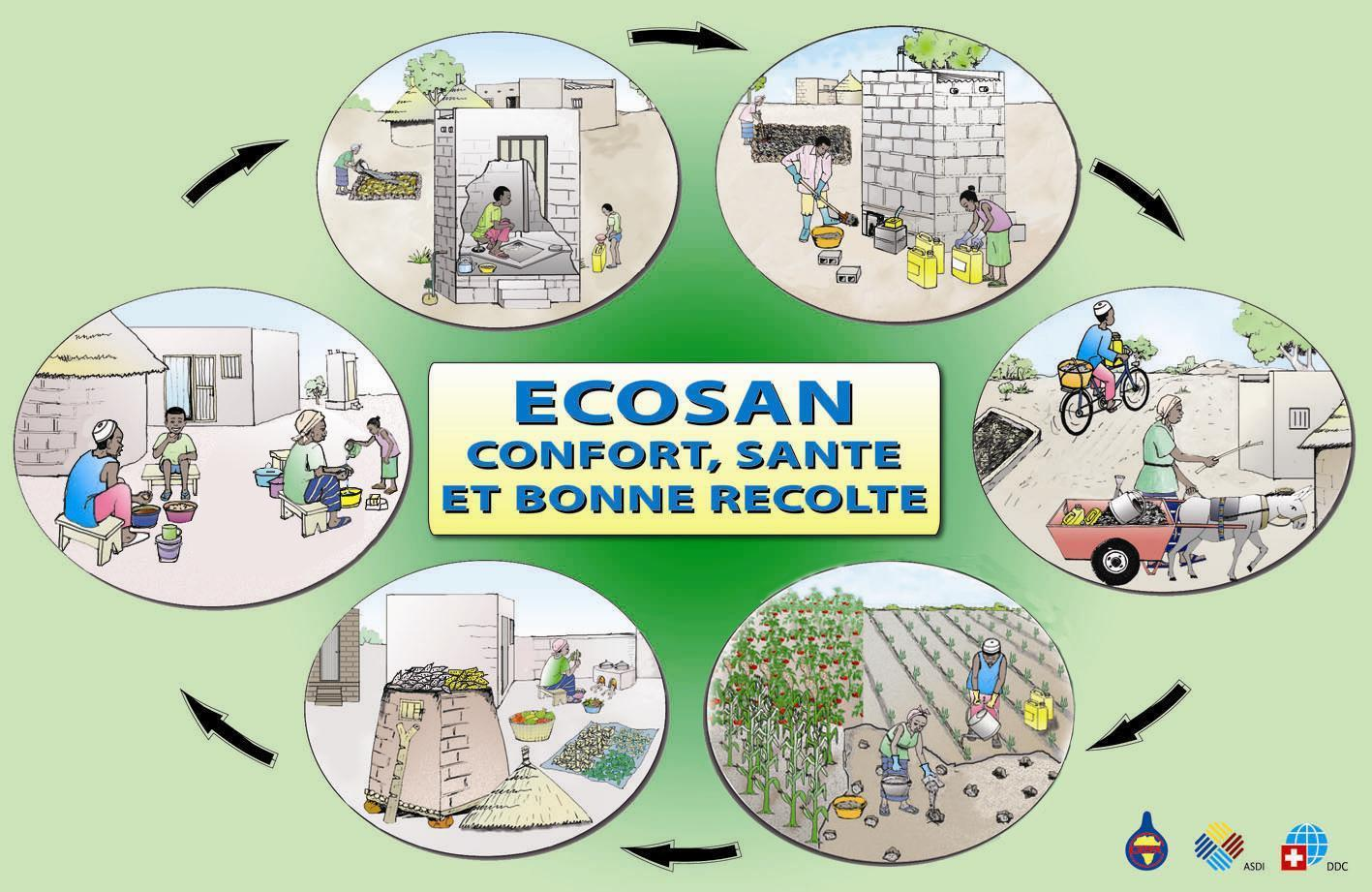
Ecosan closing the loop poster (in French), by the NGO CREPA in 2005, UDDTs are used in this example

The main objectives of ecological sanitation are to reduce the health risks related to sanitation, contaminated water and waste; to prevent groundwater pollution and surface water pollution; and to reuse nutrients or energy contained within wastes.

=== Resource recovery ===
The statement in the definition of ecosan to "safely recycle" includes hygienic, microbial and chemical aspects. Thus, the recycled human excreta product, in solid or liquid form, shall be of high quality both concerning pathogens and all kind of hazardous chemical components. The statement "use of non-renewable resources is minimized" means that the gain in resources by recycling shall be larger than the cost of resources by recycling.

Ecosan is based on an overall concept of material flows as part of an ecologically and economically sustainable wastewater management system tailored to the needs of the users and to the respective local conditions. It does not favor a specific sanitation technology, but is rather a certain philosophy in handling substances that have so far been seen simply as wastewater and water-carried waste for disposal.

==== Reuse as fertilizer ====
The first proponents of ecosan systems had a strong focus on increasing agricultural productivity (via the reuse of excreta as fertilizers) and thus improving the nutritional status of the people at the same time as providing them with safe sanitation. Disease reduction was meant to be achieved not only by reducing infections transmitted via the fecal–oral route but also by reducing malnutrition in children. This link between WASH, nutrition, a disease called environmental enteropathy (or tropical enteropathy) as well as stunted growth of children has risen to the top of the agenda of the WASH sector since about 2013.

Agricultural trials around the world have shown measurable benefits of using treated excreta in agriculture as a fertilizer and soil conditioner. This applies in particular to the use of urine. Reuse trials in Zimbabwe showed positive results for using urine on green, leafy plants such as spinach or maize as well as fruit trees. Another study in Finland indicated that the use of urine and the use of urine and wood ash "could produce 27% and 10% more red beet root biomass". Urine has been proven in many studies to be a valuable, relatively easy to handle fertilizer, containing nitrogen, phosphorus, potassium and important micro-nutrients.

==== Phosphorus recovery ====
Another aspect that ecosan systems are trying to address is the possible upcoming shortage of phosphorus. Phosphorus has an important role for plant growth, and therefore in fertilizer production, but is a limited mineral resource. The situation is similar for potassium. Known mineral phosphate rock reserves are becoming scarce and increasingly costly to extract – this is also called the "peak phosphorus" crisis. One review of global phosphate supply suggested that if collected, phosphate in urine could supply 22% of the total demand.

=== Benefits ===
Benefits of ecosan systems include:

- Minimizing the introduction of pathogens from human excreta into the water cycle (groundwater and surface water) - for example groundwater pollution by pit latrines.
- Conservation of resources through lower water consumption, substitution of mineral fertilizer and minimization of water pollution.
- Less reliance on mined phosphorus and other non-renewable resources for fertilizer production.
- Reduced consumption of energy in fertilizer production: Urea is a major component of urine, yet we produce vast quantities of urea by using fossil fuels. By properly managing urine, treatment costs as well as fertilizer costs can be reduced.

== Challenges ==
The ecosan approach has been criticized for being overly focused on reuse in agriculture, whilst neglecting some of the other criteria for sustainable sanitation. In fact, ecosan systems can be "unsustainable", for example, if there is too little user acceptance or if the costs of the system are too high for a given target group of users, making the system financially unsustainable in the longer term.

Some proponents of ecosan have been criticized as being too dogmatic, with an over-emphasis on environmental resource protection rather than a focus on public health protection and provision of sanitation at a very low cost (for example UDDTs, which some people call "ecosan toilets", may be more expensive to build than pit latrines, even if in the longer term they are cheaper to maintain).

The safety of ecosan systems in terms of pathogen destruction during the various treatment processes is a continuous topic of debate between proponents and opponents of ecosan systems. However, the publication of the WHO Guidelines on Reuse, with its multiple barrier concept, has gone a long way in establishing a common framework for safe reuse. Nevertheless, the question remains whether ecosan systems can ever be scaled up to reach millions of people and how they can be made sufficiently safe to operate. The initial excitement in the early 2000s by the ecosan pioneers has changed into a realization that changing attitudes and behaviors in sanitation takes a lot of patience.

Acknowledgement for ecosan came with the awarding of the Stockholm Water Prize in 2013 to Peter Morgan, a pioneer of handpumps and ventilated pit latrines (VIPs) in addition to ecosan-type toilets (the Arborloo, the Skyloo and the Fossa alterna). Peter Morgan is renowned as one of the leading creators and proponents of ecological sanitation solutions, which enable the safe reuse of human excreta to enhance soil quality and crop production. His ecosan-type toilets are now in use in countries across the globe, centred on converting a sanitary problem into a productive resource.

Also many of the research projects that the Bill and Melinda Gates Foundation have been funding since about 2011 in sanitation are dealing with resource recovery – this might well be a legacy of the ecosan concept, even if the term "ecosan" is not used by these researchers.

== Technologies used in ecosan systems ==
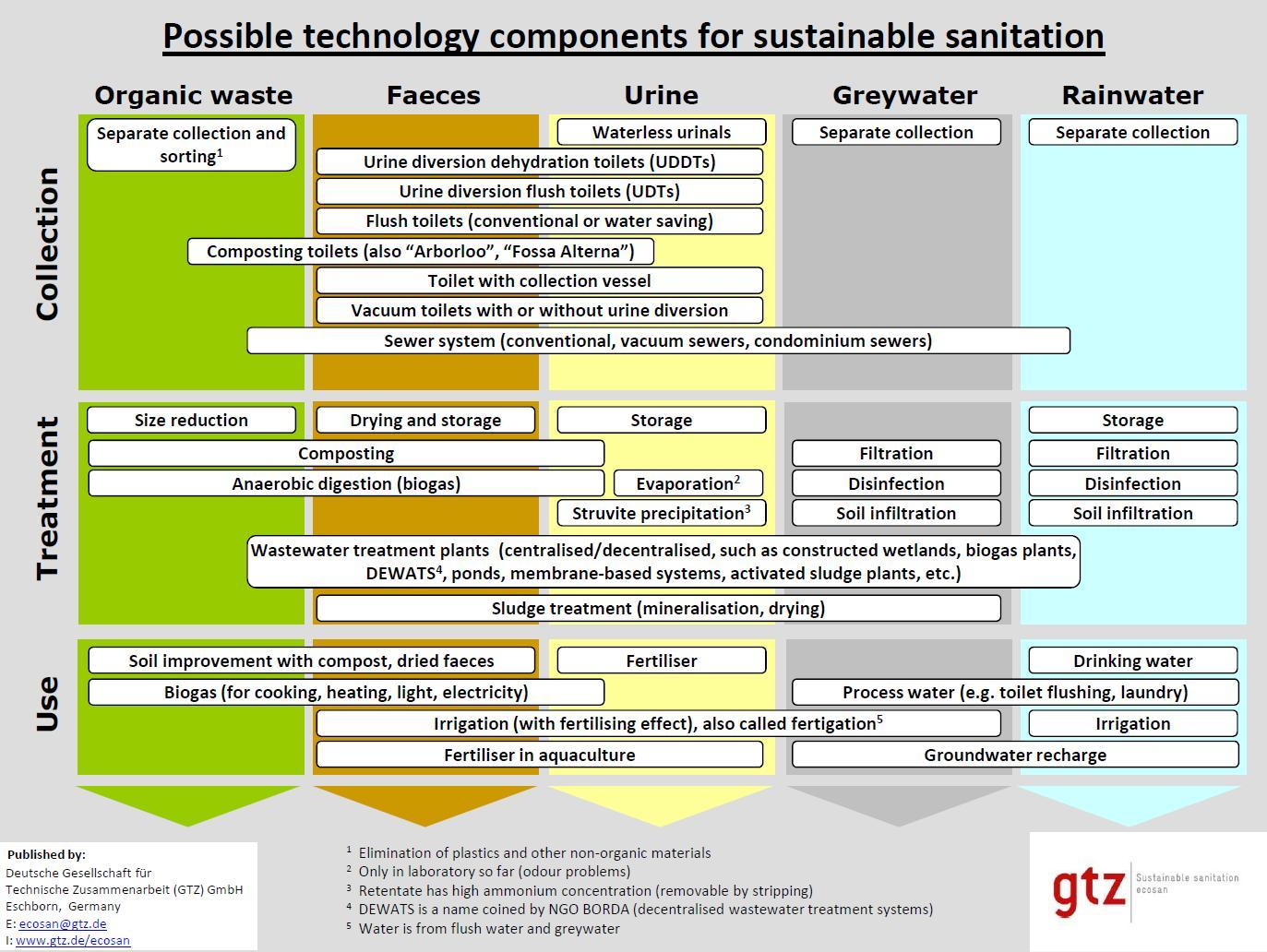
Possible technology components for sustainable sanitation, of which ecosan is a sub-set focussing on the reuse possibilities

Ecosan offers a flexible framework, where centralized elements can be combined with decentralized ones, waterborne with dry sanitation, high-tech with low-tech, etc. By considering a much larger range of options, optimal and economic solutions can be developed for each particular situation. Technologies used in ecosan systems often - but not always - include elements of source separation, i.e. keeping different waste streams separate, as this can make treatment and safe reuse easier.

The most common technology used in ecosan systems is the urine-diverting dry toilet, but ecosan systems can also use other technologies, such as vacuum toilets coupled with biogas plants, constructed wetlands, composting toilets and so forth.

Examples of ecosan projects worldwide can be found in a list published by GIZ in 2012, as well as in those case studies published by the Sustainable Sanitation Alliance that are focused on reuse activities.

== History ==
=== Excreta reuse in dry sanitation systems ===
The recovery and use of urine and feces in "dry sanitation systems", i.e. without sewers or without mixing substantial amounts of water with the excreta, has been practiced by almost all cultures. The reuse was not limited to agricultural production. The Romans, for example, were aware of the bleaching attribute of the ammonia within urine and used it to whiten clothing.

Many traditional agricultural societies recognized the value of human waste for soil fertility and practised the "dry" collection and reuse of excreta. This enabled them to live in communities in which nutrients and organic matter contained in excreta were returned to the soil. Historical descriptions about these practices are sparse, but it is known that excreta reuse was practiced widely in Asia (for example in China, Japan, Vietnam, Cambodia, Korea) but also in Central and South America. However, the most renowned example of the organised collection and use of human excreta to support food production is that of China. The value of "night soil" as a fertilizer was recognized with well-developed systems in place to enable the collection of excreta from cities and its transportation to fields. The Chinese were aware of the benefits of using excreta in crop production more than 2500 years ago, enabling them to sustain more people at a higher density than any other system of agriculture.

In Mexico the Aztec culture collected human excreta for agricultural use. One example of this practice has been documented for the Aztec city of Tenochtitlan which was founded in 1325 and was one of the last cities of pre-Hispanic Mexico (conquered in 1521 by the Spanish): The population placed the sweepings in special boats moored at docks around the city. Mixtures of sweepings and excreta were used to fertilize the chinampas (agricultural fields) or to bolster the banks bordering the lake. Urine was collected in containers in all houses, then mixed with mud and used as a fabric dye. The Aztecs recognized the importance of recycling nutrients and compounds contained in wastewater.

In Peru, the Incas had a high regard for excreta as a fertilizer, which was stored, dried and pulverized to be utilized when planting maize.

In the Middle Ages, the use of excreta and greywater in agricultural production was the norm. European cities were rapidly urbanizing and sanitation was becoming an increasingly serious problem, whilst at the same time the cities themselves were becoming an increasingly important source of agricultural nutrients. The practice of directly using the nutrients in excreta and wastewater for agriculture therefore continued in Europe into the middle of the 19th century. Farmers, recognizing the value of excreta, were eager to get these fertilizers to increase production and urban sanitation benefited. This practice was also called gong farmer in England but carried many health risks for those involved with transporting the excreta and fecal sludge.

Besides direct use, excreta was also processed to produce pure chemicals. Using nitraries and nitre beds, one extract the nitrogen within as potassium nitrate (KNO_{3}), a key ingredient in gunpowder. KNO_{3} was also responsible for the discovery of nitric acid in the 17th century.

Traditional forms of sanitation and excreta reuse have continued in various parts of the world for centuries and were still common practice at the advent of the Industrial Revolution. Even as the world became increasingly more urbanised, the nutrients in excreta collected from urban sanitation systems without mixing with water were still used in many societies as a resource to maintain soil fertility, despite rising population densities.

=== Decline in recovery of nutrients from human excreta in dry systems ===
Recovery of nutrients from excreta in non-sewered sanitation systems was addressing the sanitation problems in settlements in Europe and elsewhere and was contributing to securing agricultural productivity. However, the practice did not become the dominant approach to urban sanitation in the 20th century and was gradually replaced with sewer-based sanitation systems without nutrient recovery (apart from agricultural reuse of sewage sludge in some cases) – at least for cities that can afford it.

There were four main driving factors that led to the demise in the recovery and use of excreta and greywater from European cities in the 19th century:

- Growth of urban settlements and increasing distance from agricultural fields.
- Increasing water consumption and use of flush toilet: Water flushing greatly increased the volume of sewage, at the same time diluting the nutrients, making it virtually impossible for them to be recovered and reused as they previously were.
- Production of cheap synthetic fertilizers, making any efforts to recover and reuse the nutrients and organic material from the large volumes of sewage obsolete.
- Political intervention as a consequence of the perceived need for a change with regards to how to deal with odorous substances: Up until the end of the nineteenth century the dominant theory on the spread of illness was the miasma theory. This theory stated that everything that smelled had to be gotten rid of because inhaling bad smells was thought to lead to illness.

The use of (odorous) animal manure in agriculture has continued through to this day, probably because the odor of manure was not thought to contribute to human illnesses.

The recovery of nutrients from wastewater still continues in two forms:

- Wastewater reuse or resource recovery: Use of raw, treated or partially treated wastewater for irrigation in agriculture (with the associated health risks if it is done in an improper way which is often the case in developing countries); and
- Application of sewage sludge to agricultural lands which is not without controversy in many industrialized countries due to the risks of polluting soils with heavy metals and micropollutants if not managed properly (see biosolids).

=== Research from 1990s onwards ===
The Swedish International Development Cooperation Agency (Sida) funded the "SanRes R&D programme" during 1993 to 2001 which lay the foundation for the subsequent "EcoSanRes programme" carried out by Stockholm Environment Institute (2002–2011). A publication by Sida called "Ecological sanitation" in 1998 compiled the knowledge generated to date about ecosan in a popular book which was published as a second edition in 2004. The book has also been translated into Chinese, French and Spanish.

The German government enterprise GIZ also had a large "ecosan program" from 2001 to 2012. Whilst the term "ecosan" was preferred in the initial stages of this program, it was from 2007 onwards more and more replaced by the broader term "sustainable sanitation". In fact, the Sustainable Sanitation Alliance was founded in 2007 in an attempt to broaden the ecosan concept and to bring together various actors under one umbrella.

Research into how to make reuse of urine and feces safe in agriculture was carried out by Swedish researchers, for example Hakan Jönsson and his team, whose publication on "Guidelines on the Use of Urine and feces in Crop Production" was a milestone which was later incorporated into the WHO "Guidelines on Safe Reuse of Wastewater, Excreta and Greywater" from 2006. The multiple barrier concept to reuse, which is the key cornerstone of this publication, has led to a clear understanding on how excreta reuse can be done safely.

=== Workshops and conferences ===
Initially, there were dedicated "ecosan conferences" to present and discuss research on ecosan projects:

- A first workshop on ecological sanitation was held in Balingsholm, Sweden in 1997, where all the then established ecosan experts, such as Håkan Jönsson, Peter Morgan (winner of the 2013 Stockholm Water Prize), Ron Sawyer, George Anna Clark and Gunder Edström participated.
- Workshop in Mexico in 1999 with the title "Closing the Loop - Ecological sanitation for food security"
- Ecosan conference in Bonn, Germany in 2000
- First international ecosan conference in Nanning, China in 2001
- Second ecosan conference in Lübeck Germany in 2003
- Third ecosan conference in Durban, South Africa in 2005
- Ecosan conference in Fortaleza, Brazil called "International Conference on Sustainable Sanitation - Water and Food Security for Latin America" in 2007

Since then the ecosan theme has been integrated into other WASH conferences, and separate large ecosan conferences have no longer been organised.

=== Disputes amongst experts ===
During the 1990s, when the term ecosan was something new, discussions were heated and confrontational. Supporters of ecosan claimed the corner on containment, treatment and reuse. The proponents of conventional sanitation systems on the other side defended pit latrines and waterborne sewage systems. Ecosan supporters criticized conventional sanitation for contaminating waterways with nutrients and pathogens. Since about 2007, the two opposing sides have slowly found ways of dealing with each other, and the formation of the Sustainable Sanitation Alliance in that year has further helped to provide a space for all sanitation actors to meet and push into the same direction of sustainable sanitation.

== Examples ==
- Sweden is the leader in Europe to put ecosan into practice at a larger scale. For example, Tanum Municipality in Sweden has introduced urine separation toilets due to their very rocky and challenging terrain initially, and later also to recover phosphorus.
- Sweden has also made it possible in 2013 to certify safe and sanitized blackwater (urine and human excreta) from blackwater systems and for further use as a recognized fertilizer. Such blackwater systems could be vacuum toilets or septic tanks. The criteria for the certification have been developed by the Swedish Institute for Agricultural and Environmental Engineering and may pave the way for farmers to use human waste for agricultural production. The Federation of Swedish Farmers have been active in this development. Furthermore, the Swedish EPA in their last proposal in 2014 has downgraded the hygiene risk associated with urine.
- Stockholm Environment Institute (SEI) ran a large worldwide ecosan research programme called "Ecosanres" from 2001 to 2011. One of the "dry ecosan" pilot projects (i.e. with using dry toilets) of this programme was a large scale implementation of UDDTs in multi-story buildings together with other technologies to allow resource recovery from excreta. This project was called the Erdos Eco-Town Project in a town called Erdos in the Inner Mongolia Autonomous Region of China. It was a collaboration between the Dongsheng District government in Erdos and the Stockholm Environment Institute and aimed to save water and provide sanitation services in this drought-stricken and rapidly urbanizing area of northern China. For a variety of technical, social and institutional reasons, the UDDTs were removed after only a few years and the project failed to deliver in the area of nutrient recovery. This project is now well documented and has raised more awareness of the challenges and disadvantages of "urban ecosan".
- The Rich Earth Institute in Brattleboro, Vermont, US, is an NGO dedicated to reclaiming human urine as fertilizer. They have established the only community-scale urine nutrient reclamation program in the United States and are researching and developing treatment technologies to optimize the use of urine as fertilizer.
- SOIL in Haiti built what they call "ecosan toilets" (UDDTs) as part of the emergency relief effort following the 2010 Haiti earthquake. More than 20,000 Haitians are currently using SOIL ecological sanitation toilets and SOIL has produced over 400,000 liters of compost as a result. The compost is used for agricultural and reforestation projects. SOIL's composting process is effective in inactivating Ascaris eggs – an indicator for helminth eggs in general – in the excreta collected from the dry toilets within 16 weeks. The composting and monitoring methods used by SOIL in Haiti may serve as an example for other international settings.
- Sanitation First, an NGO in the UK is building ecosan facilities (UDDTs) in various parts of the developing world. They predominantly work in Tamil Nadu (India), where the Tamil Nadu State Government provides subsidies for their work. They have also constructed ecosan in other parts of rural India, Kenya and Sierra Leone. According to their website, 58,000 people worldwide are using their ecosan toilets in 2021.
- The NGO CREPA which was operating in the French-speaking West Africa region (now called WSA – Water and Sanitation in Africa) was very active in ecosan promotion from 2002 to 2010 with a strong focus on UDDTs coupled with reuse in agriculture, especially in Burkina Faso.
