= Self-help group =

Self-help group may refer to:

- Support group, group in which members provide each other with various types of help for a particular shared characteristic
- Self-help group (finance), a financial intermediary committee, especially in India
