= Resource recovery =

Using wastes as an input material to create valuable products

Resource recovery is using wastes as an input material to create valuable products as new outputs. The aim is to reduce the amount of waste generated, thereby reducing the need for landfill space, and optimising the values created from waste. Resource recovery delays the need to use raw materials in the manufacturing process. Materials found in municipal solid waste, construction and demolition waste, commercial waste and industrial wastes can be used to recover resources for the manufacturing of new materials and products. Plastic, paper, aluminium, glass and metal are examples of where value can be found in waste.

Resource recovery goes further than just the management of waste. Resource recovery is part of a circular economy, in which the extraction of natural resources and generation of wastes are minimised, and in which materials and products are designed more sustainably for durability, reuse, repairability, remanufacturing and recycling. Life-cycle analysis (LCA) can be used to compare the resource recovery potential of different treatment technologies.

Resource recovery can also be an aim in the context of sanitation. Here, the term refers to approaches to recover the resources that are contained in wastewater and human excreta (urine and feces). The term "toilet resources" has come into use recently. Those resources include: nutrients (nitrogen and phosphorus), organic matter, energy and water. This concept is also referred to as ecological sanitation. Separation of waste flows can help make resource recovery simpler. Examples include keeping urine separate from feces (as in urine diversion toilets) and keeping greywater and blackwater separate.

== Sources of recovery ==
Resource recovery can be enabled by changes in government policy and regulation, circular economy infrastructure such as improved 'binfrastructure' to promote source separation and waste collection, reuse and recycling, innovative circular business models, and valuing materials and products in terms of their economic but also their social and environmental costs and benefits. For example, organic materials can be treated by composting and anaerobic digestion and turned into energy, compost or fertilizer. Similarly, wastes currently stored in industrial landfills and around old mines can be treated with bioleaching and engineered nanoparticles to recover metals such as lithium, cobalt and vanadium for use in low-carbon technologies such as electric vehicles and wind turbines.

A limiting factor of resource recovery is the irrevocable loss of raw materials due to their increase in entropy in our current linear business model. Starting with the production of waste in manufacturing, the entropy increases further by mixing and diluting materials in their manufacturing assembly, followed by corrosion and wear and tear during the usage period. At the end of the life cycle, there is an exponential increase in disorder arising from the mixing of materials in landfills. As a result of this directionality of the entropy law, the potentials of resource recovery are diminishing. This further motivates a circular economy infrastructure and business model.

=== Solid waste ===
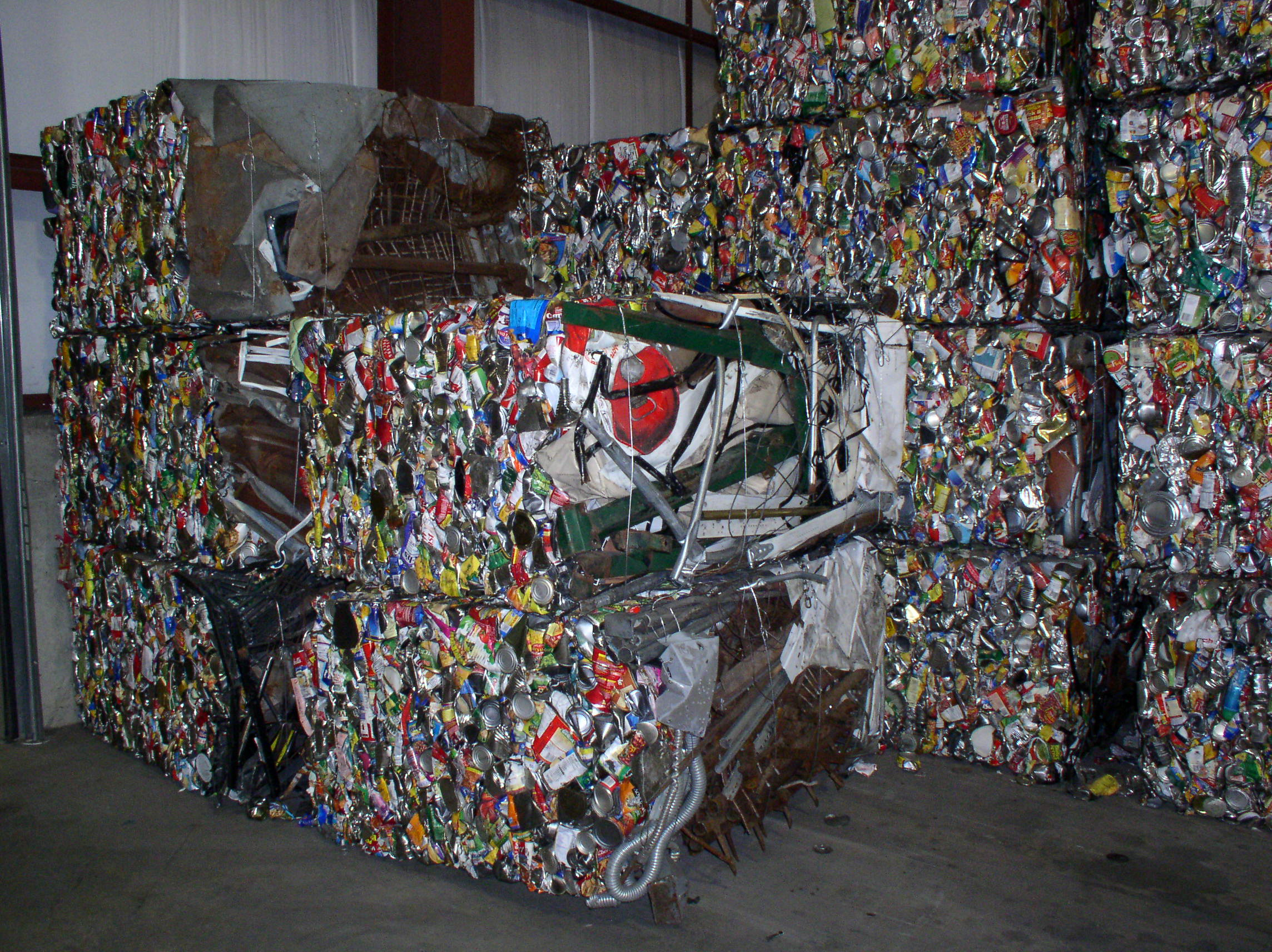
Steel crushed and baled for recycling

Recycling is a resource recovery practice that refers to the collection and reuse of disposed materials such as empty beverage containers. The materials from which the items are made can be reprocessed into new products. Material for recycling may be collected separately from general waste using dedicated bins and collection vehicles, or sorted directly from mixed waste streams.

The most common consumer products recycled include aluminium such as beverage cans, copper such as wire, steel food and aerosol cans, old steel furnishings or equipment, polyethylene and PET bottles, glass bottles and jars, paperboard cartons, newspapers, magazines and light paper, and corrugated fiberboard boxes.

PVC, LDPE, PP, and PS (see resin identification code) are also recyclable. These items are usually composed of a single type of material, making them relatively easy to recycle into new products. The recycling of complex products (such as computers and electronic equipment) is more difficult, due to the additional dismantling and separation required.

The type of recycling material accepted varies by city and country. Each city and country have different recycling programs in place that can handle the various types of recyclable materials.

=== Wastewater and excreta ===
Valuable resources can be recovered from wastewater, sewage sludge, fecal sludge and human excreta. These include water, energy, and fertilizing nutrients nitrogen, phosphorus, potassium, as well as micro-nutrients such as sulphur and organic matter. There is also increasing interest for recovering other raw materials from wastewater, such as bioplastics and metals such as silver. Originally, wastewater systems were designed only to remove excreta and wastewater from urban areas. Water was used to flush away the waste, often discharging into nearby waterbodies. Since the 1970s, there has been increasing interest in treating the wastewater to protect the environment, and efforts focused primarily on cleaning the water at the end of the pipe. Since around the year 2003, the concepts of ecological sanitation and sustainable sanitation have emerged with the focus on recovering resources from wastewater. As of 2016, the term "toilet resources" came into use, and encouraged more attention to the potential for resource recovery from toilets.

The following resources can be recovered:

- Water: In many water-scarce areas there are increasing pressures to recover water from wastewater. In 2006, the World Health Organization, in collaboration with the Food and Agriculture Organization of the United Nations (FAO) and the United Nations Environment Program (UNEP), developed guidelines for safe use of wastewater. In addition, many national governments have their own regulations regarding the use of recovered water. Singapore for example aims to recover enough water from its wastewater systems to meet the water needs of half the city. They call this NEWater. Another related concept for wastewater reuse is sewer mining.
- Energy: The production of biogas from wastewater sludge is now common practice at wastewater treatment plants. In addition, a number of methods have been researched regarding use of wastewater sludge and excreta as fuel sources.
- Fertilizing nutrients: Human excreta contains nitrogen, phosphorus, potassium and other micronutrients that are needed for agricultural production. These can be recovered through chemical precipitation or stripping processes, or simply by use of the wastewater or sewage sludge. However, reuse of sewage sludge poses risks due to high concentrations of undesirable compounds, such as heavy metals, environmental persistent pharmaceutical pollutants and other chemicals. Since the majority of fertilizing nutrients are found in excreta, it can be useful to separate the excreta fractions of wastewater (e.g. toilet waste) from the rest of the wastewater flows. This reduces the risk for undesirable compounds and reduces the volume that needs to be treated before applying recovered nutrients in agricultural production.

Other methods are also being developed for transforming wastewater into valuable products. Growing Black Soldier Flies in excreta or organic waste can produce fly larvae as a protein feed. Other researchers are harvesting fatty acids from wastewater to make bioplastics.

=== Organic matter ===
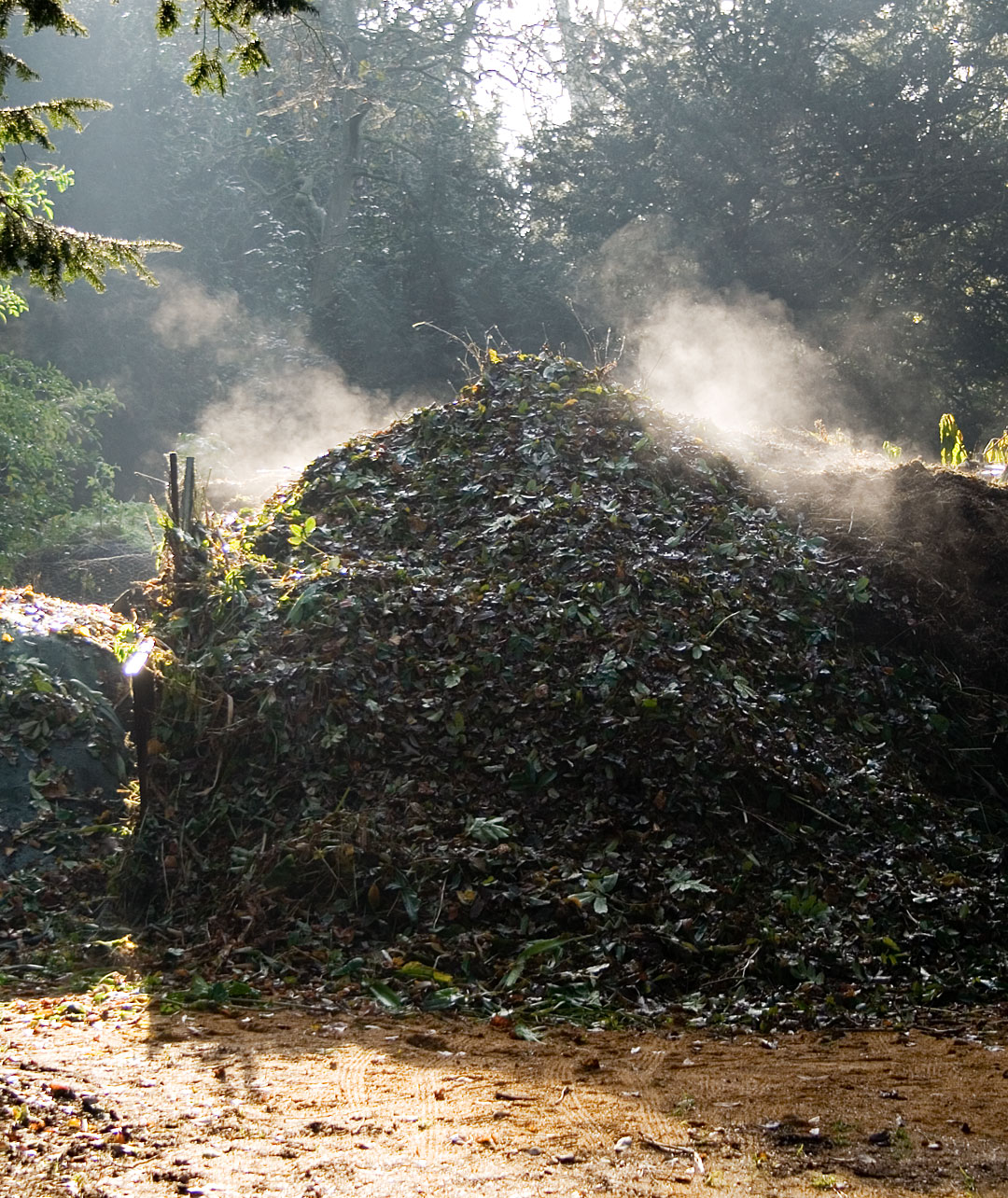
An active compost heap

Disposed materials that are organic in nature, such as plant material, food scraps, and paper products, can be recycled using biological composting and digestion processes to decompose the organic matter. The resulting organic material is then recycled as mulch or compost for agricultural or landscaping purposes. In addition, waste gas from the process (such as methane) can be captured and used for generating electricity and heat (CHP/cogeneration) maximising efficiencies. The intention of biological processing is to control and accelerate the natural process of decomposition of organic matter. In addition to microbial processes, insects such as black soldier fly larvae can also be used to biologically convert organic side-streams, by turning organic waste into protein-rich biomass.

There is a large variety of composting and digestion methods and technologies varying in complexity from simple home compost heaps, to small town scale batch digesters, industrial-scale enclosed-vessel digestion of mixed domestic waste (see mechanical biological treatment). Methods of biological decomposition are differentiated as being aerobic or anaerobic methods, though hybrids of the two methods also exist.

Anaerobic digestion of the organic fraction of municipal solid waste (MSW) has been found to be more environmentally effective, than landfill, incineration or pyrolysis. Life cycle analysis (LCA) was used to compare different technologies. The resulting biogas (methane) though must be used for cogeneration (electricity and heat preferably on or close to the site of production) and can be used with a little upgrading in gas combustion engines or turbines. With further upgrading to synthetic natural gas it can be injected into the natural gas network or further refined to hydrogen for use in stationary cogeneration fuel cells. Its use in fuel cells eliminates the pollution from products of combustion. There is a large variety of composting and digestion methods and technologies varying in complexity from simple home compost heaps, to small town scale batch digesters, industrial-scale, enclosed-vessel digestion of mixed domestic waste (see mechanical biological treatment).

=== Industrial waste ===
Waste valorization, beneficial reuse, value recovery or waste reclamation is the process of waste products or residues from an economic process being valorized (given economic value), by reuse or recycling in order to create economically useful materials. The term comes from practices in sustainable manufacturing and economics, industrial ecology and waste management. The term is usually applied in industrial processes where residue from creating or processing one good is used as a raw material or energy feedstock for another industrial process. Industrial wastes in particular are good candidates for valorization because they tend to be more consistent and predictable than other waste, such as household waste.

Increased regulation of residual materials and socioeconomic changes, such as the introduction of ideas about sustainable development and circular economy in the 1990s and 2000s increased focus on industrial practices to recover resources as value add materials.

== Recovery methods ==
In many countries, source-separated curbside collection is one method of resource recovery.

=== Australia ===
In Australia, households are provided with several bins: one for recycling (yellow lid), another for general waste (usually a red lid) and another for garden materials (green lid). The garden recycling bin is provided by the municipality if requested. Some localities have dual-stream recycling, with paper collected in bags or boxes and all other materials in a recycling bin. In either case, the recovered materials are trucked to a materials recovery facility for further processing.

Municipal, commercial and industrial, construction and demolition debris is dumped at landfills and some is recycled. Household disposal materials are segregated: recyclables sorted and made into new products, and unusable material is dumped in landfill areas. According to the Australian Bureau of Statistics (ABS), the recycling rate is high and is "increasing, with 99% of households reporting that they had recycled or reused within the past year (2003 survey), up from 85% in 1992". In 2002–03 "30% of materials from municipalities, 45% from commercial and industrial generators and 57% from construction and demolition debris" was recycled. Energy is produced is part of resource recovery as well: some landfill gas is captured for fuel or electricity generation, although this is considered the last resort, as the point of resource recovery is avoidance of landfill disposal altogether.

== Sustainability ==
Resource recovery is a key component in a business' ability to maintaining ISO14001 accreditation. Companies are encouraged to improve their environmental efficiencies each year. One way to do this is by changing a company from a system of managing wastes to a resource recovery system (such as recycling: glass, food waste, paper and cardboard, plastic bottles etc.)

Education and awareness in the area of resource recovery is increasingly important from a global perspective of resource management. The Talloires Declaration is a declaration for sustainability concerned about the unprecedented scale and speed of environmental pollution and degradation, and the depletion of natural resources. Local, regional, and global air pollution; accumulation and distribution of toxic wastes; destruction and depletion of forests, soil, and water; depletion of the ozone layer and emission of "green house" gases threaten the survival of humans and thousands of other living species, the integrity of the earth and its biodiversity, the security of nations, and the heritage of future generations. Several universities have implemented the Talloires Declaration by establishing environmental management and resource recovery programs. University and vocational education are promoted by various organizations, e.g., WAMITAB and Chartered Institution of Wastes Management. Many supermarkets encourage customers to use their reverse vending machines to deposit used purchased containers and receive a refund from the recycling fees. Brands that manufacture such machines include Tomra and Envipco.

In 2010, CNBC aired the documentary Trash Inc: The Secret Life of Garbage about waste, what happens to it when it is "thrown away", and its impact on the world.

The United Nations set 17 Sustainable Development Goals (SDG) in 2015. SDG 12, for "responsible consumption and production", measures progress against 11 targets with 13 indicators. Targets 3, 4, and 5 focus on waste generation across food and chemicals.

=== Extended producer responsibility ===
Extended producer responsibility (EPR) is a pricing strategy that promotes integrating all costs associated with a given product throughout its life cycle. Having the market price also reflect the "end-of-life disposal costs" encourages more accuracy in pricing. Extended producer responsibility is meant to impose accountability over the entire lifecycle of products, from production, to packaging, to transport and disposal or reuse. EPR requires firms that manufacture, import and/or sell products to be responsible for those products throughout the life and disposal or reuse of products.

== See also ==
- Food waste
- Circular economy
- Cradle-to-cradle
- Crematorium
- Curb mining
- Industrial symbiosis
- Materials recovery facility
- Bone ash as source of phosphorus
- Product stewardship
- Transfer station (waste management)
