= Reuse of human excreta =

Safe, beneficial use of human excreta mainly in agriculture (after treatment)

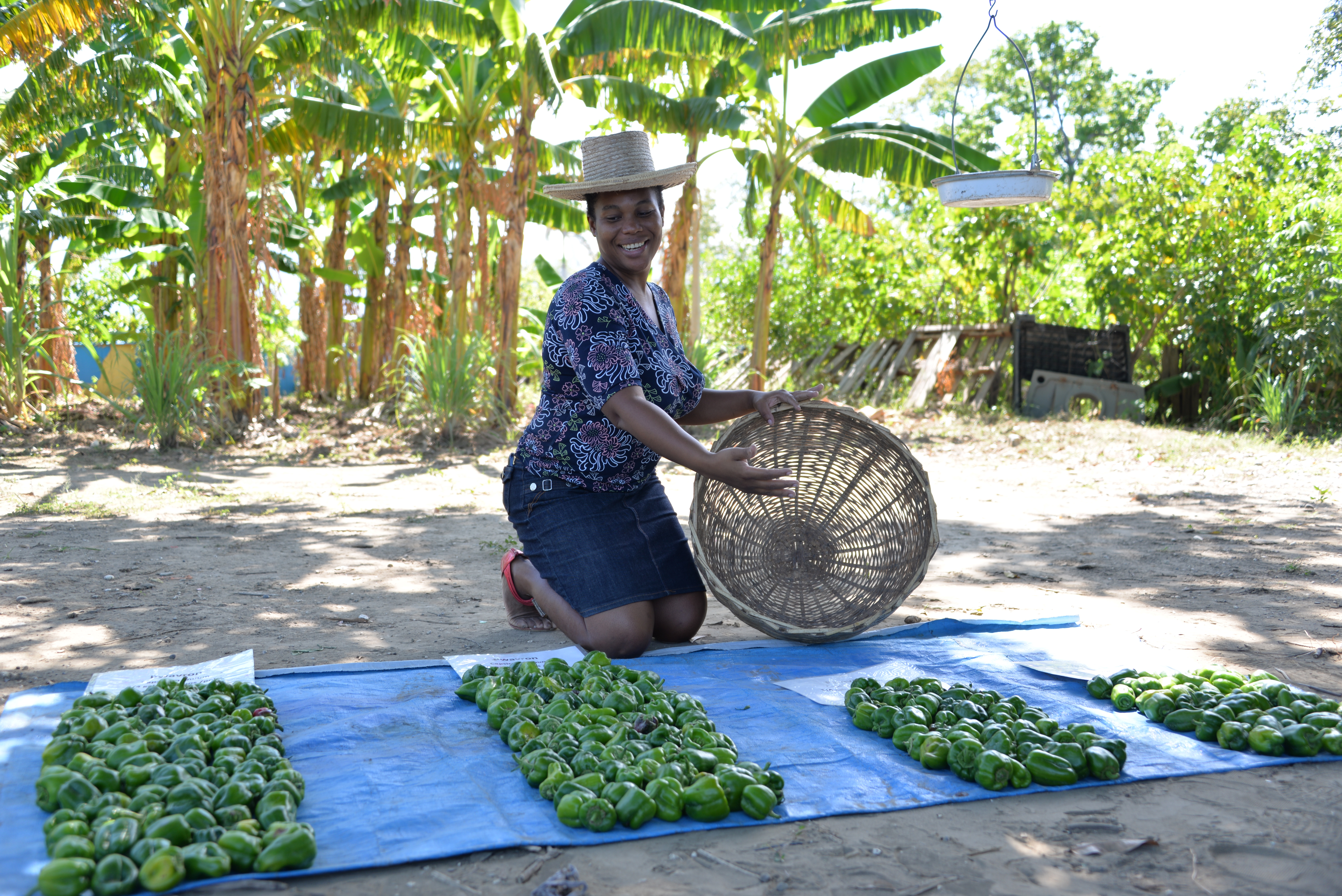
Harvest of capsicum grown with compost made from human excreta at an experimental garden in Haiti

Reuse of human excreta can be safe or unsafe. Beneficial uses of the treated excreta may focus on using the plant-available nutrients (mainly nitrogen, phosphorus and potassium) that are contained in the treated excreta. They may also make use of the organic matter and energy contained in the excreta. To a lesser extent, reuse of the excreta's water content might also take place, although this is better known as water reclamation from municipal wastewater. The intended reuse applications for the nutrient content may include: soil conditioner or fertilizer in agriculture or horticultural activities. Other reuse applications, which focus more on the organic matter content of the excreta, include use as a fuel source or as an energy source in the form of biogas.

There is a large and growing number of treatment options to make excreta safe and manageable for the intended reuse option. Options include urine diversion and dehydration of feces (urine-diverting dry toilets), composting (composting toilets or external composting processes), sewage sludge treatment technologies and a range of fecal sludge treatment processes. They all achieve various degrees of pathogen removal and reduction in water content for easier handling. Pathogens of concern are enteric bacteria, virus, protozoa, and helminth eggs in feces. As the helminth eggs are the pathogens that are the most difficult to destroy with treatment processes, they are commonly used as an indicator organism in reuse schemes. Other health risks and environmental pollution aspects that need to be considered include spreading micropollutants, pharmaceutical residues and nitrate in the environment which could cause groundwater pollution and thus potentially affect drinking water quality.

There are several "human excreta derived fertilizers" which vary in their properties and fertilizing characteristics, for example: urine, dried feces, composted feces, fecal sludge, sewage, sewage sludge.

The nutrients and organic matter which are contained in human excreta or in domestic wastewater (sewage) have been used in agriculture in many countries for centuries. However, this practice is often carried out in an unregulated and unsafe manner in developing countries. World Health Organization Guidelines from 2006 have set up a framework describing how this reuse can be done safely by following a "multiple barrier approach". Such barriers might be selecting a suitable crop, farming methods, methods of applying the fertilizer and education of the farmers.

== Terminology ==
Human excreta, fecal sludge and wastewater are often referred to as wastes (see also human waste). Within the concept of a circular economy in sanitation, an alternative term that is being used is "resource flows". The final outputs from the sanitation treatment systems can be called "reuse products" or "other outputs". These reuse products are general fertilizers, soil conditioners, biomass, water, or energy.

Reuse of human excreta focuses on the nutrient and organic matter content of human excreta unlike reuse of wastewater which focuses on the water content. An alternative term is "use of human excreta" rather than "reuse" as strictly speaking it is the first use of human excreta, not the second time that it is used.

== Technologies and approaches ==
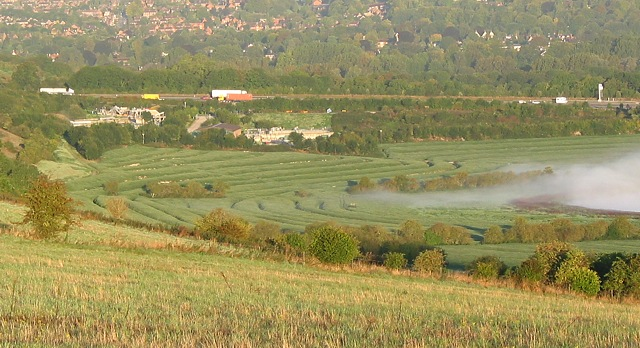
A sewage farm in Hampshire, England

The resources available in wastewater and human excreta include water, plant nutrients, organic matter and energy content. Sanitation systems that are designed for safe and effective recovery of resources can play an important role in a community's overall resource management.

Recovering the resources embedded in excreta and wastewater (like nutrients, water and energy) contributes to achieving Sustainable Development Goal 6 and other sustainable development goals.

It can be efficient to combine wastewater and human excreta with other organic waste such as manure, and food and crop waste for the purposes of resource recovery.

=== Treatment options ===
There is a large and growing number of treatment options to make excreta safe and manageable for the intended reuse option. Various technologies and practices, ranging in scale from a single rural household to a city, can be used to capture potentially valuable resources and make them available for safe, productive uses that support human well-being and broader sustainability. Some treatment options are listed below but there are many more:

- Urine diversion and dehydration of feces (which is done with urine-diverting dry toilets)
- Composting (composting toilets or external composting processes)
- Sewage sludge treatment technologies, which is installed downstream of various wastewater treatment technologies
- Fecal sludge treatment processes, such as sludge drying beds, constructed wetlands.
- Anaerobic digestion with biogas production
- Waste-to-energy process
- Omni processor

A guide by the Swedish University of Agricultural Sciences provides a list of treatment technologies for sanitation resource recovery: Vermicomposting and vermifiltration, black soldier fly composting, algae cultivation, microbial fuel cell, nitrification and distillation of urine, struvite precipitation, incineration, carbonization, solar drying, membranes, filters, alkaline dehydration of urine, ammonia sanitization/urea treatment, and lime sanitization. Further research involves UV advanced oxidation processes in order to degrade organic pollutants present in the urine before reuse or the dehydration of urine by using acids.

=== Reuse options ===
The most common reuse of excreta is as fertilizer and soil conditioner in agriculture. This is also called a "closing the loop" approach for sanitation with agriculture. It is a central aspect of the ecological sanitation approach.

Reuse options depend on the form of the excreta that is being reused: it can be either excreta on its own or mixed with some water (fecal sludge) or mixed with much water (domestic wastewater or sewage).

The most common types of excreta reuse include:

- Fertilizer and irrigation water in agriculture, and horticulture: for example using recovered and treated water for irrigation; using composted excreta (and other organic waste) or appropriately treated biosolids as fertilizer and soil conditioner; using treated source-separated urine as fertilizer.
- Energy: for example digesting feces and other organic waste to produce biogas; or producing combustible fuels.
- Nature-based sewage treatment method using aquatic insect life cycle to produce nutrient rich insect biomass for using as fish/poultry meal, and bio-carbon dioxide, ammonia and methane gases.
- Other: other emerging excreta reuse options include producing protein feeds for livestock using black soldier fly larvae, recovering organic matter for use as building materials or in paper production.

Resource recovery from fecal sludge can take many forms, including as a fuel, soil amendment, building material, protein, animal fodder, and water for irrigation.

Reuse products that can be recovered from sanitation systems include: Stored urine, concentrated urine, sanitized blackwater, digestate, nutrient solutions, dry urine, struvite, dried feces, pit humus, dewatered sludge, compost, ash from sludge, biochar, nutrient-enriched filter material, algae, macrophytes, black soldier fly larvae, worms, irrigation water, aquaculture, and biogas.

== As fertilizer ==
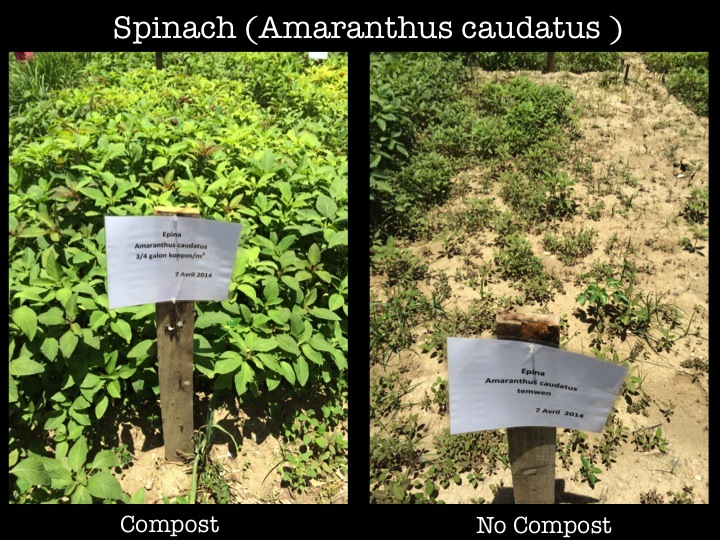
Comparison of spinach field with (left) and without (right) compost, experiments at the SOIL farm in Port-au-Prince, Haiti

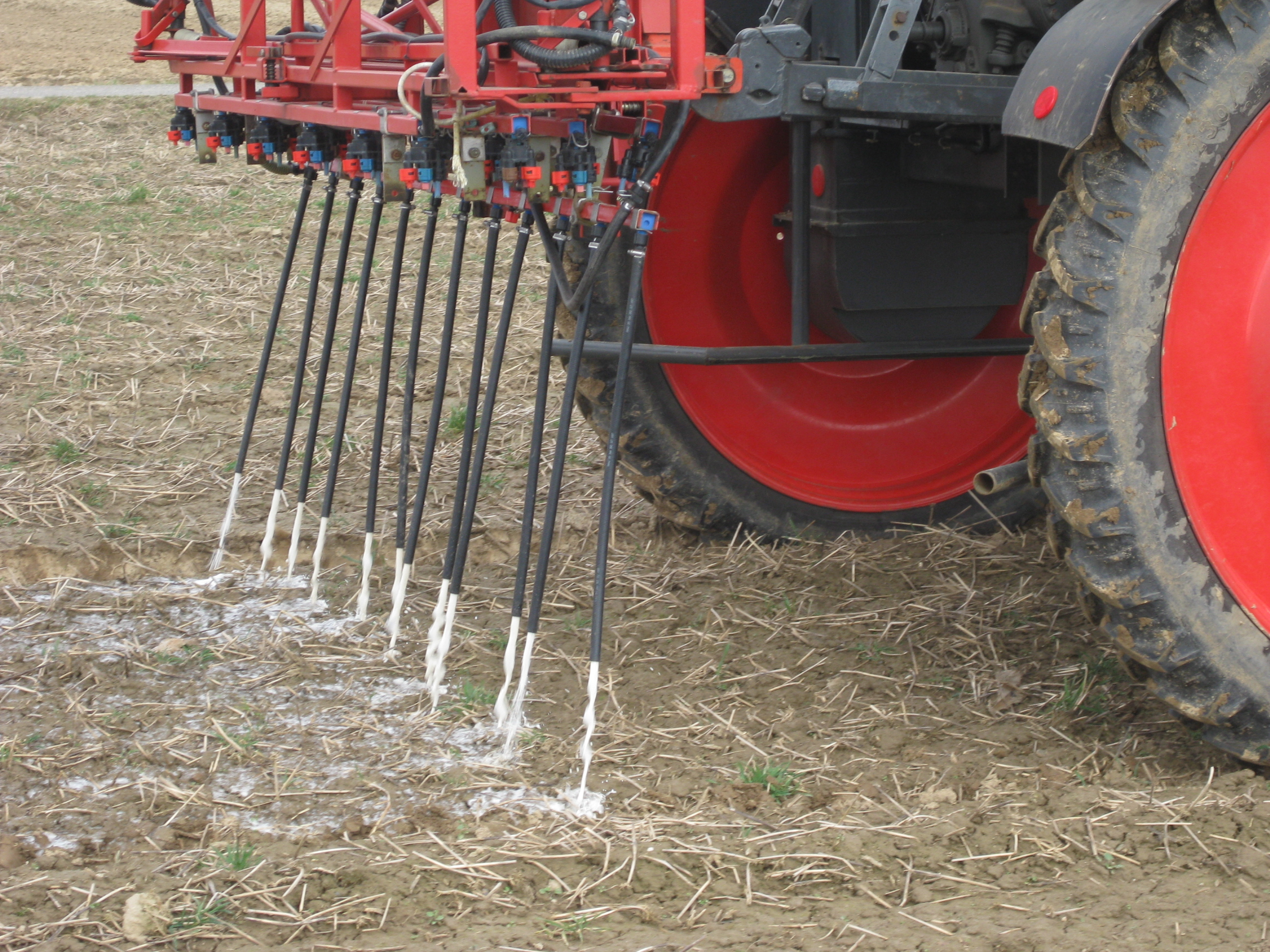
Application of urine on a field near Bonn, Germany, by means of flexible hose close to the soil

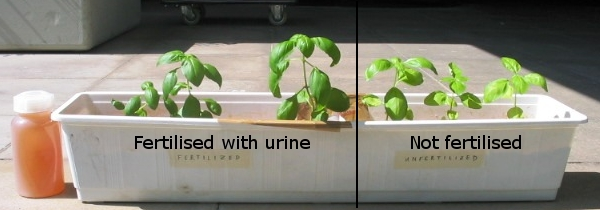
Basil plants: The plants on the right are not fertilized, while the plants on the left are fertilized with urine—in a nutrient-poor soil.

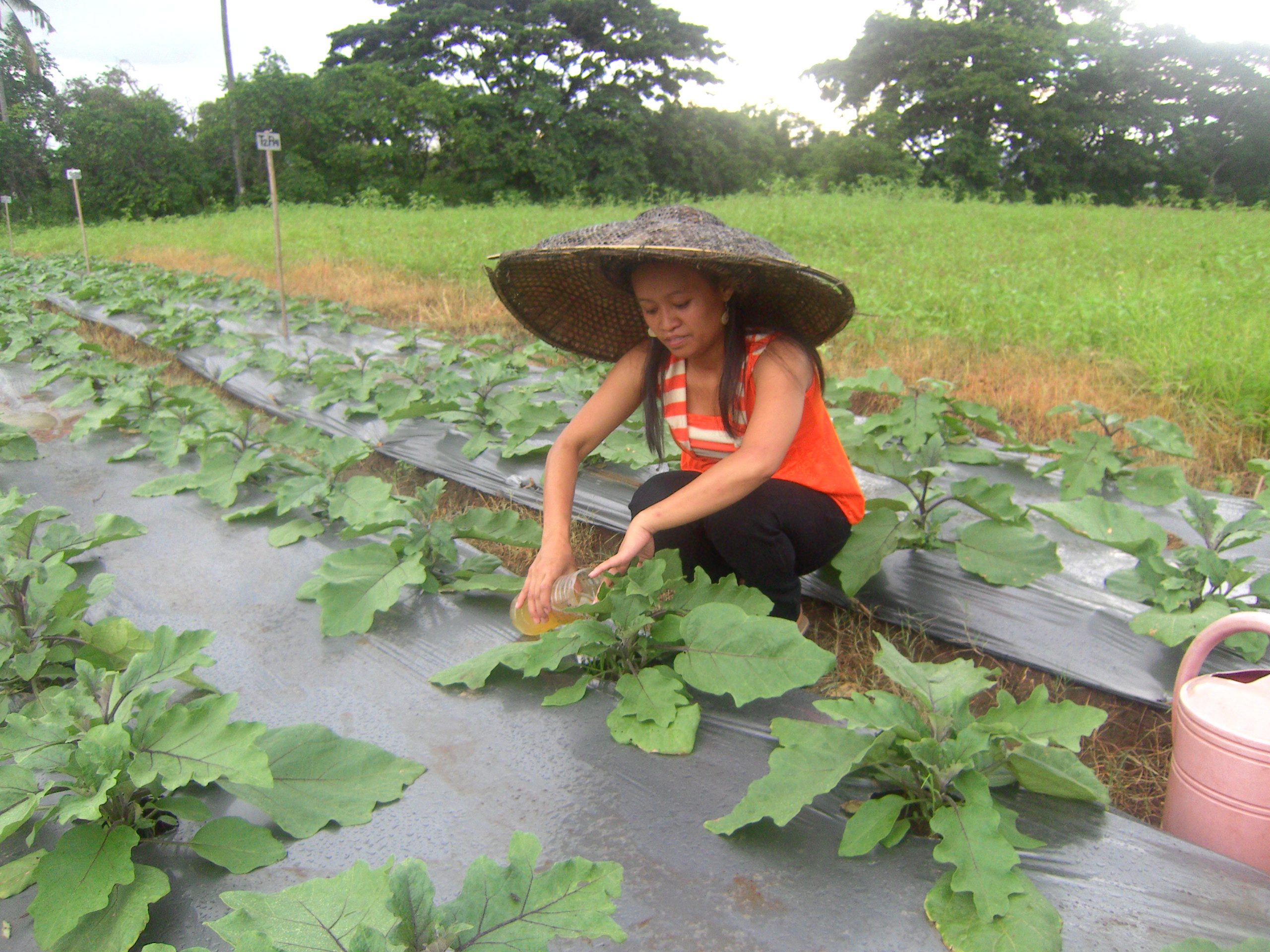
Application of urine on eggplants during a comprehensive urine application field testing study at Xavier University, Philippines

=== Comparison to other fertilizers ===
There is an untapped fertilizer resource in human excreta. In Africa, for example, the theoretical quantities of nutrients that can be recovered from human excreta are comparable with all current fertilizer use on the continent. Therefore, reuse can support increased food production and also provide an alternative to chemical fertilizers, which is often unaffordable to small-holder farmers. However, nutritional value of human excreta largely depends on dietary input.

Mineral fertilizers are made from mining activities and can contain heavy metals. Phosphate ores contain heavy metals such as cadmium and uranium, which can reach the food chain via mineral phosphate fertilizer. This does not apply to excreta-based fertilizers (unless the human's food was contaminated beyond safe limits to start with), which is an advantage.

Fertilizing elements of organic fertilizers are mostly bound in carbonaceous reduced compounds. If these are already partially oxidized as in the compost, the fertilizing minerals are adsorbed on the degradation products (humic acids) etc. Thus, they exhibit a slow-release effect and are usually less rapidly leached compared to mineral fertilizers.

=== Urine ===
Urine contains large quantities of nitrogen (mostly as urea), as well as reasonable quantities of dissolved potassium. The nutrient concentrations in urine vary with diet. In particular, the nitrogen content in urine is related to quantity of protein in the diet: A high protein diet results in high urea levels in urine. The nitrogen content in urine is proportional to the total food protein in the person's diet, and the phosphorus content is proportional to the sum of total food protein and vegetal food protein. Urine's eight main ionic species (> 0.1 meq L−1) are cations Na, K, NH_{4}, Ca, and the anions, Cl, SO_{4}, PO_{4}, and HCO_{3}. Urine typically contains 70% of the nitrogen and more than half the potassium found in sewage, while making up less than 1% of the overall volume. The amount of urine produced by an adult is around 0.8 to 1.5 L per day.

Applying urine as fertilizer has been called "closing the cycle of agricultural nutrient flows" or ecological sanitation or ecosan. Urine fertilizer is usually applied diluted with water because undiluted urine can chemically burn the leaves or roots of some plants, causing plant injury, particularly if the soil moisture content is low. The dilution also helps to reduce odor development following application. When diluted with water (at a 1:5 ratio for container-grown annual crops with fresh growing medium each season or a 1:8 ratio for more general use), it can be applied directly to soil as a fertilizer. The fertilization effect of urine has been found to be comparable to that of commercial nitrogen fertilizers. Urine may contain pharmaceutical residues (environmental persistent pharmaceutical pollutants). Concentrations of heavy metals such as lead, mercury, and cadmium, commonly found in sewage sludge, are much lower in urine.

Typical design values for nutrients excreted with urine are: 4 kg nitrogen per person per year, 0.36 kg phosphorus per person per year and 1.0 kg potassium per person per year. Based on the quantity of 1.5 L urine per day (or 550 L per year), the concentration values of macronutrients are as follows: 7.3 g/L N; .67 g/L P; 1.8 g/L K. These are design values but the actual values vary with diet. (Note: A formula for adjustment of excreta N and P values based on dietary characteristics is found in Jönsson 2004.) Urine's nutrient content, when expressed with the international fertilizer convention of N:P_{2}O_{5}:K_{2}O, is approximately 7:1.5:2.2. (Note: For the amount of other elements in urine, see Rose 2015 and Rich Earth 2021.) Since urine is rather diluted as a fertilizer compared to dry manufactured nitrogen fertilizers such as diammonium phosphate, the relative transport costs for urine are high as a lot of water needs to be transported.

The general limitations to using urine as fertilizer depend mainly on the potential for buildup of excess nitrogen (due to the high ratio of that macronutrient), and inorganic salts such as sodium chloride, which are also part of the wastes excreted by the renal system. Over-fertilization with urine or other nitrogen fertilizers can result in too much ammonia for plants to absorb, acidic conditions, or other phytotoxicity. Important parameters to consider while fertilizing with urine include salinity tolerance of the plant, soil composition, addition of other fertilizing compounds, and quantity of rainfall or other irrigation. It was reported in 1995 that urine nitrogen gaseous losses were relatively high and plant uptake lower than with labelled ammonium nitrate. In contrast, phosphorus was utilized at a higher rate than soluble phosphate. Urine can also be used safely as a source of nitrogen in carbon-rich compost.

Human urine can be collected with sanitation systems that utilize urinals or urine diversion toilets. If urine is to be separated and collected for use as a fertilizer in agriculture, then this can be done with sanitation systems that utilize waterless urinals, urine-diverting dry toilets (UDDTs) or urine diversion flush toilets. During storage, the urea in urine is rapidly hydrolyzed by urease, creating ammonia. Further treatment can be done with collected urine to stabilize the nitrogen and concentrate the fertilizer. One low-tech solution to odor is to add citric acid or vinegar to the urine collection container, so that the urease is inactivated and any ammonia that do form are less volatile. Besides concentration, simple chemical processes can be used to extract pure substances: nitrogen as nitrates (similar to medieval nitre beds) and phosphorus as struvite.

The health risks of using urine as a source of fertilizer are generally regarded as negligible, especially when dispersed in soil rather than on the part of a plant that is consumed. Urine can be distributed via perforated hoses buried ~10 cm under the surface of the soil among crop plants, thus minimizing risk of odors, loss of nutrients due to volatilization, or transmission of pathogens. There are potentially more environmental problems (such as eutrophication resulting from the influx of nutrient rich effluent into aquatic or marine ecosystems) and a higher energy consumption when urine is treated as part of sewage in sewage treatment plants compared with when it is used directly as a fertilizer resource.

In developing countries, the use of raw sewage or fecal sludge has been common throughout history, yet the application of pure urine to crops is still quite rare in 2021. This is despite many publications that advocate the use of urine as a fertilizer since at least 2001. Since about 2011, the Bill and Melinda Gates Foundation is providing funding for research involving sanitation systems that recover the nutrients in urine.

=== Feces ===
According to the 2004 "proposed Swedish default values", an average Swedish adult excretes 0.55 kg nitrogen, 0.18 kg phosphorus, and 0.36 kg potassium as feces per year. The yearly mass is 51 kg wet and 11 kg dried, so that wet feces would have a NPK% value of 1.1:0.8:0.9. (Note: For the amount of other elements in feces, see Rose 2015.)

==== Dried feces ====
Reuse of dried feces from urine-diverting dry toilets after post-treatment can result in increased crop production through fertilizing effects of nitrogen, phosphorus, potassium and improved soil fertility through organic carbon.

==== Composted feces ====
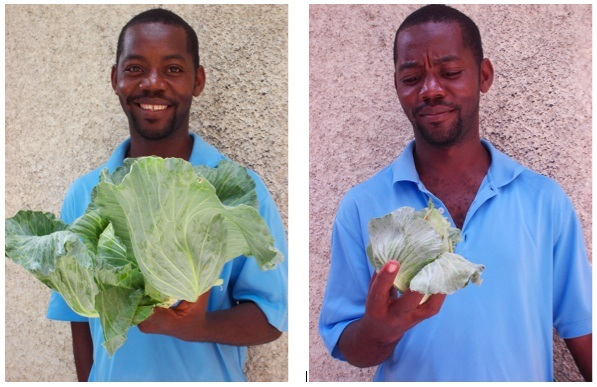
Cabbage grown in excreta-based compost (left) and without soil amendments (right), SOIL in Haiti

Compost derived from composting toilets (where organic kitchen waste is in some cases also added to the composting toilet) has, in principle, the same uses as compost derived from other organic waste products, such as sewage sludge or municipal organic waste. One limiting factor may be legal restrictions due to the possibility that pathogens remain in the compost. In any case, the use of compost from composting toilets in one's own garden can be regarded as safe and is the main method of use for compost from composting toilets. Hygienic measures for handling of the compost must be applied by all those people who are exposed to it, e.g. wearing gloves and boots.

Some of the urine will be part of the compost although some urine will be lost via leachate and evaporation. Urine can contain up to 90 percent of the nitrogen, up to 50 percent of the phosphorus, and up to 70 percent of the potassium present in human excreta.

The nutrients in compost from a composting toilet have a higher plant availability than dried feces from a typical urine-diverting dry toilet. The two processes are not mutually exclusive, however: some composting toilets do divert urine (to avoid over-saturation of water and nitrogen) and dried feces can still be composted.

=== Fecal sludge ===
Fecal sludge is defined as "coming from onsite sanitation technologies, and has not been transported through a sewer." Examples of onsite technologies include pit latrines, unsewered public ablution blocks, septic tanks and dry toilets. Fecal sludge can be treated by a variety of methods to render it suitable for reuse in agriculture. These include (usually carried out in combination) dewatering, thickening, drying (in sludge drying beds), composting, pelletization, and anaerobic digestion.

=== Municipal wastewater ===
Reclaimed water can be reused for irrigation, industrial uses, replenishing natural water courses, water bodies, aquifers, and other potable and non-potable uses. These applications, however, focus usually on the water aspect, not on the nutrients and organic matter reuse aspect, which is the focus of "reuse of excreta".

When wastewater is reused in agriculture, its nutrient (nitrogen and phosphorus) content may be useful for additional fertilizer application. Work by the International Water Management Institute and others has led to guidelines on how reuse of municipal wastewater in agriculture for irrigation and fertilizer application can be safely implemented in low income countries.

=== Sewage sludge ===
The use of treated sewage sludge (after treatment also called "biosolids") as a soil conditioner or fertilizer is possible but is a controversial topic in some countries (such as USA, some countries in Europe) due to the chemical pollutants it may contain, such as heavy metals and environmental persistent pharmaceutical pollutants.

Northumbrian Water in the United Kingdom uses two biogas plants to produce what the company calls "poo power"—using sewage sludge to produce energy to generate income. Biogas production has reduced its pre-1996 electricity expenditure of 20 million GBP by about 20%. Severn Trent and Wessex Water also have similar projects.

=== Sludge treatment liquids ===
Sludge treatment liquids (after anaerobic digestion) can be used as an input source for a process to recover phosphorus in the form of struvite for use as fertilizer. For example, the Canadian company Ostara Nutrient Recovery Technologies is marketing a process based on controlled chemical precipitation of phosphorus in a fluidized bed reactor that recovers struvite in the form of crystalline pellets from sludge dewatering streams. The resulting crystalline product is sold to the agriculture, turf, and ornamental plants sectors as fertilizer under the registered trade name "Crystal Green".

=== Peak phosphorus ===
In the case of phosphorus in particular, reuse of excreta is one known method to recover phosphorus to mitigate the potential shortage (also known as "peak phosphorus") of economical mined phosphorus. Mined phosphorus is a limited resource that is used up by fertilizer production, a shortage of which would threaten worldwide food security. Therefore, phosphorus from excreta-based fertilizers is an interesting alternative to fertilizers containing mined phosphate ore.

== Health and environmental aspects of agricultural use ==
=== Pathogens ===
==== Multiple barrier concept for safe use in agriculture ====
Research into how to make the reuse of urine and feces safe in agriculture has been conducted in Sweden since the 1990s. In 2006 the World Health Organization (WHO) provided guidelines on safe reuse of wastewater, excreta, and greywater. The multiple barrier concept to reuse, which is the key cornerstone of this publication, has led to a clear understanding of how excreta reuse can be done safely. The concept is also used in water supply and food production, and is generally understood as a series of treatment steps and other safety precautions to prevent the spread of pathogens.

The degree of treatment required for excreta-based fertilizers before they can be safely used in agriculture depends on several factors. It mainly depends on which other barriers will be put in place, according to the multiple-barrier concept. Such barriers might include selecting a suitable crop, farming methods, fertilizer application methods, farmers' education, and so forth.

For example, in the case of urine-diverting dry toilets secondary treatment of dried feces can be performed at community level rather than at household level and can include thermophilic composting where fecal material is composted at over 50 °C, prolonged storage with a duration of 1.5 to two years, chemical treatment with ammonia from urine to inactivate the pathogens, solar sanitation for further drying or heat treatment to eliminate pathogens.

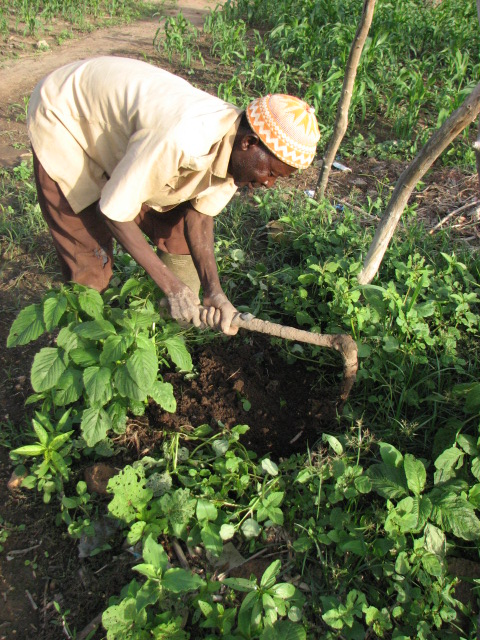
Gardeners of Fada N'Gourma in Burkina Faso apply dry excreta after mixing with other organic fertilizer (donkey manure, cow manure) and pure fertile soil, and after maturing for another 2 to 4 months.

Exposure of farm workers to untreated excreta constitutes a significant health risk due to its pathogen content. There can be a large amount of enteric bacteria, viruses, protozoa, and helminth eggs in feces. This risk also extends to consumers of crops fertilized with untreated excreta. Therefore, excreta needs to be appropriately treated before reuse, and health aspects need to be managed for all reuse applications, as excreta can still contain pathogens even after treatment.

==== Treatment of excreta for pathogen removal ====
Temperature is a treatment parameter with an established relationship to pathogen inactivation across all pathogen groups: Temperatures above 50 °C (122 °F) can inactivate most pathogens. Therefore, thermal sanitization is utilized in several technologies, such as thermophilic composting and thermophilic anaerobic digestion, and potentially in sun drying. Alkaline conditions (pH value above 10) can also deactivate pathogens. This can be achieved with ammonia sanitization or lime treatment.

The treatment of excreta and wastewater for pathogen removal can take place:

- at the toilet itself (for example, urine collected from urine-diverting dry toilets is often treated by simple storage at the household level); or
- at a semi-centralized level (for example, by composting); or
- at a fully centralized level at sewage treatment plants and sewage sludge treatment plants.

==== Indicator organisms ====
As indicator organisms in reuse schemes, helminth eggs are commonly used because they are among the most difficult to destroy in most treatment processes. The multiple barrier approach is recommended, where, e.g., lower levels of treatment may be acceptable when combined with other post-treatment barriers along the sanitation chain.

=== Pharmaceutical residues ===
Excreta from humans contains hormones and pharmaceutical drug residues, which could in theory enter the food chain via fertilized crops, but are currently not fully removed by conventional wastewater treatment plants anyway, and can enter drinking water sources via household wastewater (sewage). In fact, the pharmaceutical residues in the excreta are degraded better in terrestrial systems (soil) than in aquatic systems.

=== Nitrate pollution ===
Only a fraction of the nitrogen-based fertilizers is converted to produce plant matter. The remainder accumulates in the soil or is lost as run-off. This also applies to excreta-based fertilizer since it also contains nitrogen. Excessive nitrogen, which plants do not take up, is transformed into nitrate, which is easily leached. High application rates combined with the high water-solubility of nitrate leads to increased runoff into surface water as well as leaching into groundwater. Nitrate levels above 10 mg/L (10 ppm) in groundwater can cause 'blue baby syndrome' (acquired methemoglobinemia). The nutrients, especially nitrates, in fertilizers can cause problems for ecosystems and for human health if they are washed off into surface water or leached through the soil into groundwater.

== Other uses ==
Apart from use in agriculture, there are other possible uses of excreta. For example, in the case of fecal sludge, it can be treated and then serve as protein (black soldier fly process), fodder, fish food, building materials, and biofuels (biogas from anaerobic digestion, incineration or co-combustion of dried sludge, pyrolysis of fecal sludge, and biodiesel from fecal sludge).

=== Fuel ===
==== Solid fuel, heat, electricity ====
Pilot scale research in Uganda and Senegal has shown that it is viable to use dry feces as for combustion in industry, provided it has been dried to a minimum of 28% dry solids.

Dried sewage sludge can be burned in sludge incineration plants and generate heat and electricity (the waste-to-energy process is one example).

Resource recovery of fecal sludge as a solid fuel has been found to have high market potential in Sub-Saharan Africa.

==== Hydrogen fuel ====
Urine has also been investigated as a potential source of hydrogen fuel. Urine was found to be a suitable wastewater for high rate hydrogen production in a microbial electrolysis cell (MEC).

==== Biogas ====
Small-scale biogas plants are being utilized in many countries, including Ghana, Vietnam and many others. Larger centralized systems are being planned that mix animal and human feces to produce biogas. Biogas is also produced during sewage sludge treatment processes with anaerobic digestion. Here, it can be used for heating the digesters and for generating electricity.

Biogas is an important waste-to-energy resource which plays a huge role in reducing environmental pollution and most importantly in reducing greenhouse gases effect caused by the waste. Utilization of raw material such as human waste for biogas generation is considered beneficial because it does not require additional starters such as microorganism seeds for methane production, and a supply of microorganisms occurs continuously during the feeding of raw materials.

=== Food source for livestock ===
Combination outhouses/feeding troughs were used in several countries since ancient times. They are generally being phased out.

=== Food source to produce protein for animal feed ===
Pilot facilities are being developed for feeding black soldier fly larvae with feces. The mature flies would then be a source of protein to be included in the production of feed for chickens in South Africa.

Black soldier fly (BSF) bio-waste processing is a relatively new treatment technology that has received increasing attention over the last decades. Larvae grown on bio-waste can be a necessary raw material for animal feed production, and can therefore provide revenues for financially applicable waste management systems. In addition, when produced on bio-waste, insect-based feeds can be more sustainable than conventional feeds.

=== Building materials ===
It is known that additions of fecal matter up to 20% by dried weight in clay bricks does not make a significant functional difference to bricks.

=== Precious metals recovery ===
A Japanese sewage treatment facility extracts precious metals from sewage sludge, "high percentage of gold found at the Suwa facility was probably due to the large number of precision equipment manufacturers in the vicinity that use [gold]. The facility recently recorded finding 1,890 grammes of gold per tonne of ash from incinerated sludge. That is a far higher gold content than Japan's Hishikari Mine, one of the world's top gold mines, [...] which contains 20–40 grammes of the precious metal per tonne of ore." This idea was also tested by the US Geological Survey (USGS) which found that the yearly sewage sludge generated by 1 million people contained 13 million dollars' worth of precious metals.

=== Other materials ===
With pyrolysis, urine is turned into a pre-doped, highly porous, carbon material termed "urine carbon" (URC). URC is cheaper than current fuel cell catalysts while performing better.

== History ==
The reuse of excreta as a fertilizer for growing crops has been practiced in many countries for a long time.

== Society and culture ==
=== Economics ===
Debate is ongoing about whether reuse of excreta is cost effective. The terms "sanitation economy" and "toilet resources" have been introduced to describe the potential for selling products made from human feces or urine.

==== Sale of compost ====
The NGO SOIL in Haiti began building urine-diverting dry toilets and composting the waste produced for agricultural use in 2006. SOIL's two composting waste treatment facilities currently transform over 20,000 U.S. gallons (76,000 liters) of human excreta into organic, agricultural-grade compost every month. The compost produced at these facilities is sold to farmers, organizations, businesses, and institutions around the country to help finance SOIL's waste treatment operations. Crops grown with this soil amendment include spinach, peppers, sorghum, maize, and more. Each batch of compost produced is tested for the indicator organism E. coli to ensure that complete pathogen kill has taken place during the thermophilic composting process.

=== Policies ===
There is still a lack of examples of implemented policy where the reuse aspect is fully integrated in policy and advocacy. When considering drivers for policy change in this respect, the following lessons learned should be taken into consideration: Revising legislation does not necessarily lead to functioning reuse systems; it is important to describe the "institutional landscape" and involve all actors; parallel processes should be initiated at all levels of government (i.e. national, regional and local level); country specific strategies and approaches are needed; and strategies supporting newly developed policies need to be developed).

=== Regulatory considerations ===
Regulations such as Global Good Agricultural Practices may hinder export and import of agricultural products that have been grown with the application of human excreta-derived fertilisers.

==== Urine use in organic farming in Europe ====
The European Union allows the use of source separated urine only in conventional farming within the EU, but not yet in organic farming. This is a situation that many agricultural experts, especially in Sweden, would like to see changed. This ban may also reduce the options to use urine as a fertilizer in other countries if they wish to export their products to the EU.

==== Dried feces from urine-diverting dry toilets in the U.S. ====
In the United States, the EPA regulation governs the management of sewage sludge but has no jurisdiction over the byproducts of a urine-diverting dry toilet. Oversight of these materials falls to the states.

== Country examples ==
=== China ===
Treatment disposal of human excreta can be categorized into three types: fertilizer use, discharge and biogas use. Discharge is the disposal of human excreta to soil, septic tank or water body. In China, with the impact of the long tradition, human excreta is often used as fertilizer for crops. The main application methods are direct usage for crops and fruits as basal or top application after fermentation in a ditch for a certain period, compost with crop stalk for basal application and direct usage as feed for fish in ponds. On the other hand, as many people rely on human waste as an agricultural fertilizer, if the waste is not properly treated, the use of night soil may promote the spread of infectious diseases.

=== India ===
Urine is used as organic manure in India. It is also used for making an alcohol-based bio-pesticide: the ammonia within breaks down lignin, allowing plant materials like straw to be more easily fermented into alcohol.

=== Kenya ===
In Mukuru, Kenya, the slum dwellers are worst hit by the sanitation challenge due to a high population density and a lack of supporting infrastructure. Makeshift pit latrines, illegal toilet connections to the main sewer systems and lack of running water to support the flushable toilets present a sanitation nightmare in all Kenyan slums. The NGO Sanergy seeks to provide decent toilet facilities to Mukuru residents and uses the feces and urine from the toilets to provide fertilizer and energy for the market.

=== Uganda ===
Reuse of wastewater in agriculture is a common practice in the developing world. In a study in Kampala, although famers were not using fecal sludge, 8% of farmers were using wastewater sludge as a soil amendment. Compost from animal manure and composted household waste are applied by many farmers as soil conditioners. On the other hand, farmers are already mixing their own feed because of limited trust in the feed industry and the quality of products.

Electricity demand is significantly more than the electricity generation and only a small margin of the population nationally has access to electricity. The pellets produced from fecal sludge are being used in gasification for electricity production. Converting fecal sludge for energy could contribute toward meeting present and future energy needs.

In Tororo District in eastern Uganda—a region with severe land degradation problems—smallholder farmers appreciated urine fertilization as a low-cost, low-risk practice. They found that it could contribute to significant yield increases. The importance of social norms and cultural perceptions needs to be recognized but these are not absolute barriers to adoption of the practice.

=== Ghana ===
In Ghana, the only wide scale implementation is small scale rural digesters, with about 200 biogas plants using human excreta and animal dung as feedstock. Linking up of public toilets with biogas digesters as a way of improving communal hygiene and combating hygiene-related communicable diseases including cholera and dysentery is also a notable solution within Ghana.

== See also ==
- Compost
- Ecological sanitation
- Fecal sludge management
- Manure
- Night soil
- Resource recovery
- Vermifilter toilet
