= Toilet =

Hardware for human waste disposal

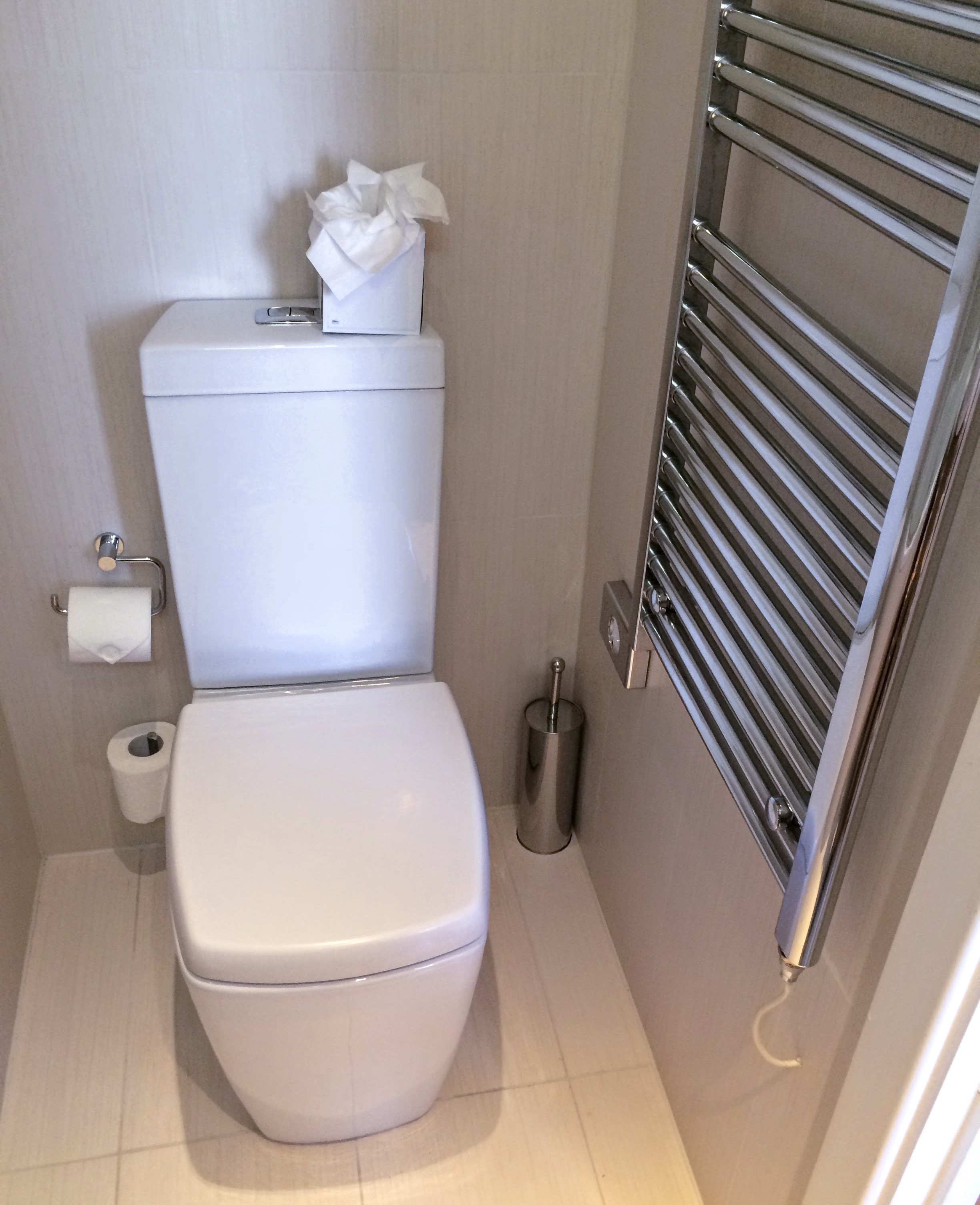
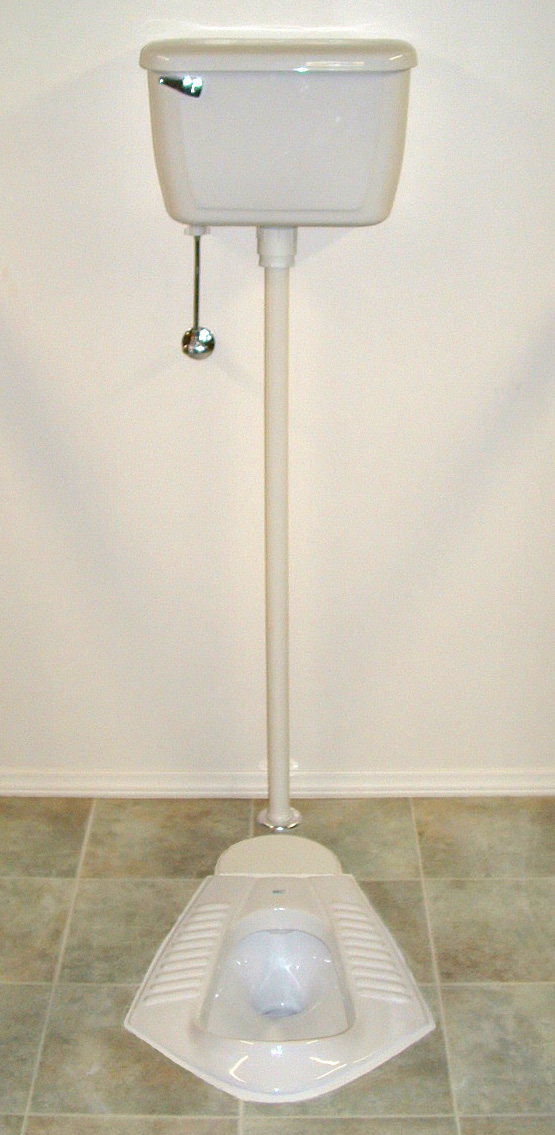
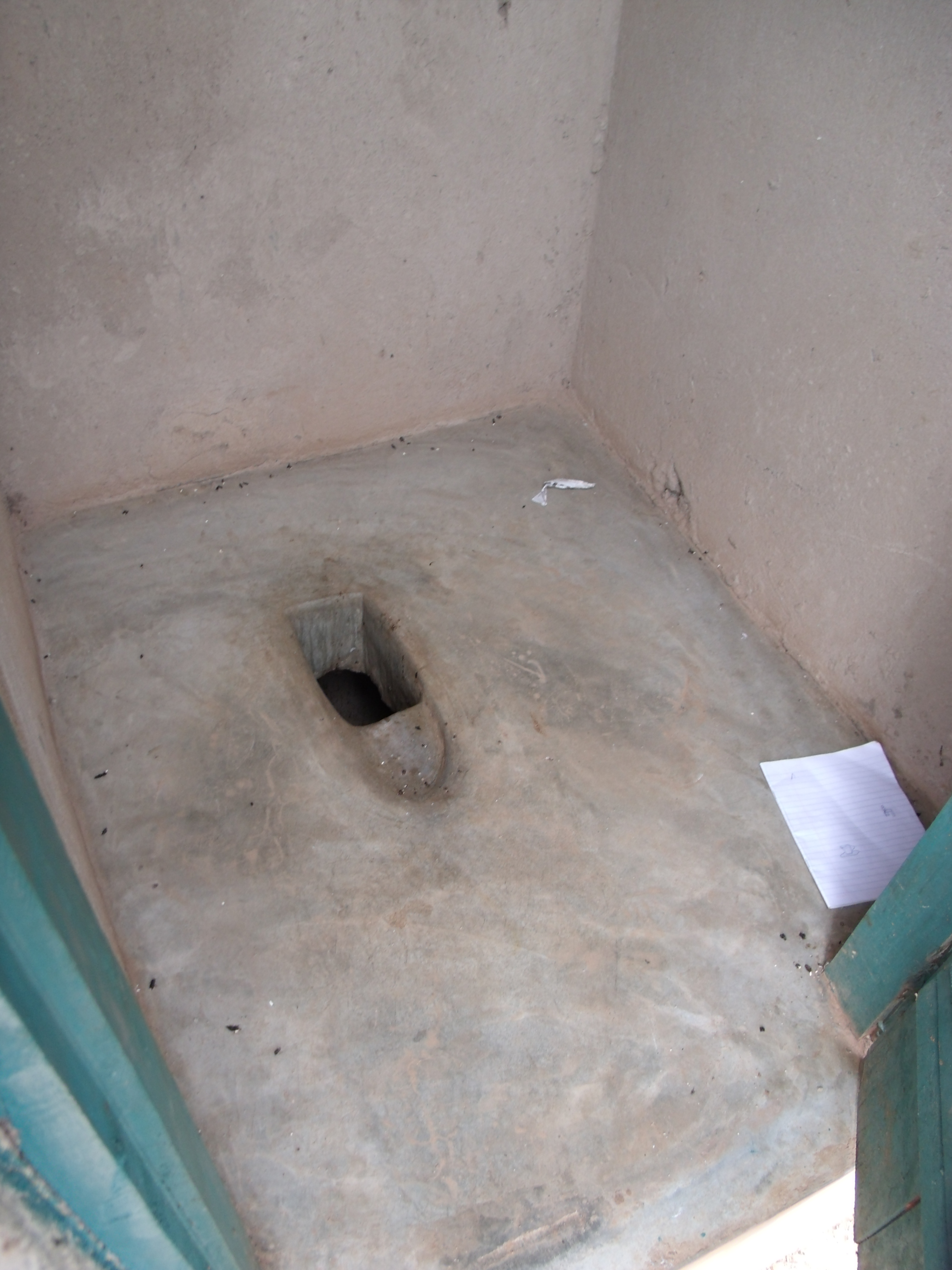
Toilets come in various forms around the world, including flush toilets used by sitting or squatting, and dry toilets like pit latrines.

A toilet (Note: For a full list of English synonyms, see "toilet" in Wiktionary's thesaurus.) is a piece of sanitary hardware (sanitaryware) that collects human waste (urine and feces) and sometimes toilet paper, usually for disposal. Flush toilets use water, while dry or non-flush toilets do not. They can be designed for a sitting position popular in Europe and North America with a toilet seat, with additional considerations for those with disabilities, or for a squatting posture more popular in Asia, known as a squat toilet. In urban areas, flush toilets are usually connected to a sewer system; in isolated areas, to a septic tank. The waste is known as blackwater and the combined effluent, including other sources, is sewage. Dry toilets are connected to a pit, removable container, composting chamber, or other storage and treatment device, including urine diversion with a urine-diverting toilet. "Toilet" or "toilets" is also widely used for rooms containing only one or more toilets and hand-basins. Lavatory is an older word for toilet.

The technology used for modern toilets varies. Toilets are commonly made of ceramic (porcelain), concrete, plastic, or wood. Newer toilet technologies include dual flushing, low flushing, toilet seat warming, self-cleaning, female urinals and waterless urinals. Japan is known for its toilet technology. Airplane toilets are specially designed to operate in the air. The need to maintain anal hygiene post-defecation is universally recognized and toilet paper (often held by a toilet roll holder), which may also be used to wipe the vulva after urination, is widely used (as well as bidets).

In private homes, depending on the region and style, the toilet may exist in the same bathroom as the sink, bathtub, and shower. Another option is to have one room for body washing (also called "bathroom") and a separate one for the toilet and handwashing sink (toilet room). Public toilets (restrooms) consist of one or more toilets (and commonly single urinals or trough urinals) which are available for use by the general public. Products like urinal blocks and toilet blocks help maintain the smell and cleanliness of toilets. Toilet seat covers are sometimes used. Portable toilets (frequently chemical "porta johns") may be brought in for large and temporary gatherings.

Historically, sanitation has been a concern from the earliest stages of human settlements. However, many poor households in developing countries use very basic, and often unhygienic, toilets – and 419 million people have no access to a toilet at all; they must openly defecate and urinate. These issues can lead to the spread of diseases transmitted via the fecal-oral route, or the transmission of waterborne diseases such as cholera and dysentery. Therefore, the United Nations Sustainable Development Goal 6 wants to "achieve access to adequate and equitable sanitation and hygiene for all and end open defecation".

== Overview ==
The number of different types of toilets used worldwide is large, but can be grouped by:

- Having water (which seals in odor) or not (which usually relates to e.g. flush toilet versus dry toilet)
- Being used in a sitting or squatting position (sitting toilet versus squat toilet)
- Being located in the private household or in public (toilet room versus public toilet)

Toilets can be designed to be used in standing, sitting, or squatting postures. Each type has its benefits. The "sitting toilet", however, is essential for those who are movement impaired. Sitting toilets are often referred to as "western-style toilets". Sitting toilets are more convenient than squat toilets for people with disabilities and the elderly.

People use different toilet types based on the country that they are in. In developing countries, access to toilets is also related to people's socio-economic status. Poor people in low-income countries often have no toilets at all and resort to open defecation instead. This is part of the sanitation crisis which international initiatives (such as World Toilet Day) draw attention to.

== With water ==
=== Flush toilet ===
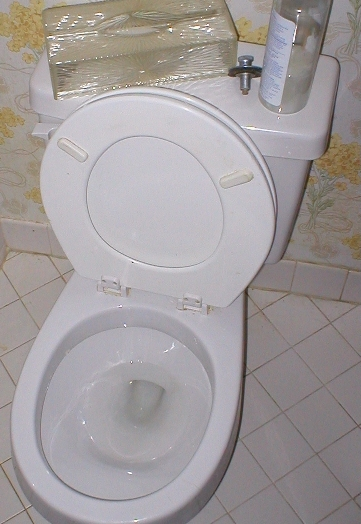
Flush toilet bowl

Toilet flush sound

Fluidmaster Rubber toilet flapper flushed

Black Fluidmaster Toilet fill water valve stopped

A typical flush toilet is a ceramic bowl (pan) connected on the "up" side to a cistern (tank) that enables rapid filling with water, and on the "down" side to a drain pipe that removes the effluent. When a toilet is flushed, the sewage should flow into a septic tank or into a system connected to a sewage treatment plant. However, in many developing countries, this treatment step does not take place.

The water in the toilet bowl is connected to a pipe shaped like an upside-down U. One side of the U channel is arranged as a siphon tube longer than the water in the bowl is high. The siphon tube connects to the drain. The bottom of the drain pipe limits the height of the water in the bowl before it flows down the drain. The water in the bowl acts as a barrier to sewer gas entering the building. Sewer gas escapes through a vent pipe attached to the sewer line.

The amount of water used by conventional flush toilets usually makes up a significant portion of personal daily water usage. However, modern low flush toilet designs allow the use of much less water per flush. Dual flush toilets allow the user to select between a flush for urine or feces, saving a significant amount of water over conventional units. One type of dual flush system allows the flush handle to be pushed up for one kind of flush and down for the other, whereas another design is to have two buttons, one for urination and the other for defecation. In some places, users are encouraged not to flush after urination. Flushing toilets can be plumbed to use greywater (water that was previously used for washing dishes, laundry, and bathing) rather than potable water (drinking water). Some modern toilets pressurize the water in the tank, which initiates flushing action with less water usage. Flush toilets on boats and ships (called the head) may be flushed with seawater or fresh water.

Another variant is the pour-flush toilet. This type of flush toilet has no cistern but is flushed manually with a few liters of a small bucket. The flushing can use as little as 2–3 litres (0.44–0.66 imp gal; 0.53–0.79 US gal). This type of toilet is common in many Asian countries. The toilet can be connected to one or two pits, in which case it is called a "pour flush pit latrine" or a "twin pit pour flush to pit latrine". It can also be connected to a septic tank.

==== Twin pit designs ====
Design of a twin pit latrine.

Twin pit latrines use two pits used alternatively, when one pit gets full over a few months or years. The pits are of an adequate size to accommodate a volume of waste generated over one or two years. This allows the contents of the full pit enough time to transform into a partially sanitized, soil-like material that can be manually excavated. There is a risk of groundwater pollution when pits are located in areas with a high or variable water table, and/or fissures or cracks in the bedrock.

=== Vacuum toilet ===
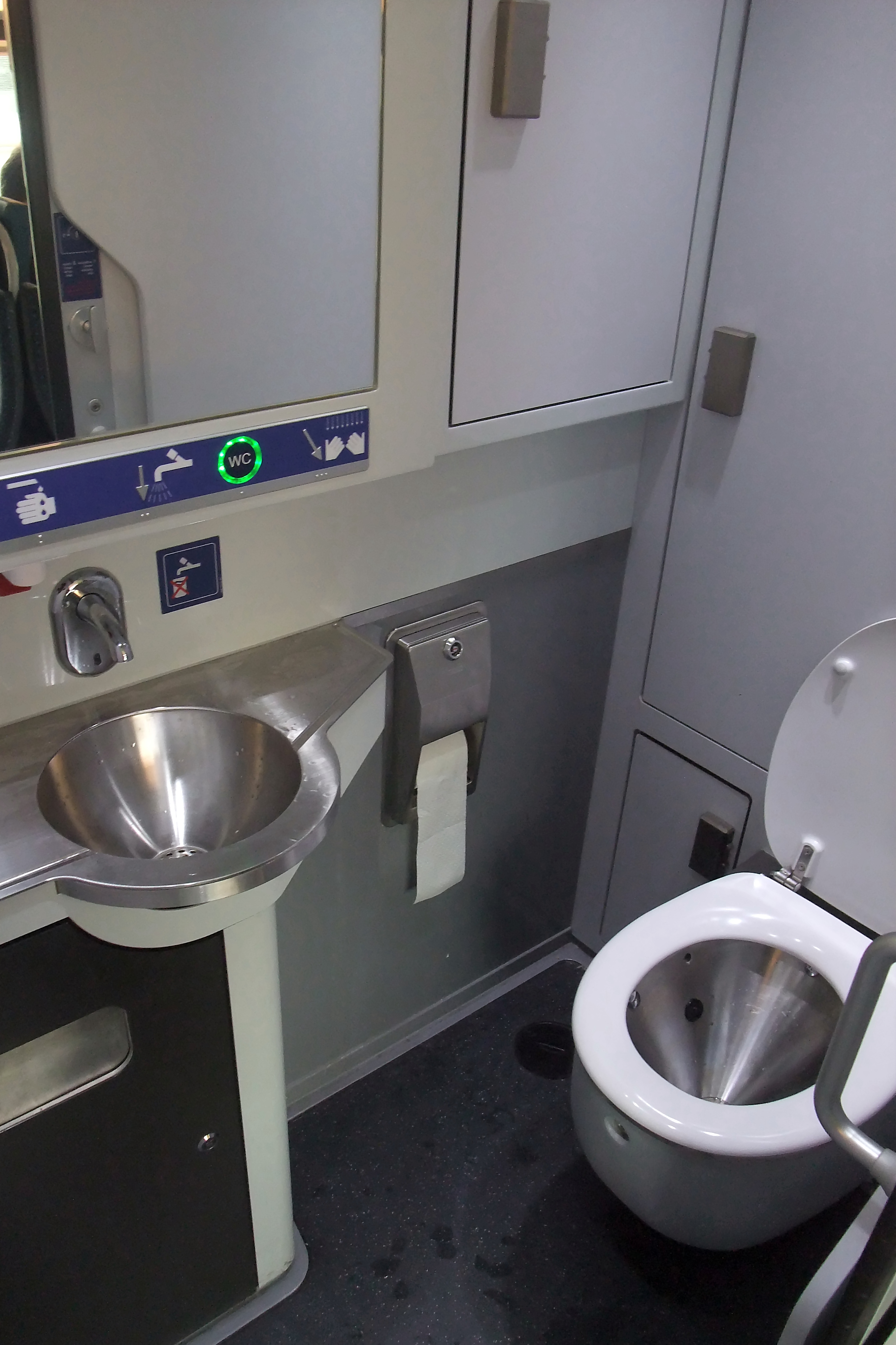
Vacuum toilet in a train in Switzerland.

A vacuum toilet is a flush toilet that is connected to a vacuum sewer system, and removes waste by suction. They may use very little water (less than a quarter of a liter per flush) or none, (as in waterless urinals). Some flush with coloured disinfectant solution rather than with water. They may be used to separate blackwater and greywater, and process them separately (for instance, the fairly dry blackwater can be used for biogas production, or in a composting toilet).

Passenger train toilets, aircraft lavatories, bus toilets, and ships with plumbing often use vacuum toilets. The lower water usage saves weight, and avoids water slopping out of the toilet bowl in motion. Aboard vehicles, a portable collection chamber is used; if it is filled by positive pressure from an intermediate vacuum chamber, it need not be kept under vacuum.

=== Floating toilet ===
A floating toilet is essentially a toilet on a platform built above or floating on the water. Instead of excreta going into the ground they are collected in a tank or barrel. To reduce the amount of excreta that needs to be hauled to shore, many use urine diversion. The floating toilet was developed for residents without quick access to land or connection to a sewer systems. It is also used in areas subjected to prolonged flooding. The need for this type of toilet is high in areas like Cambodia.

== Without water ==
A dry toilet (or non-flush toilet, no flush toilet or toilet without a flush) is a toilet which, unlike a flush toilet, does not use flush water. Dry toilets do not use water to move excreta along or block odors. They do not produce sewage, and are not connected to a sewer system or septic tank. Instead, excreta falls through a drop hole.

=== Pit latrine ===
A pit latrine, also known as pit toilet, is a type of toilet that collects human waste in a hole in the ground. Urine and feces enter the pit through a drop hole in the floor, which might be connected to a toilet seat or squatting pan for user comfort. Pit latrines can be built to function without water (dry toilet) or they can have a water seal (pour-flush pit latrine). When properly built and maintained, pit latrines can decrease the spread of disease by reducing the amount of human feces in the environment from open defecation. This decreases the transfer of pathogens between feces and food by flies. These pathogens are major causes of infectious diarrhea and intestinal worm infections. Infectious diarrhea resulted in about 700,000 deaths in children under five years old in 2011 and 250 million lost school days. Pit latrines are a low-cost method of separating feces from people.

=== Vault toilet ===
A vault toilet is a non-flush toilet with a sealed container (or vault) buried in the ground to receive the excreta, all of which is contained underground until it is removed by pumping. A vault toilet is distinguished from a pit latrine because the waste accumulates in the vault instead of seeping into the underlying soil.

=== Urine-diverting toilet ===
A urine-diverting dry toilet (UDDT) is a type of dry toilet with urine diversion that can be used to provide safe, affordable sanitation in a variety of contexts worldwide. The separate collection of feces and urine without any flush water has many advantages, such as odor-free operation and pathogen reduction by drying. While dried feces and urine harvested from UDDTs can be and routinely are used in agriculture (respectively, as a soil amendment and nutrient-rich fertilizer—this practice being known as reuse of excreta in agriculture), many UDDT installations do not apply any sort of recovery scheme. The UDDT is an example of a technology that can be used to achieve a sustainable sanitation system. This dry excreta management system (or "dry sanitation" system) is an alternative to pit latrines and flush toilets, especially where water is scarce, a connection to a sewer system and centralized wastewater treatment plant is not feasible or desired, fertilizer and soil conditioner are needed for agriculture, or groundwater pollution should be minimized.

=== Portable toilet ===
A portable or mobile toilet (colloquial terms: thunderbox, porta-john, porta-potty or porta-loo) is any type of toilet that can be moved around, some by one person, some by mechanical equipment such as a truck and crane. Most types do not require any pre-existing services or infrastructure, such as sewerage, and are completely self-contained. The portable toilet is used in a variety of situations, for example in urban slums of developing countries, at festivals, for camping, on boats, on construction sites, and at film locations and large outdoor gatherings where there are no other facilities. Most portable toilets are unisex single units with privacy ensured by a simple lock on the door. Some portable toilets are small molded plastic or fiberglass portable rooms with a lockable door and a receptacle to catch the human excreta in a container.

=== Chemical toilet ===
A chemical toilet collects human waste in a holding tank and uses chemicals to minimize odors. They do not require a connection to a water supply and are used in a wide variety of situations. These toilets are usually, but not always, self-contained and movable. A chemical toilet is structured around a relatively small tank, which requires frequent emptying. It is not connected to a hole in the ground (like a pit latrine), nor to a septic tank, nor is it plumbed into a municipal system leading to a sewage treatment plant. When the tank is emptied, the contents are usually pumped into a sanitary sewer or directly to a treatment plant.

The enclosed portable toilets used on construction sites and at large gatherings such as music festivals are well-known types of chemical toilets. As they are usually used for short periods and because of their high prices, they are mostly rented rather than bought, often including servicing and cleaning.

=== Toilet fed to animals ===
The pig toilet, which consists of a toilet linked to a pigsty by a chute, is still in use to a limited extent. It was common in rural China, and was known in Japan, Korea, and India. The fish pond toilet depends on the same principle, of livestock (often carp) eating human excreta directly.

=== "Flying toilet" ===
A flying toilet is a facetious name for a plastic bag that is used as a simple collection device for human faeces when there is a lack of proper toilets and people are forced to practise open defecation. The filled and tied plastic bags are then discarded in ditches or on the roadside. Associated especially with slums, they are called flying toilets "because when you have filled them, you throw them as far away as you can".

== Squat toilets ==
A squat toilet (or squatting toilet) is a toilet used by squatting, rather than sitting. This means that the posture for defecation and urination is to place one foot on each side of the toilet drain or hole and to squat over it. There are several types of squat toilets, but they all consist essentially of a toilet pan or bowl at floor level. Such a toilet pan is also called a "squatting pan". A squat toilet may use a water seal and therefore be a flush toilet, or it can be without a water seal and therefore be a dry toilet. The term "squat" refers only to the expected defecation posture and not any other aspects of toilet technology, such as whether it is water flushed or not.

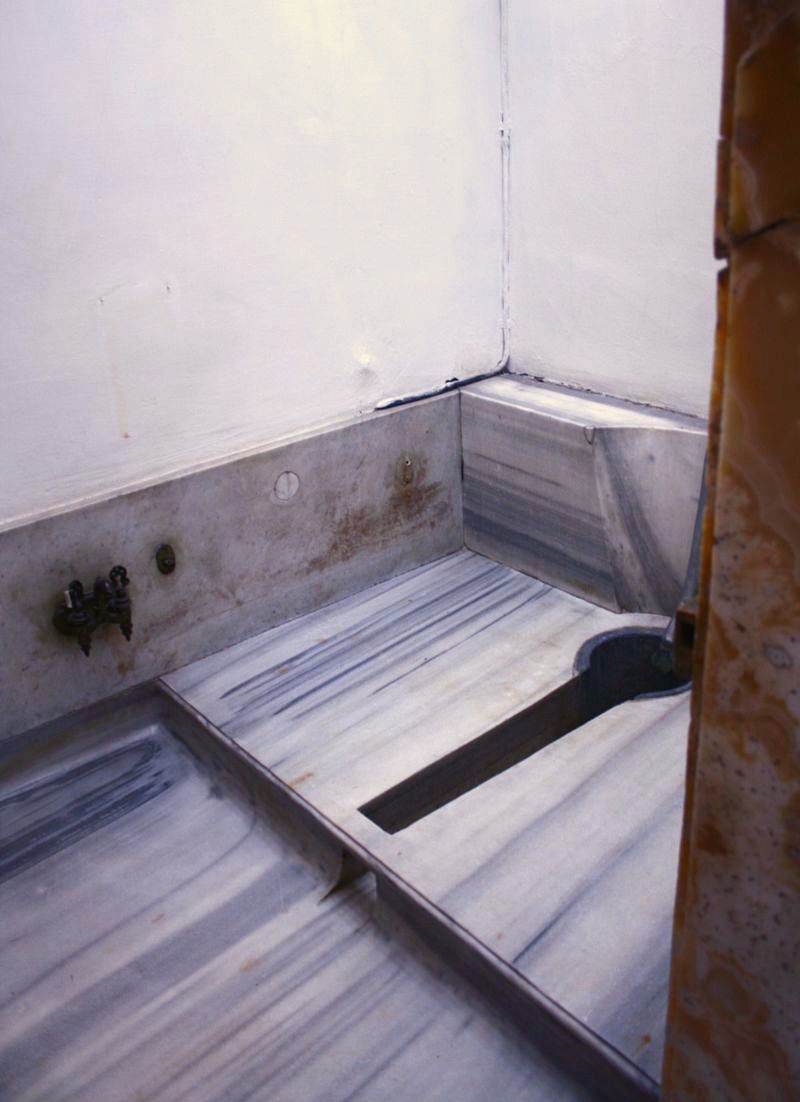
At Topkapı Palace, Turkey

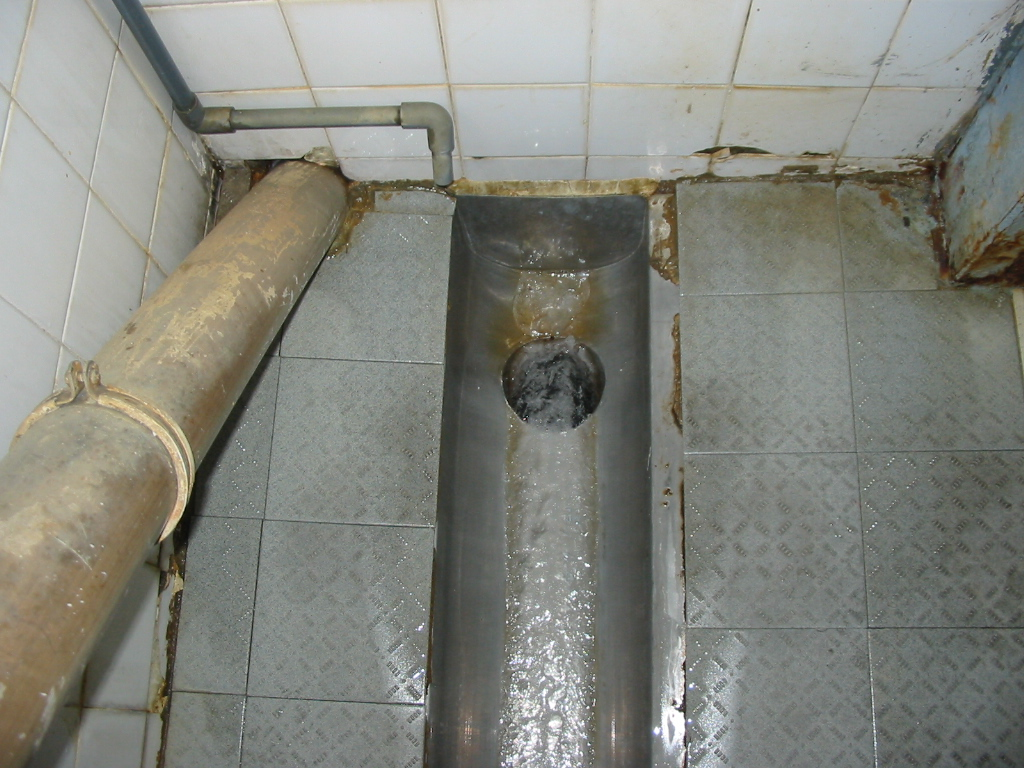
Old-style squat toilet (Hong Kong)

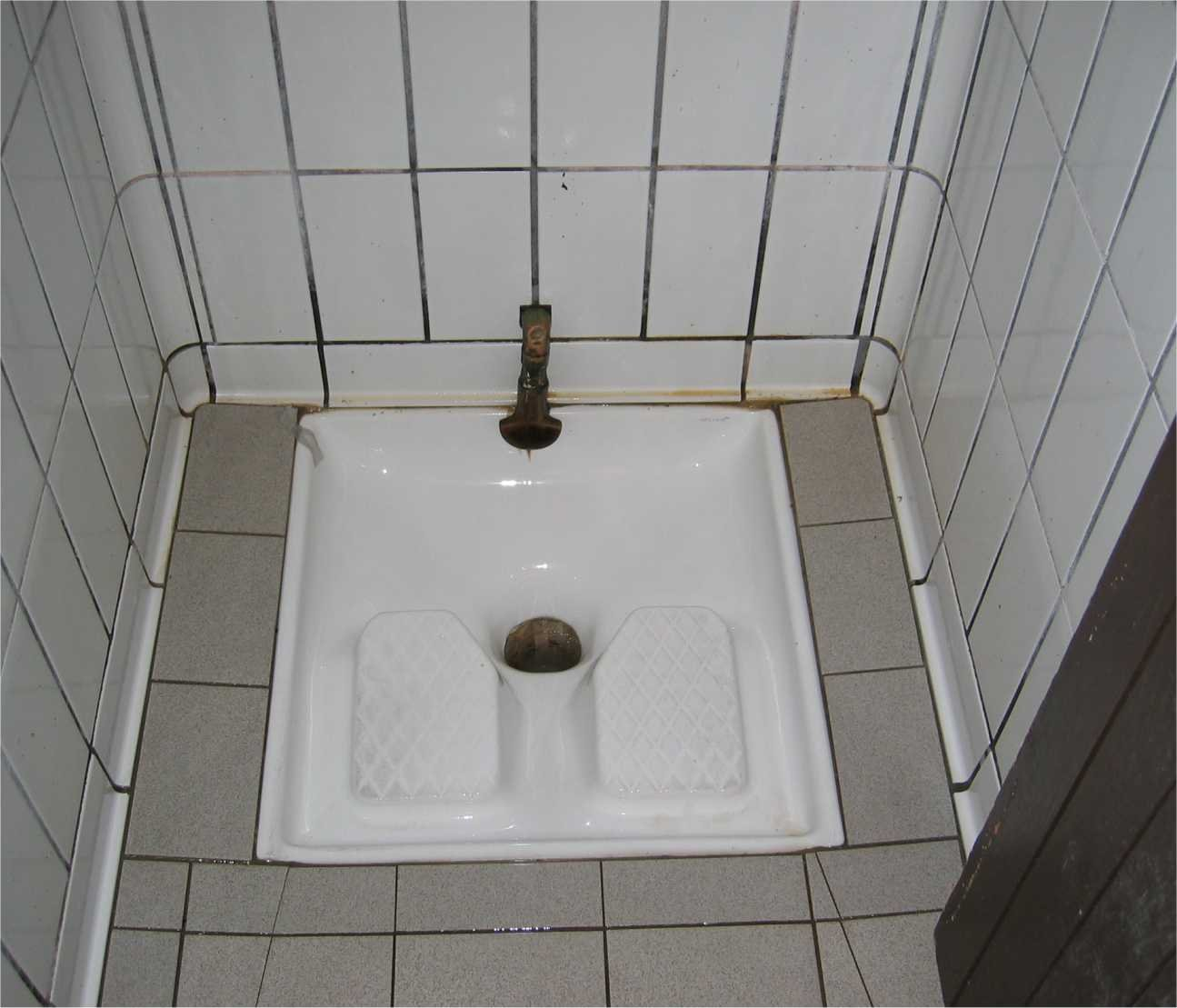
In France

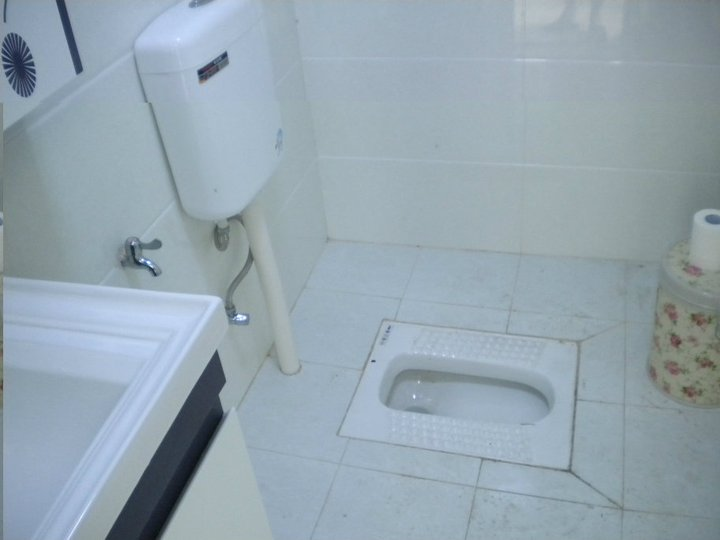
Porcelain squat toilet with water tank for flushing (Wuhan, China)

== Usage ==
=== Urination ===
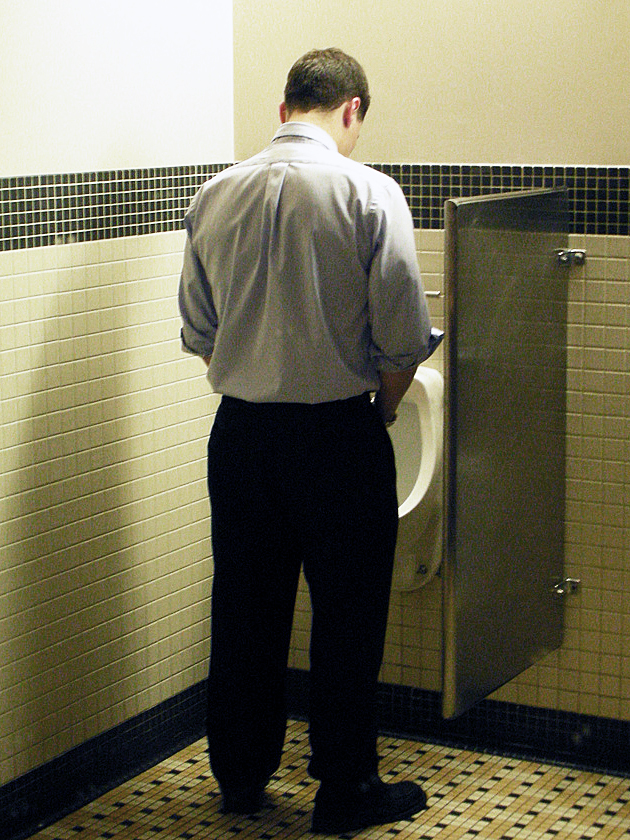
A man seen from behind urinating while standing.

There are cultural differences in socially accepted and preferred voiding positions for urination around the world: in the Middle East and Asia, the squatting position is more prevalent, while in the Western world the standing and sitting position are more common.

=== Anal cleansing habits ===
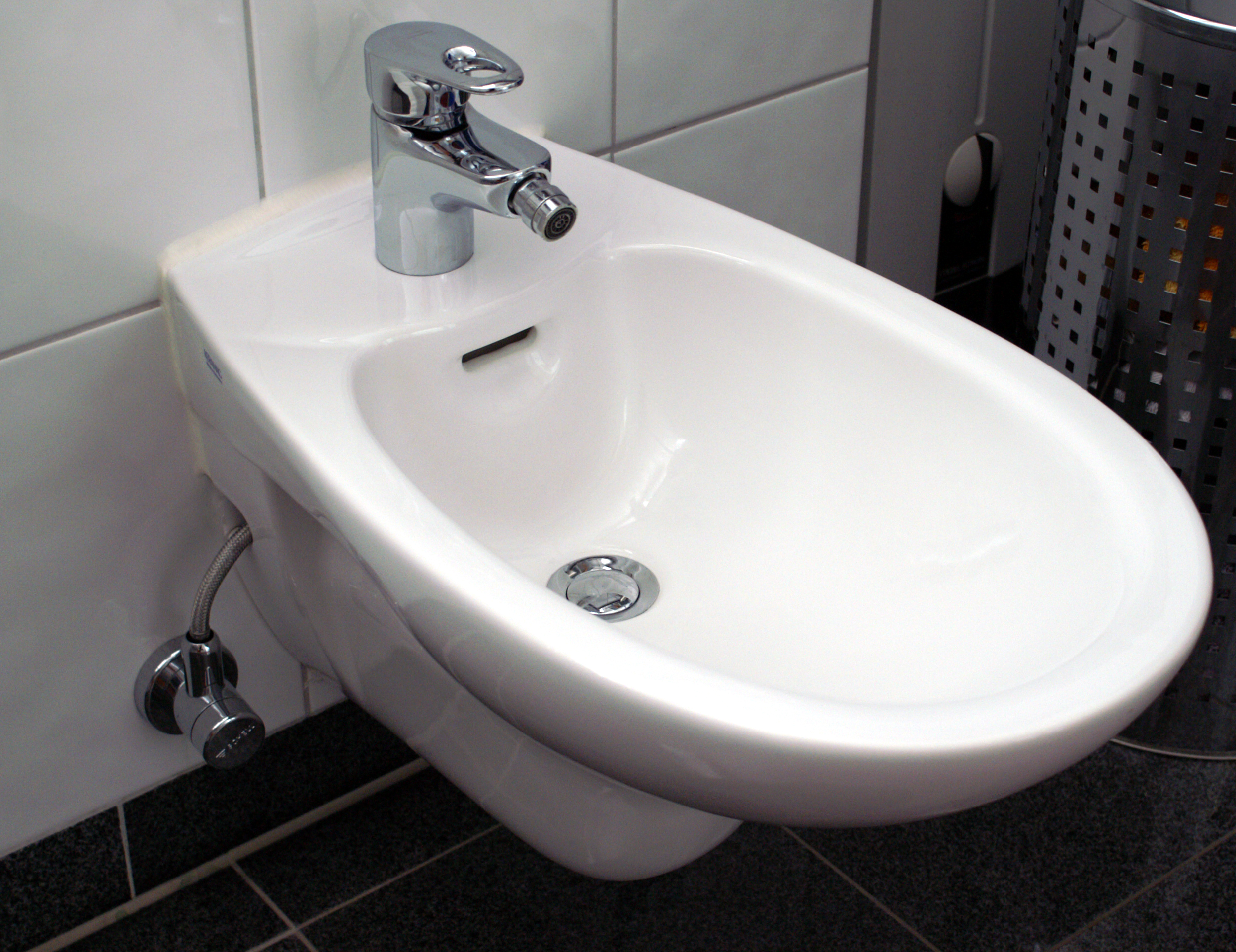
A modern bidet of the traditional type, available in many southern European and South American countries.

In the Western world, the most common method of cleaning the anal area after defecation is by toilet paper or sometimes by using a bidet. In many Muslim countries, the facilities are designed to enable people to follow Islamic toilet etiquette Qaḍāʼ al-Ḥājah. For example, a bidet shower may be plumbed in. The left hand is used for cleansing, for which reason that hand is considered impolite or polluted in many Asian countries.

The use of water in many Christian countries is due in part to the biblical toilet etiquette which encourages washing after all instances of defecation. The bidet is common in predominantly Catholic countries where water is considered essential for anal cleansing, and in some traditionally Orthodox and Lutheran countries such as Greece and Finland respectively, where bidet showers are common.

There are toilets on the market with seats having integrated spray mechanisms for anal and genital water sprays (see for example Toilets in Japan). This can be useful for the elderly or people with disabilities.

=== Accessible toilets ===
An accessible toilet is designed to accommodate people with physical disabilities, such as age related limited mobility or inability to walk due to impairments. Additional measures to add toilet accessibility are providing more space and grab bars to ease transfer to and from the toilet seat, including enough room for a caregiver if necessary.

=== Public toilets ===
A public toilet, also known as a restroom, bathroom or washroom, is a room or small building with toilets (or urinals) and sinks for use by the general public. The facilities are available to customers, travelers, employees of a business, school pupils or prisoners. Public toilets are typically found in many different places: inner-city locations, offices, factories, schools, universities and other places of work and study. Similarly, museums, cinemas, bars, restaurants, and entertainment venues usually provide public toilets. Railway stations, filling stations, and long-distance public transport vehicles such as trains, ferries, and planes usually provide toilets for general use. Portable toilets are often available at large outdoor events.

=== Communication through toilets ===
In prisons, inmates may utilize toilets and the associated plumbing to communicate messages and pass products. The acoustic properties of communicating through the toilet bowl, known as toilet talk, potty talk, toilet telephone is influenced by flush patterns and bowl water volumes. Prisoners may also send binary signals by ringing the sewage or water pipes. Toilet talk enables communication for those in solitary confinement. Toilets have been subject to wiretaps.

== Public health aspects ==
Toilets should be innovated and "reinvented" to properly address the global sanitation crisis says the Bill and Melinda Gates Foundation

To this day, 1 billion people in developing countries have no toilets in their homes and are resorting to open defecation instead. Therefore, it is one of the targets of Sustainable Development Goal 6 to provide toilets (sanitation services) to everyone by 2030.

Toilets are one important element of a sanitation system, although other elements are also needed: transport, treatment, disposal, or reuse. Diseases, including Cholera, which still affects some 3 million people each year, can be largely prevented when effective sanitation and water treatment prevents fecal matter from contaminating waterways, groundwater, and drinking water supplies.

== History ==
=== Ancient history ===
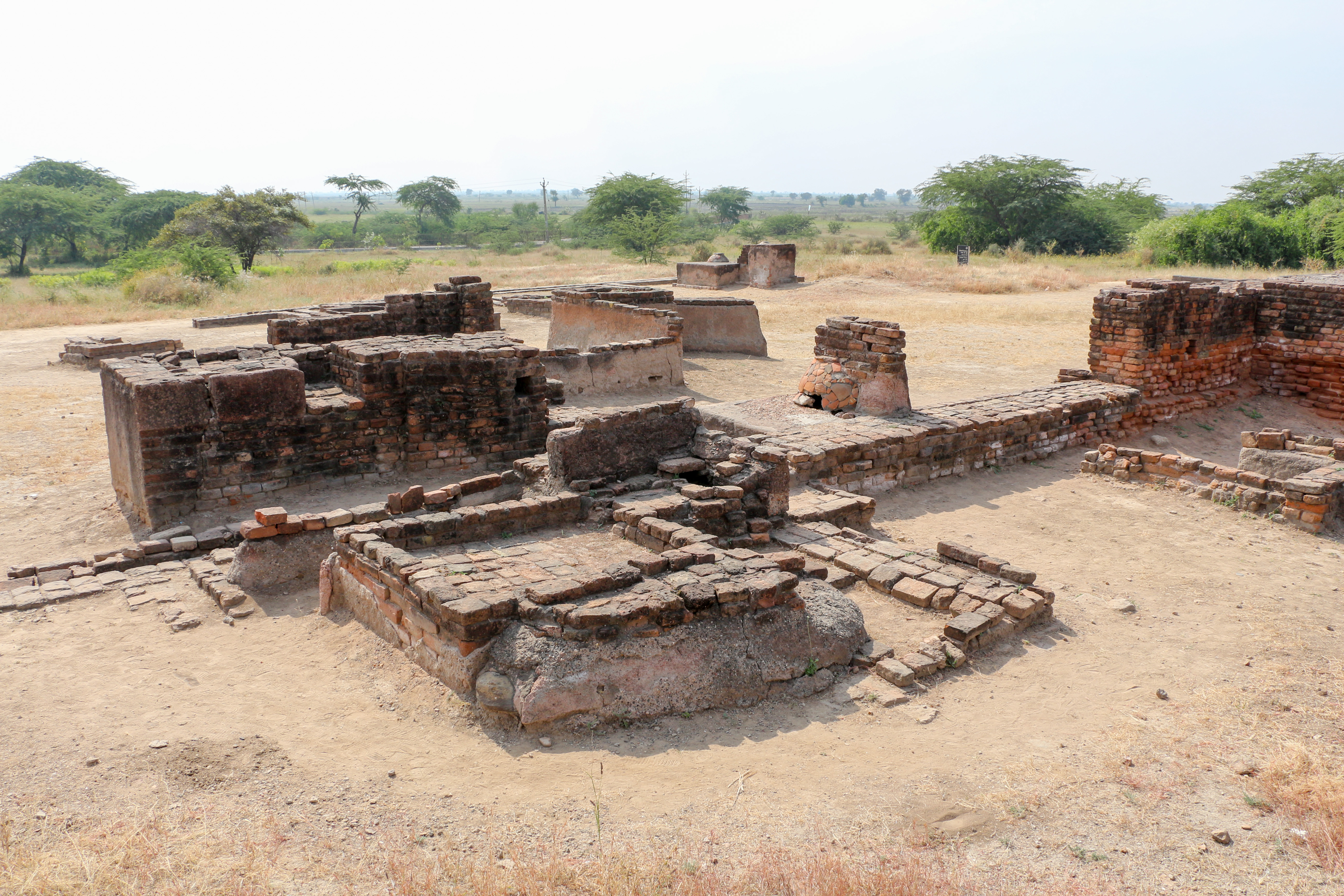
Sewage and toilet structures in the city of Lothal of the Indus Valley Civilisation in around 2350 BC.

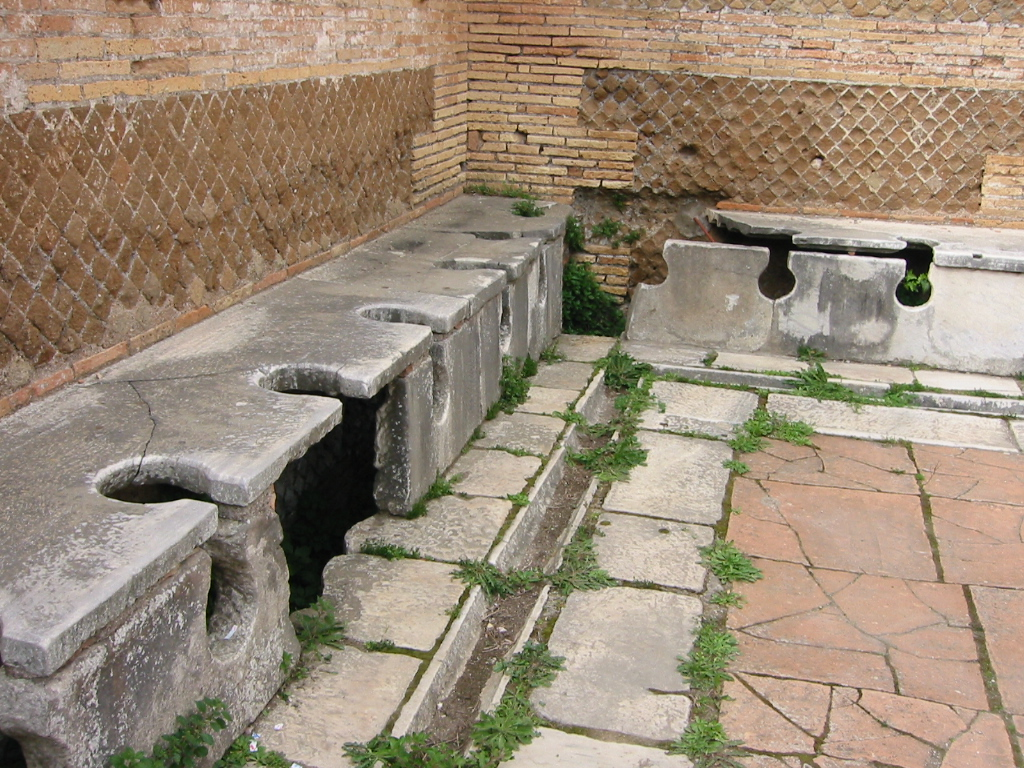
Roman public toilets, Ostia Antica.

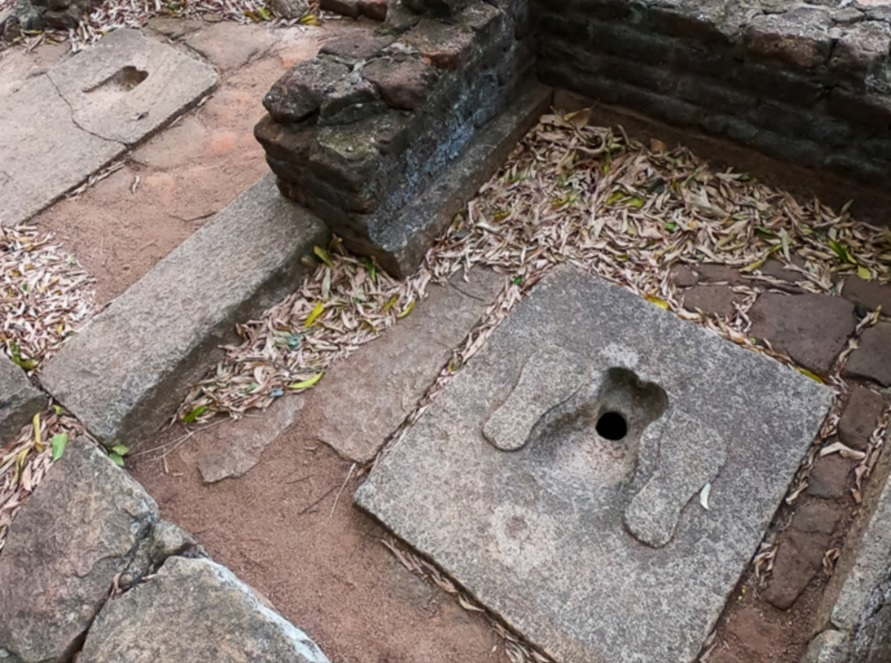
Squatting toilets at Kaludiya Pokuna archeological site, Sri Lanka.

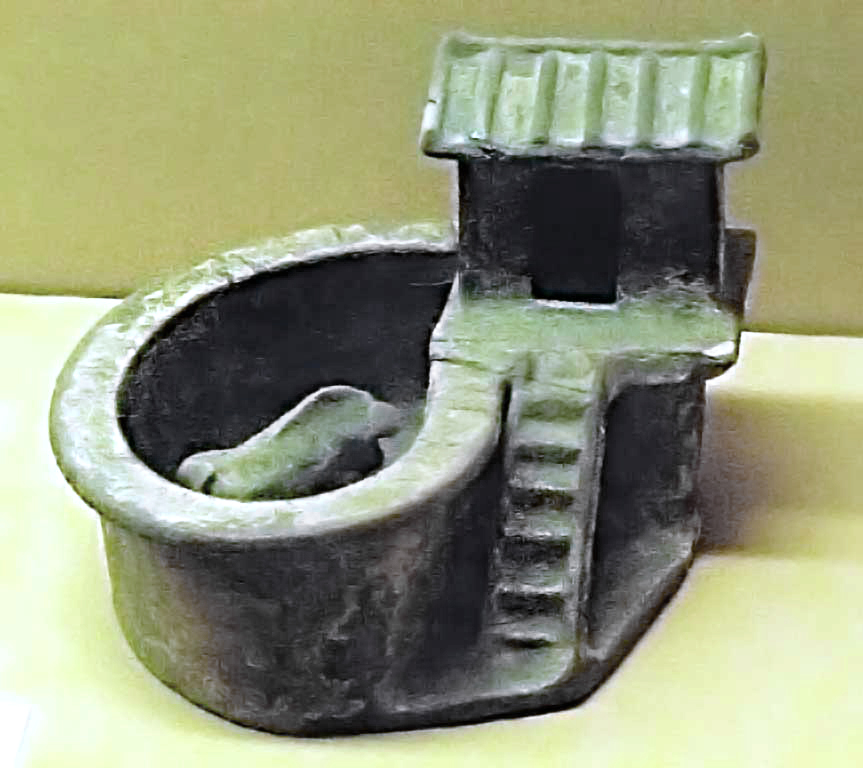
Model of toilet with pigsty, China, Eastern Han dynasty 25–220 AD

The fourth millennium BC would witness the invention of clay pipes, sewers, and toilets, in Mesopotamia, with the city of Uruk today exhibiting the earliest known internal pit toilet, from c. 3200 BC. The Neolithic village of Skara Brae contains examples, c. 3000 BC, of internal small rooms over a communal drain, rather than pit. The Indus Valley Civilisation in northwestern India and Pakistan was home to the world's first known urban sanitation systems. In Mohenjo-Daro (c. 2800 BC), toilets were built into the outer walls of homes. These toilets had vertical chutes, via which waste was disposed of into cesspits or street drains. In the Indus city of Lothal (c. 2350 BC), houses belonging to the upper class had private toilets connected to a covered sewer network constructed of brickwork held together with a gypsum-based mortar that emptied either into the surrounding water bodies or alternatively into cesspits, the latter of which were regularly emptied and cleaned.

Other very early toilets that used flowing water to remove the waste are found at Skara Brae in Orkney, Scotland, which was occupied from about 3100 BC until 2500 BC. Some of the houses there have a drain running directly beneath them, and some of these had a cubicle over the drain. Around the 18th century BC, toilets started to appear in Minoan Crete, Pharaonic Egypt, and ancient Persia.

In 2012, archaeologists found what is believed to be Southeast Asia's earliest latrine during the excavation of a Neolithic village in the Rạch Núi archaeological site, southern Vietnam. The toilet, dating back 1500 BC, yielded important clues about early Southeast Asian society. More than 30 coprolites, containing fish and shattered animal bones, provided information on the diet of humans and dogs, and on the types of parasites each had to contend with.

In Sri Lanka, the techniques of the construction of toilets and lavatories developed over several stages. A highly developed stage in this process is discernible in the constructions at the Abhayagiri complex in Anuradhapura where toilets and baths dating back to 2nd century BC to 3rd century CE are known, later forms of toilets from 5th century CE to 13th century CE in Polonnaruwa and Anuradhapura had elaborate decorative motifs carved around the toilets. Several types of toilets were developed; these include lavatories with ring-well pits, underground terracotta pipes that lead to septic pits, urinary pits with large bottomless clay pots of decreasing size placed one above the other. These pots under urinals contained "sand, lime and charcoal" through which urine filtered down to the earth in a somewhat purified form.

In Roman civilization, latrines using flowing water were sometimes part of public bath houses. Roman latrines, like the ones pictured here, are commonly thought to have been used in the sitting position. The Roman toilets were probably elevated to raise them above open sewers which were periodically "flushed" with flowing water, rather than elevated for sitting. Romans and Greeks also used chamber pots, which they brought to meals and drinking sessions. Johan J. Mattelaer said, "Plinius has described how there were large receptacles in the streets of cities such as Rome and Pompeii into which chamber pots of urine were emptied. The urine was then collected by fullers." (Fulling was a vital step in textile manufacture.)

The Han dynasty in China two thousand years ago used pig toilets.

=== Post-classical history ===
Garderobes were toilets used in the Post-classical history, most commonly found in upper-class dwellings. Essentially, they were flat pieces of wood or stone spanning from one wall to the other, with one or more holes to sit on. These were above chutes or pipes that discharged outside the castle or Manor house. Garderobes would be placed in areas away from bedrooms because of the smell and also near kitchens or fireplaces to keep their enclosures warm.

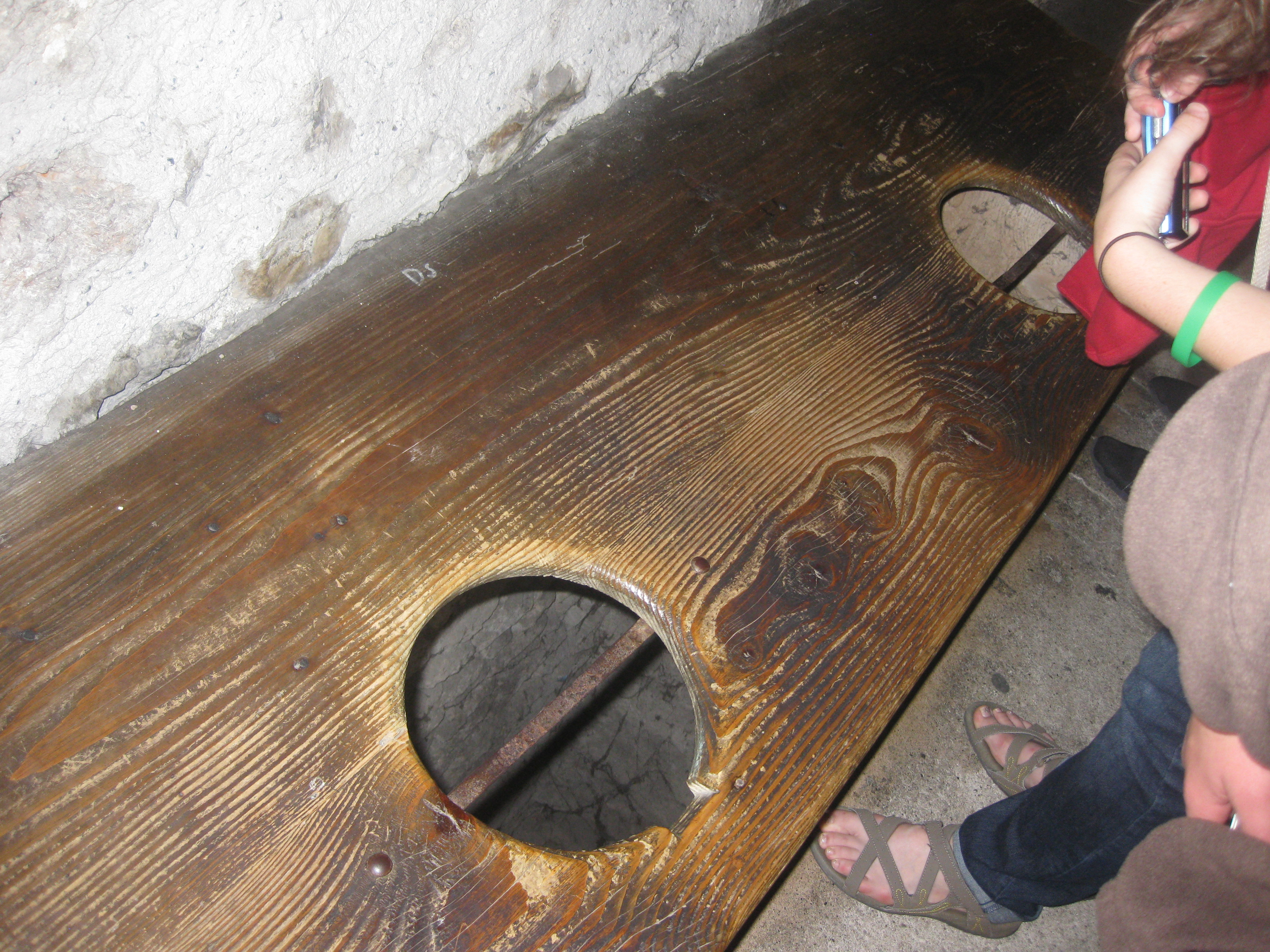
Garderobe seat openings

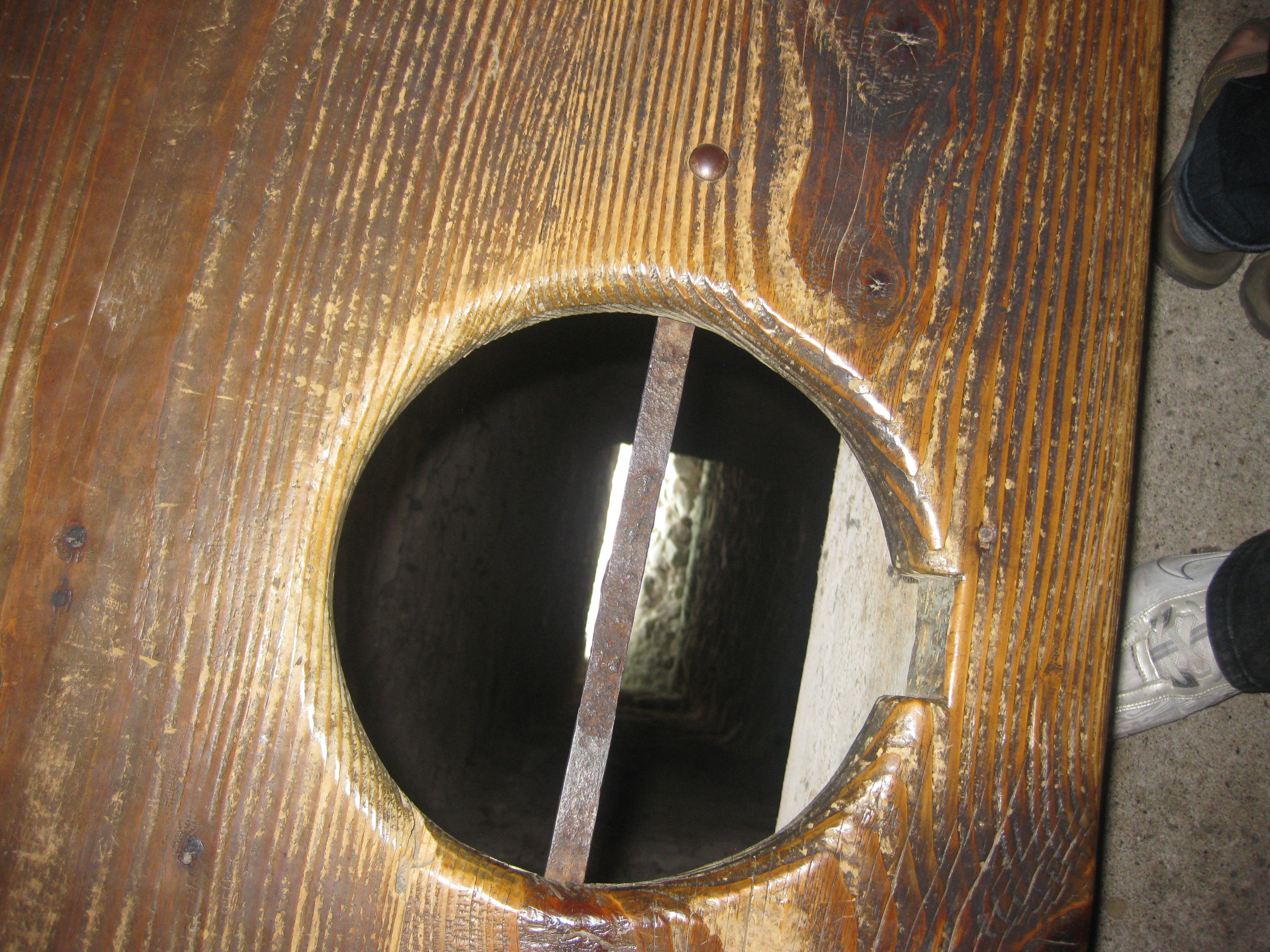
View looking down into garderobe seat opening

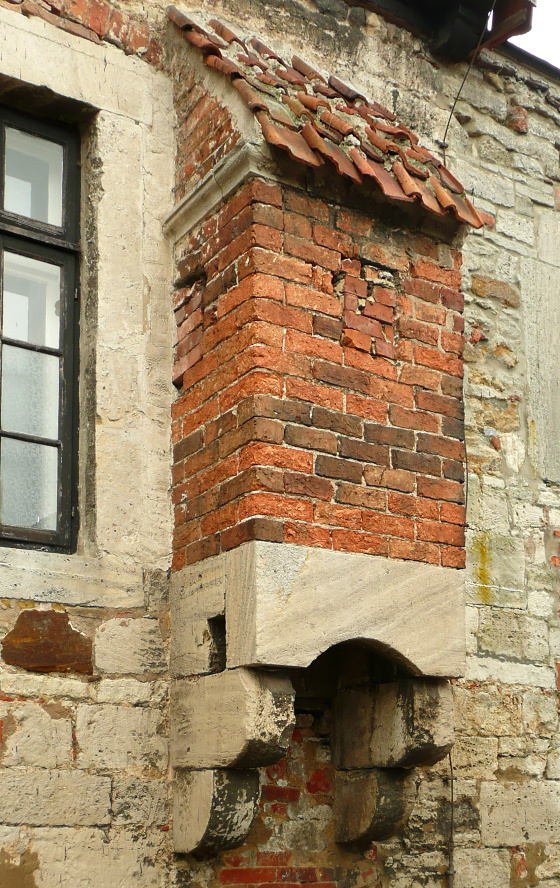
Exterior view of garderobe at Campen Castle

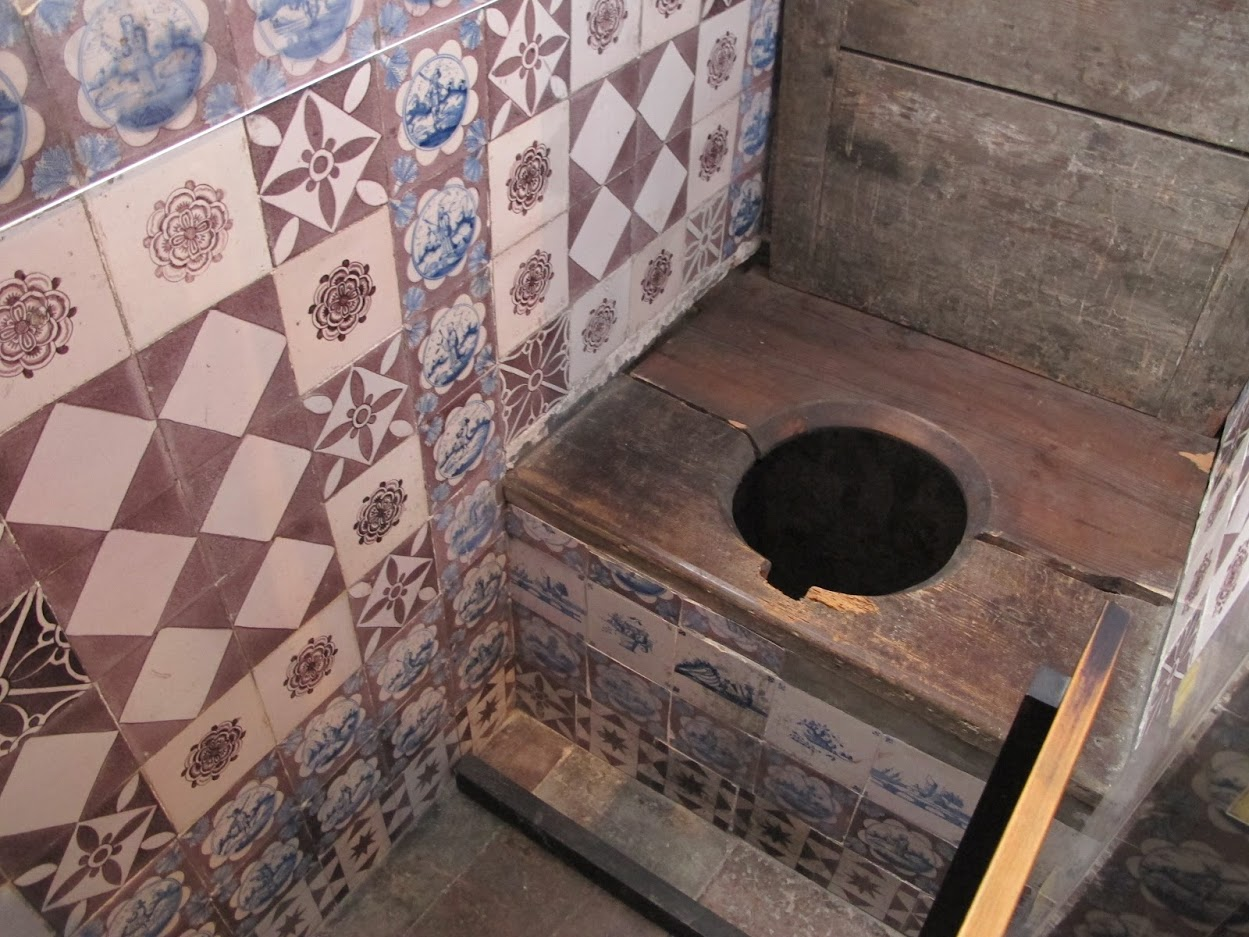
Toilet in Rosenborg Castle Copenhagen

The other main way of handling toilet needs was the chamber pot, a receptacle, usually of ceramic or metal, into which one would excrete waste. This method was used for hundreds of years; shapes, sizes, and decorative variations changed throughout the centuries. Chamber pots were in common use in Europe from ancient times, even being taken to the Middle East by medieval pilgrims.

=== Modern history ===
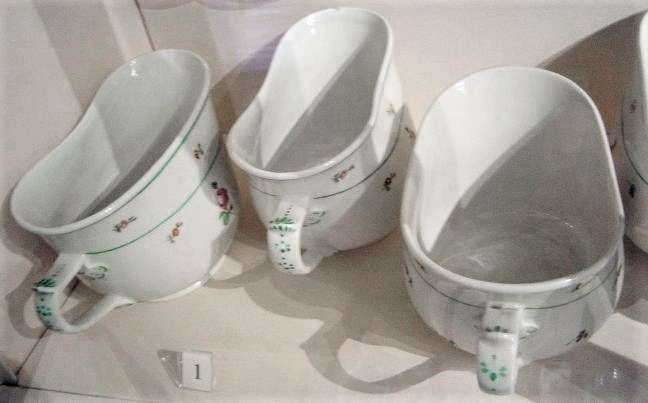
Bourdaloue chamber pots from the Austrian Imperial household

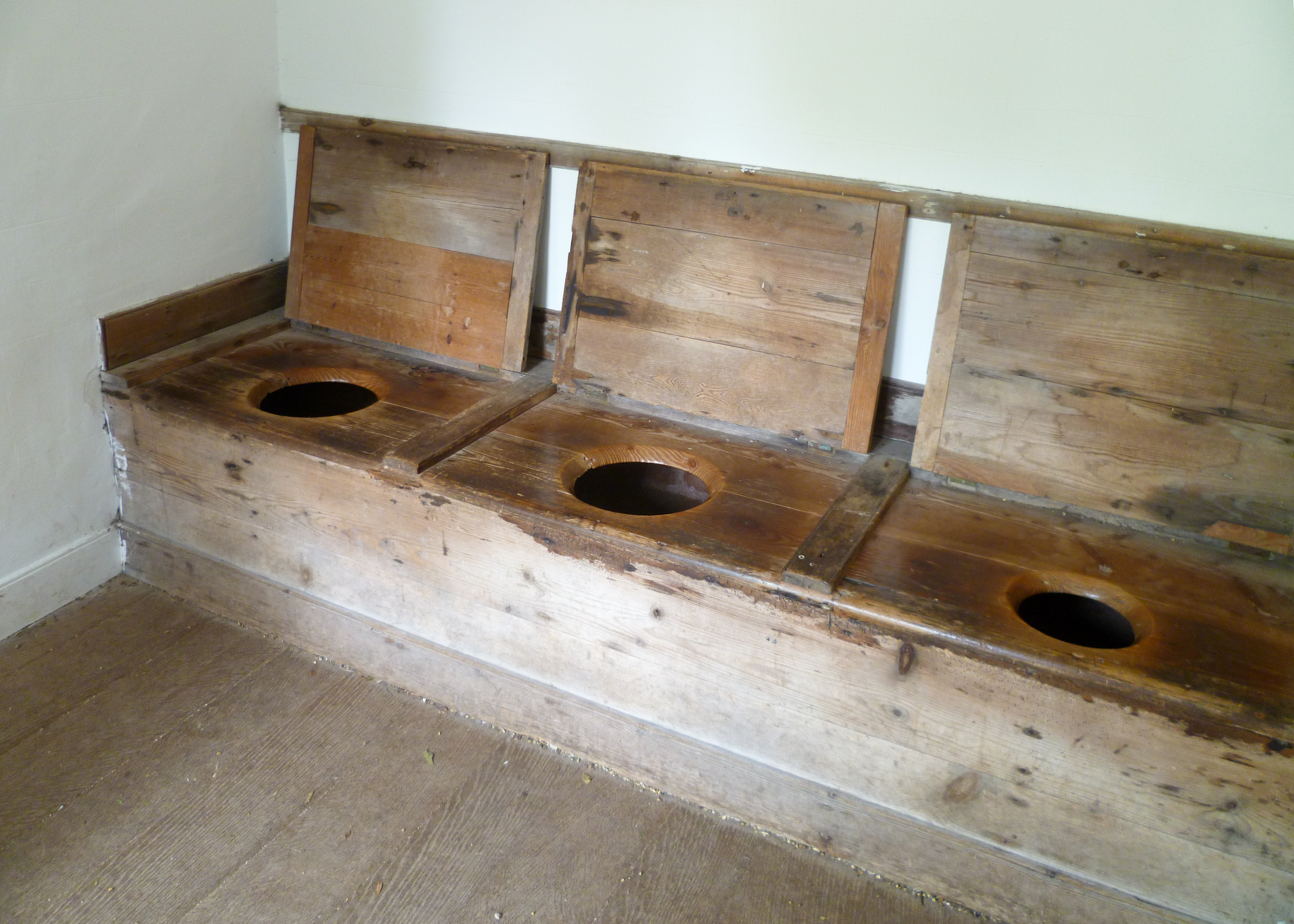
Early 18th century British three-seat privy

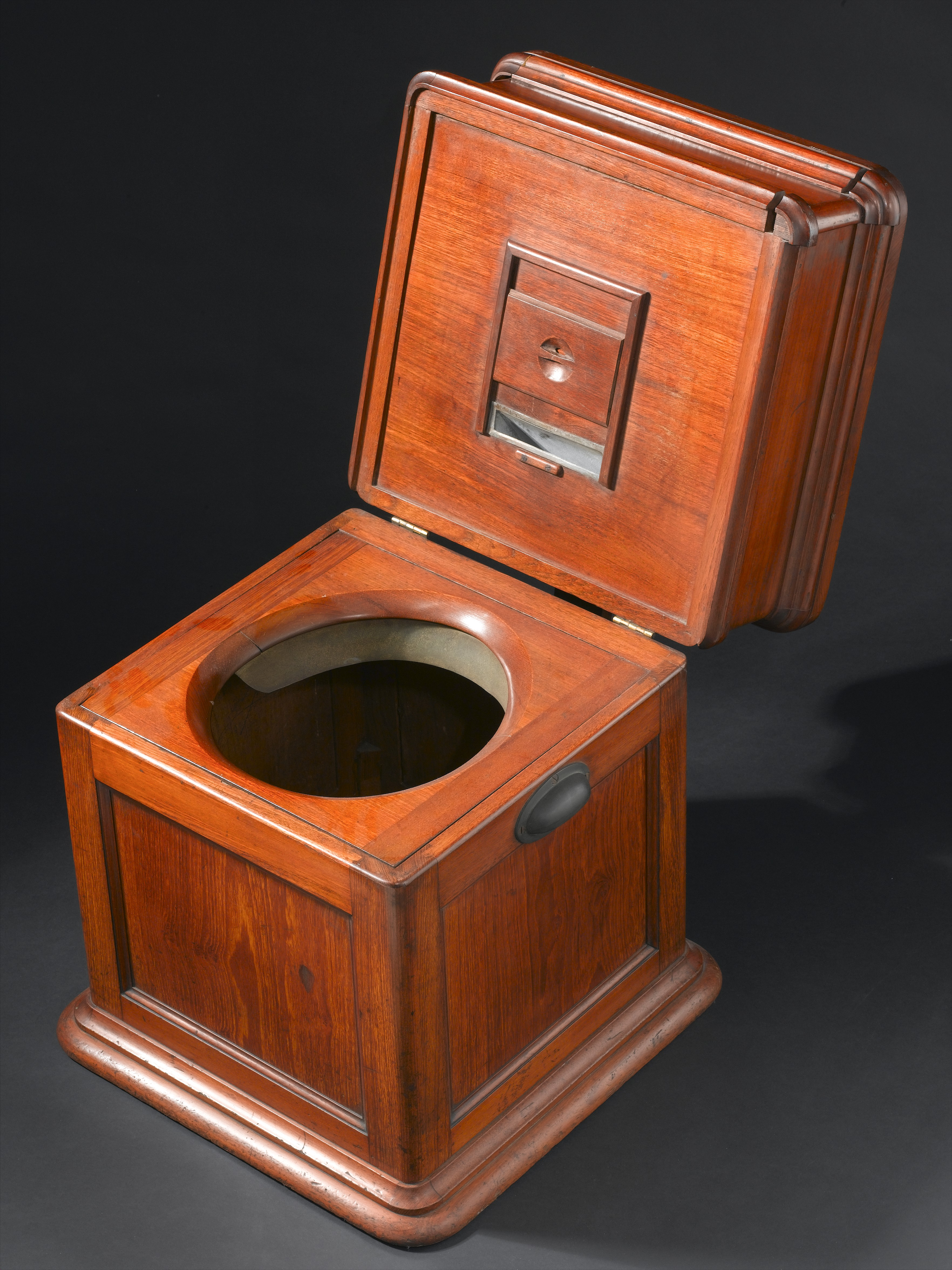
19th century thunderbox, a heavy wooden commode to enclose chamber pot

By the Early Modern era, chamber pots were frequently made of china or copper, and could include elaborate decoration. They were emptied into the gutter of the street nearest to the home.

In pre-modern Denmark, people generally defecated on farmland or other places where the human waste could be collected as fertilizer. The Old Norse language had several terms for referring to outhouses, including garðhús (yard house), náð-/náða-hús (house of rest), and annat hús (the other house). In general, toilets were functionally non-existent in rural Denmark until the 18th century.

By the 16th century, cesspits and cesspools were increasingly dug into the ground near houses in Europe as a means of collecting waste. As urban populations grew and street gutters became blocked with the larger volume of human waste, rain was no longer sufficient to wash away waste from the gutters. A pipe connected the latrine to the cesspool, and sometimes a small amount of water washed waste through. Cesspools were cleaned out by tradesmen, known in English as gong farmers, who pumped out liquid waste, then shovelled out the solid waste and collected it during the night. This solid waste, euphemistically known as nightsoil, was sold as fertilizer for agricultural production (similarly to the closing-the-loop approach of ecological sanitation).

In the early 19th century, public officials and public hygiene experts studied and debated sanitation for several decades. The construction of an underground network of pipes to carry away solid and liquid waste was only begun in the mid 19th-century, gradually replacing the cesspool system, although cesspools were still in use in some parts of Paris into the 20th century. Even London, at that time the world's largest city, did not require indoor toilets in its building codes until after the First World War.

The water closet, with its origins in Tudor times, started to assume its currently known form, with an overhead cistern, s-bends, soil pipes and valves, around 1770. This was the work of Alexander Cumming and Joseph Bramah. Water closets only started to be moved from outside to inside of the home around 1850. The integral water closet started to be built into middle-class homes in the 1860s and 1870s, firstly on the principal bedroom floor and in larger houses in the maids' accommodation, and by 1900 a further one in the hallway. A toilet would also be placed outside the back door of the kitchen for use by gardeners and other outside staff, such as those working with the horses. The speed of introduction was varied, so that in 1906 the predominantly working-class town of Rochdale had 750 water closets for a population of 10,000.

The working-class home had transitioned from the rural cottage, to the urban back-to-back terraces with external rows of privies, to the through terraced houses of the 1880 with their sculleries and individual external WC. It was the Tudor Walters Report of 1918 that recommended that semi-skilled workers should be housed in suburban cottages with kitchens and internal WC. As recommended floor standards changed in the building standards and codes, the bathroom with a water closet and later the low-level suite became more prominent in the home.

Before the introduction of indoor toilets, it was common to use the chamber pot under one's bed at night and then to dispose of its contents in the morning. During the Victorian era, British housemaids collected all of the household's chamber pots and carried them to a room known as the housemaids' cupboard. This room contained a "slop sink", made of wood with a lead lining to prevent chipping china chamber pots, for washing the "bedroom ware" or "chamber utensils". Once running water and flush toilets were plumbed into British houses, servants were sometimes given their own lavatory downstairs, separate from the family lavatory. The practice of emptying one's own chamber pot, known as slopping out, continued in British prisons until as recently as 2014 and was still in use in 85 cells in Ireland in July 2017.

With rare exceptions, chamber pots are no longer used. Similar modern implements include bedpans and commodes, which are used in hospitals and the homes of disabled people.

Long-established sanitary ware manufacturers in the United Kingdom include Adamsez, founded in Newcastle-upon-Tyne in 1880 by M.J. and S.H. Adams, and Twyfords, founded in Hanley, Stoke-on-Trent in 1849 by Thomas Twyford and his son Thomas William Twyford.

==== Development of dry earth closets ====
Henry Moule's earth closet design, c. 1909

Before the widespread adoption of the flush toilet, there were inventors, scientists, and public health officials who supported the use of "dry earth closets" – nowadays known either as dry toilets or composting toilets.

==== Development of flush toilets ====
Although a precursor to the flush toilet system which is widely used nowadays was designed in 1596 by John Harington, such systems did not come into widespread use until the late nineteenth century. With the onset of the Industrial Revolution and related advances in technology, the flush toilet began to emerge into its modern form. A crucial advance in plumbing was the S-trap, invented by the Scottish mechanic Alexander Cummings in 1775, and still in use today. This device uses the standing water to seal the outlet of the bowl, preventing the escape of foul air from the sewer. It was only in the mid-19th century, with growing levels of urbanisation and industrial prosperity, that the flush toilet became a widely used and marketed invention. This period coincided with the dramatic growth in the sewage system, especially in London, which made the flush toilet particularly attractive for health and sanitation reasons.

Flush toilets were also known as "water closets", as opposed to the earth closets described above. Water closets first appeared in Britain in the 1880s, and soon spread to Continental Europe. In America, the chain-pull indoor toilet was introduced in the homes of the wealthy and in hotels in the 1890s. William Elvis Sloan invented the Flushometer in 1906, which used pressurized water directly from the supply line for faster recycle time between flushes.

==== High-tech toilets ====
"High-tech" toilets, which can be found in countries like Japan, may include features such as automatic flushing mechanisms; water jets, blow dryers, or artificial flush sounds to mask noises. Others can include medical monitoring features such as urine and stool analysis and the checking of blood pressure, temperature, and blood sugar. Some toilets have automatic lid operation, heated seats, deodorizing fans, or automated replacement of paper toilet-seat-covers. Interactive urinals have been developed in several countries, allowing users to play video games. The "Toylet", produced by Sega, uses pressure sensors to detect the flow of urine and translates that into on-screen action.

Astronauts on the International Space Station use a space toilet with urine diversion, which can recover potable water.

== Names ==
=== Etymology ===
In La Toilette from Hogarth's Marriage à la Mode series (1743), a young countess receives her lover, tradesmen, hangers-on, and an Italian tenor as she finishes her toilette

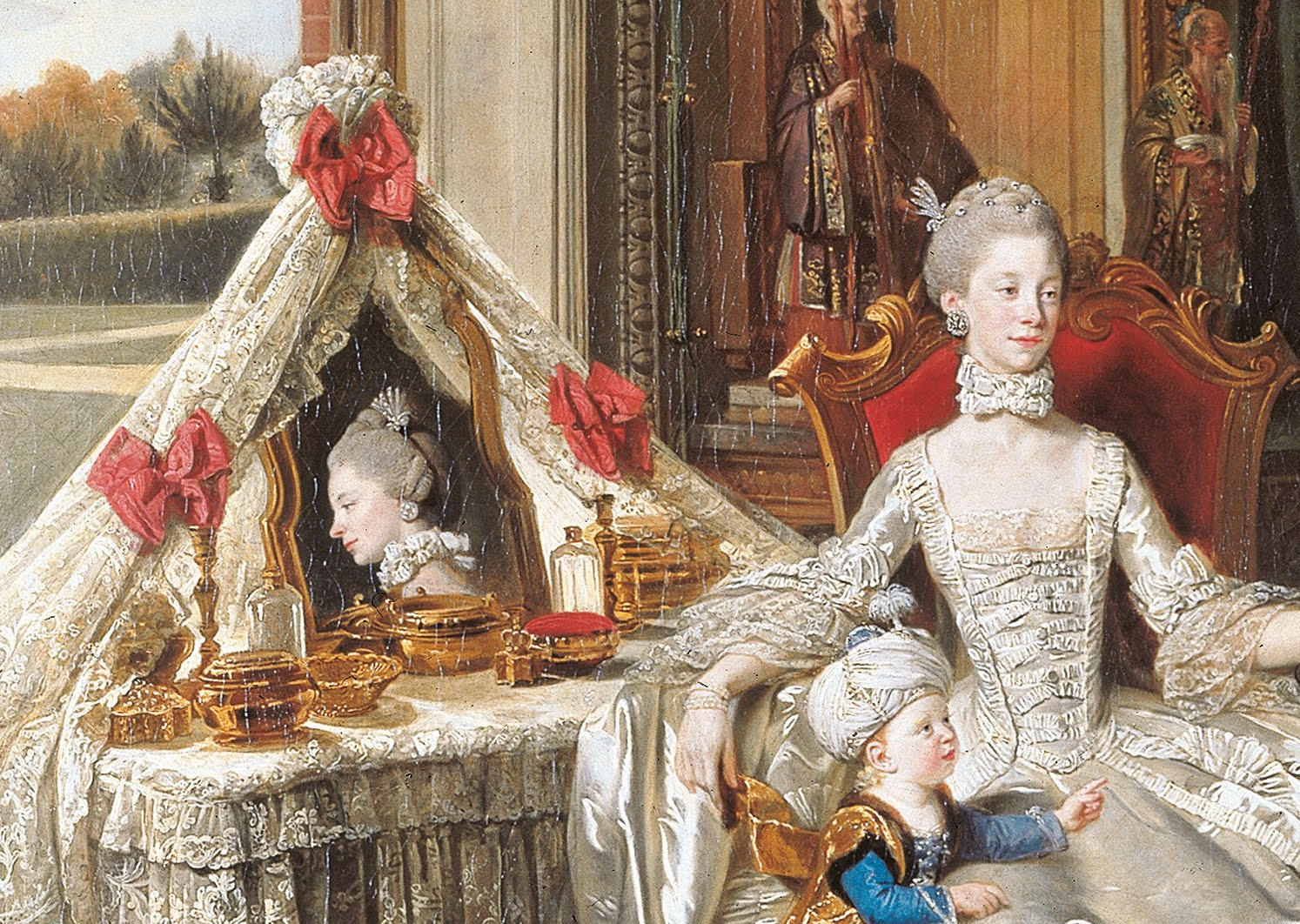
Detail of Queen Charlotte with her Two Eldest Sons, Johan Zoffany, 1765, (the whole painting). She is doing her toilet, with her silver-gilt toilet service on the dressing-table

Toilet was originally a French loanword (first attested in 1540) that referred to the toilette ("little cloth") draped over one's shoulders during hairdressing. During the late 17th century, the term came to be used by metonymy in both languages for the whole complex of grooming and body care that centered at a dressing table (also covered by a cloth) and for the equipment composing a toilet service, including a mirror, hairbrushes, and containers for powder and makeup. The time spent at such a table also came to be known as one's "toilet"; it came to be a period during which close friends or tradesmen were received as "toilet-calls". (Note: See, e.g., the description of the Hogarth painting "The Toilette" from his Marriage à-la-mode series in Egerton or the extensive discussion of a lady's toilet in Pope.)

The use of "toilet" to describe a special room for grooming came much later (first attested in 1819), following the French cabinet de toilet. Similar to "powder room", "toilet" then came to be used as a euphemism for rooms dedicated to urination and defecation, particularly in the context of signs for public toilets, as on trains. Finally, it came to be used for the plumbing fixtures in such rooms (apparently first in the United States) as these replaced chamber pots, outhouses, and latrines. These two uses, the fixture and the room, completely supplanted the other senses of the word during the 20th century except in the form "toiletries". (Note: The French eau de toilette ("toilet water") is sometimes used as a sophisticated synonym for perfume and cologne but is generally received jokingly, as with Cosmopolitan's parody "If it doesn't say 'eau de toilette' on the label, it most likely doesn't come from the famed region of Eau de Toilette in France and might not even come from toilets at all.")

=== Contemporary use ===
The word "toilet" was by etymology a euphemism, but is no longer understood as such. As old euphemisms have become the standard term, they have been progressively replaced by newer ones, an example of the euphemism treadmill at work. The choice of word relies not only on regional variation, but also on social situation and level of formality (register) or social class. American manufacturers show an uneasiness with the word and its class attributes: American Standard, the largest firm, sells them as "toilets", yet the higher-priced products of the Kohler Company, often installed in more expensive housing, are sold as commodes or closets, words which also carry other meanings. Confusingly, products imported from Japan such as TOTO are referred to as "toilets", even though they carry the cachet of higher cost and quality. Toto (an abbreviation of Tōyō Tōki, 東洋陶器, Oriental Ceramics) is used in Japanese comics to visually indicate toilets or other things that look like toilets (see Toilets in Japan).

=== Regional variants ===
Different dialects use "bathroom" and "restroom" (American English), "bathroom" and "washroom" (Canadian English), and "WC" (an initialism for "water closet"), "lavatory" and its abbreviation "lav" (British English). Euphemisms for the toilet that bear no direct reference to the activities of urination and defecation are ubiquitous in modern Western languages, reflecting a general attitude of unspeakability about such bodily function. These euphemistic practices appear to have become pronounced following the emergence of European colonial practices, which frequently denigrated colonial subjects in Africa, Asia and South America as 'unclean'.

=== Euphemisms ===
"Crapper" was already in use as a coarse name for a toilet, but it gained currency from the work of Thomas Crapper, who popularized flush toilets in England and held several patents on toilet improvements.

"The Jacks" is Irish slang for toilet. It perhaps derives from "jacques" and "jakes", an old English term.

"Loo" – The etymology of loo is obscure. The Oxford English Dictionary notes the 1922 appearance of "How much cost? Waterloo. Watercloset." in James Joyce's novel Ulysses and defers to Alan S. C. Ross's arguments that it derived in some fashion from the site of Napoleon's 1815 defeat. In the 1950s the use of the word "loo" was considered one of the markers of British upper-class speech, featuring in a famous essay, "U and non-U English". "Loo" may have derived from a corruption of French l'eau ("water"), gare à l'eau – whence Scots gardy loo – ("mind the water", used in reference to emptying chamber pots into the street from an upper-story window), lieu ("place"), lieu d'aisance ("place of ease", used euphemistically for a toilet), or lieu à l'anglaise ("English place", used from around 1770 to refer to English-style toilets installed for travelers). Other proposed etymologies include a supposed tendency to place toilets in room 100 (hence "loo") in English hotels, a sailors' dialectal corruption of the nautical term "lee" in reference to the shipboard need to urinate and defecate with the wind prior to the advent of head pumps, (Note: Yachtsmen still tend to refer to their toilets as "loos" rather than "heads".) or the 17th-century preacher Louis Bourdaloue, whose long sermons at Paris's Saint-Paul-Saint-Louis prompted his parishioners to bring along chamber pots, and his surname was applied to the pots themselves. "The Throne" is another common slang term due to the toilet's resemblance to a king's throne and the similarities between royal battle and using the restroom.

== Gallery ==
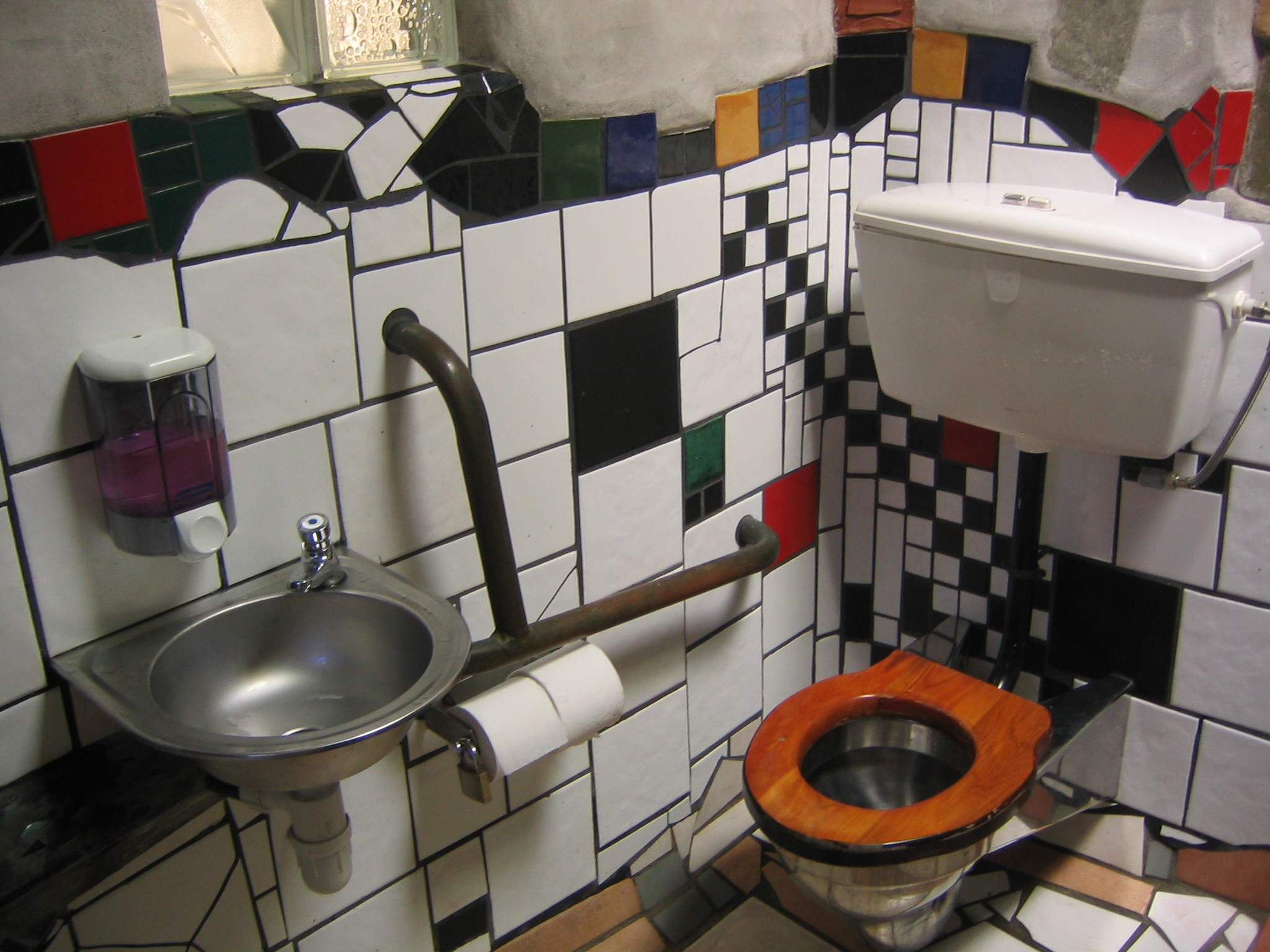
Men's toilet designed by artist and architect Hundertwasser

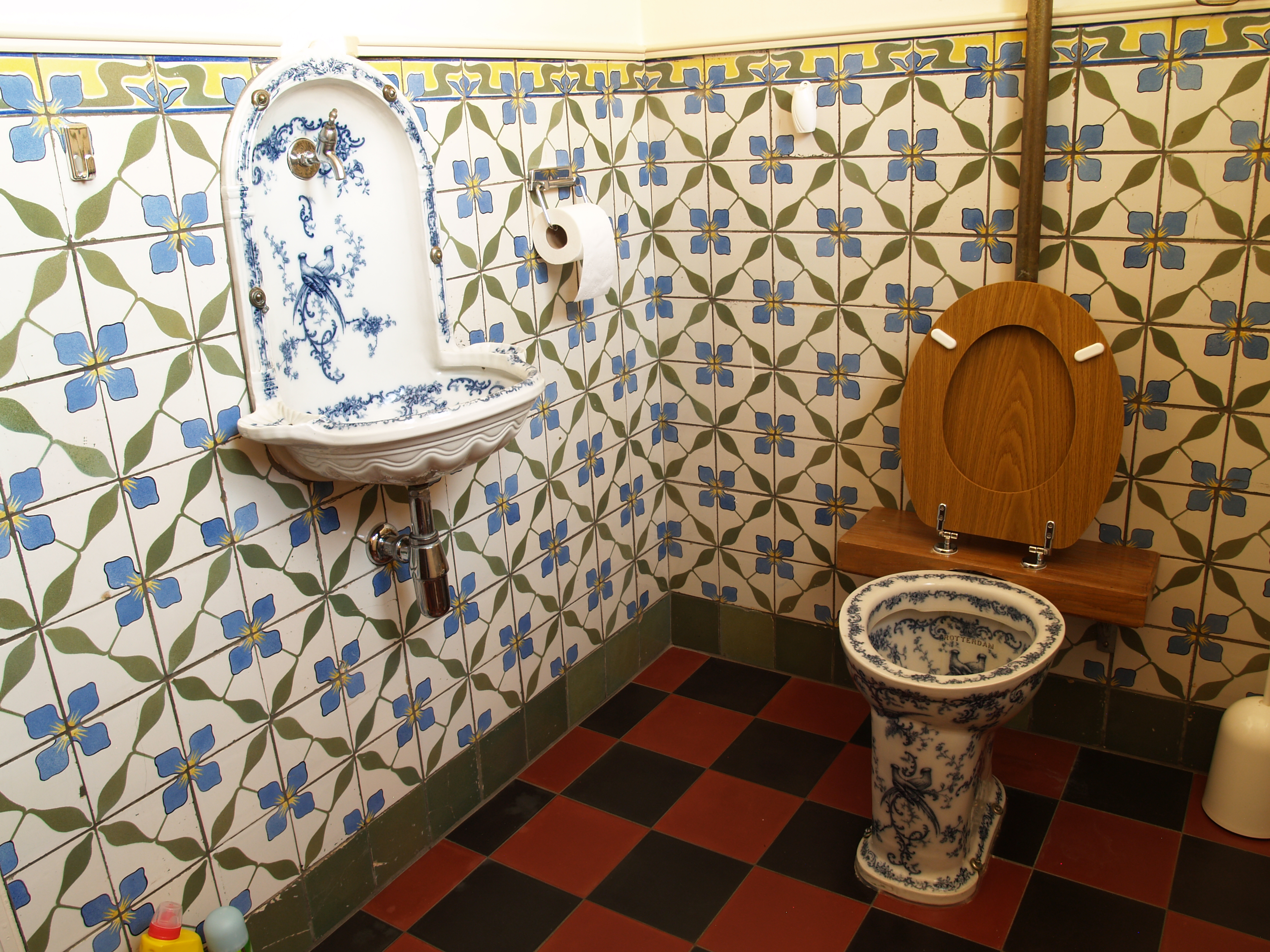
Toilet in Delftware style

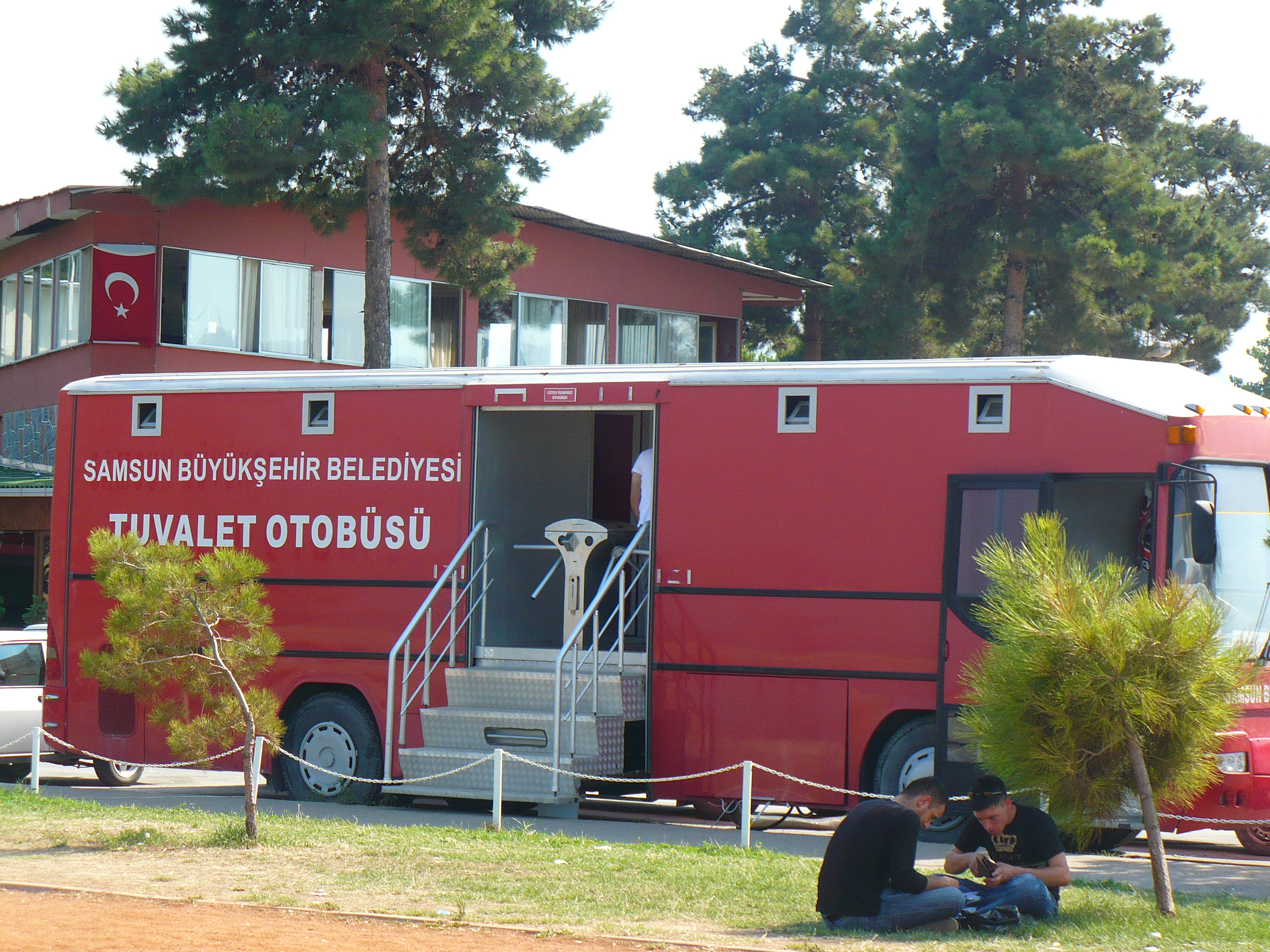
Toilet bus in Samsun, Turkey

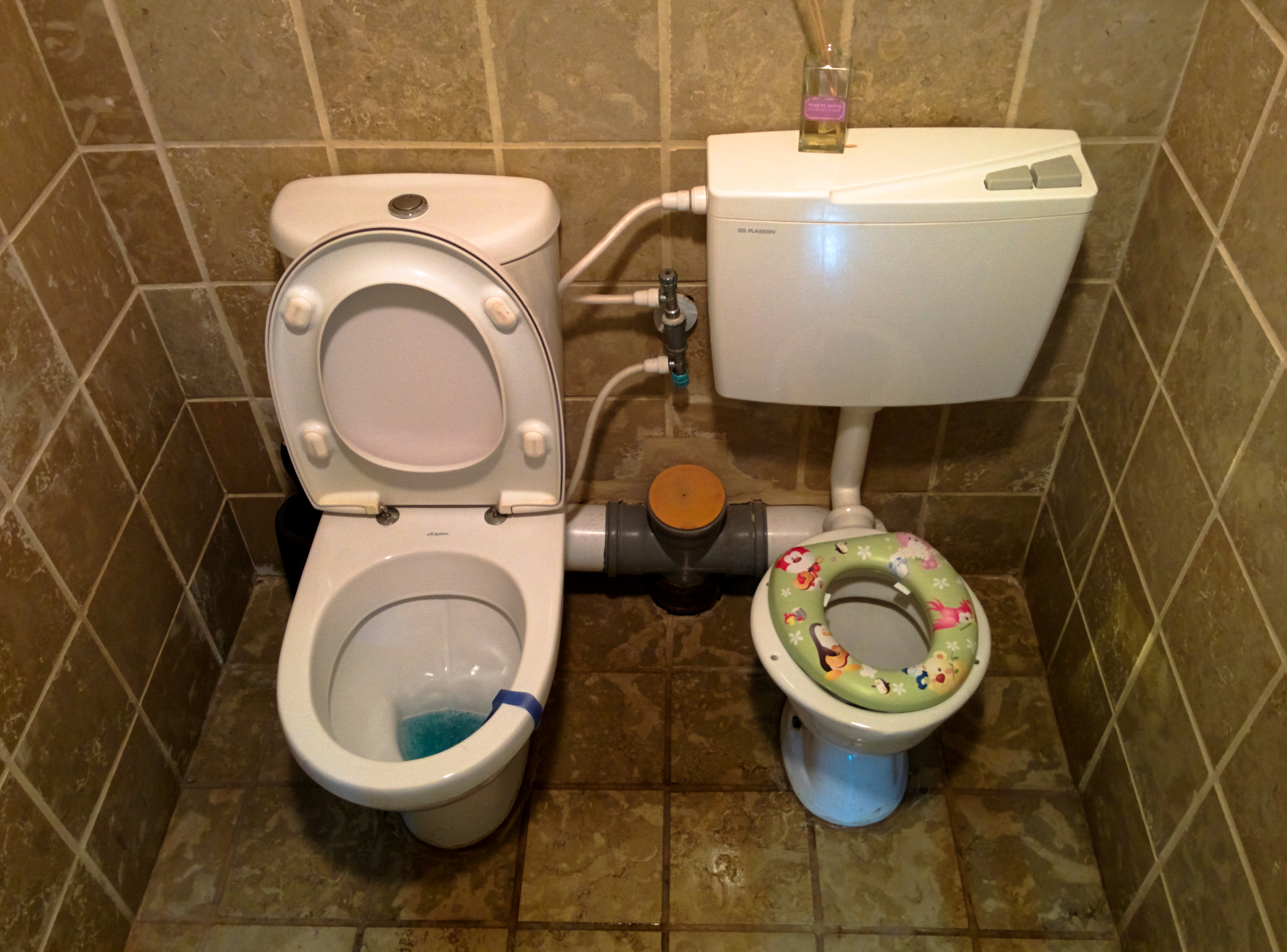
Duo toilet for child training in a banquet hall near Jerusalem

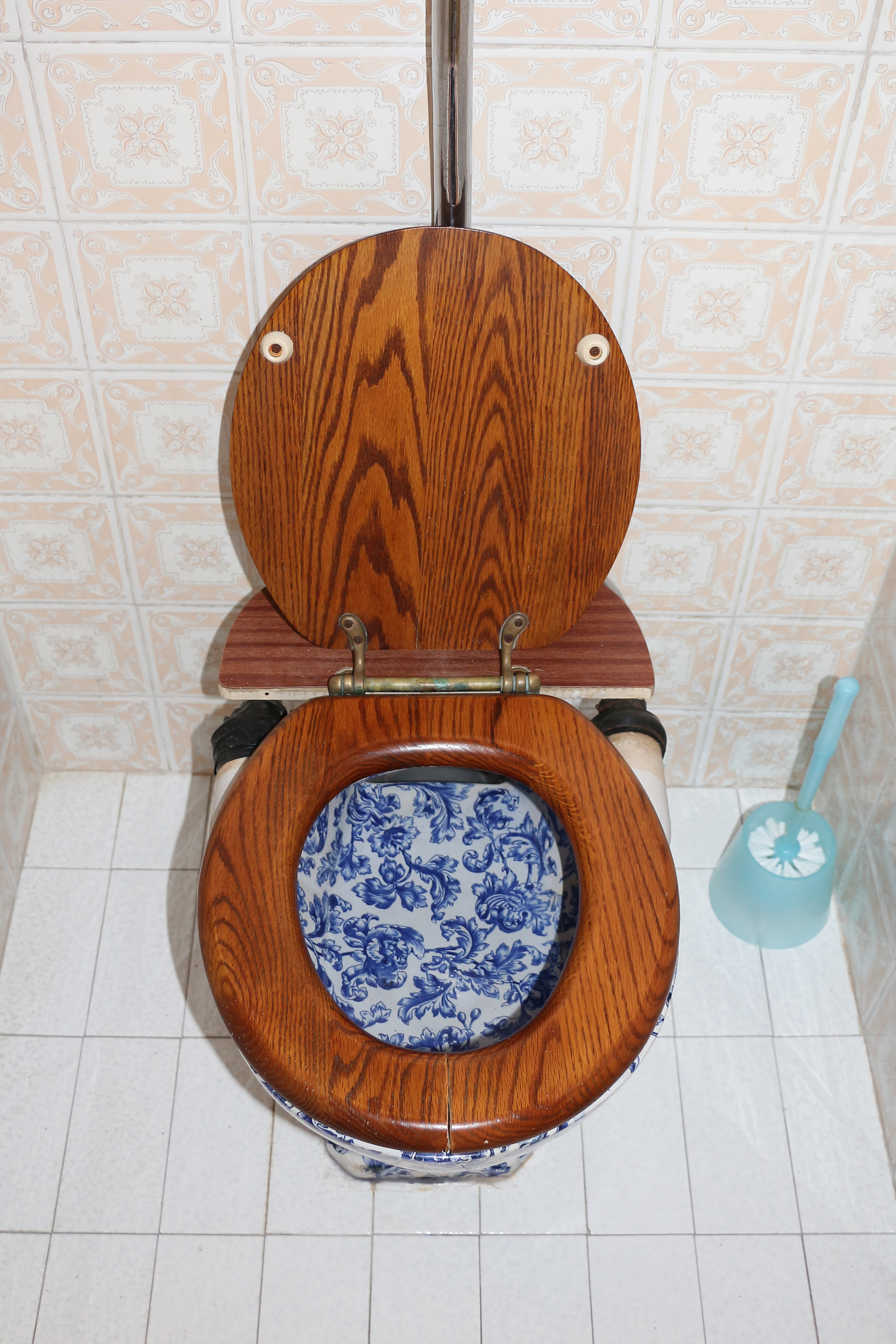
Toilet in Croatian National Theatre in Zagreb, Croatia

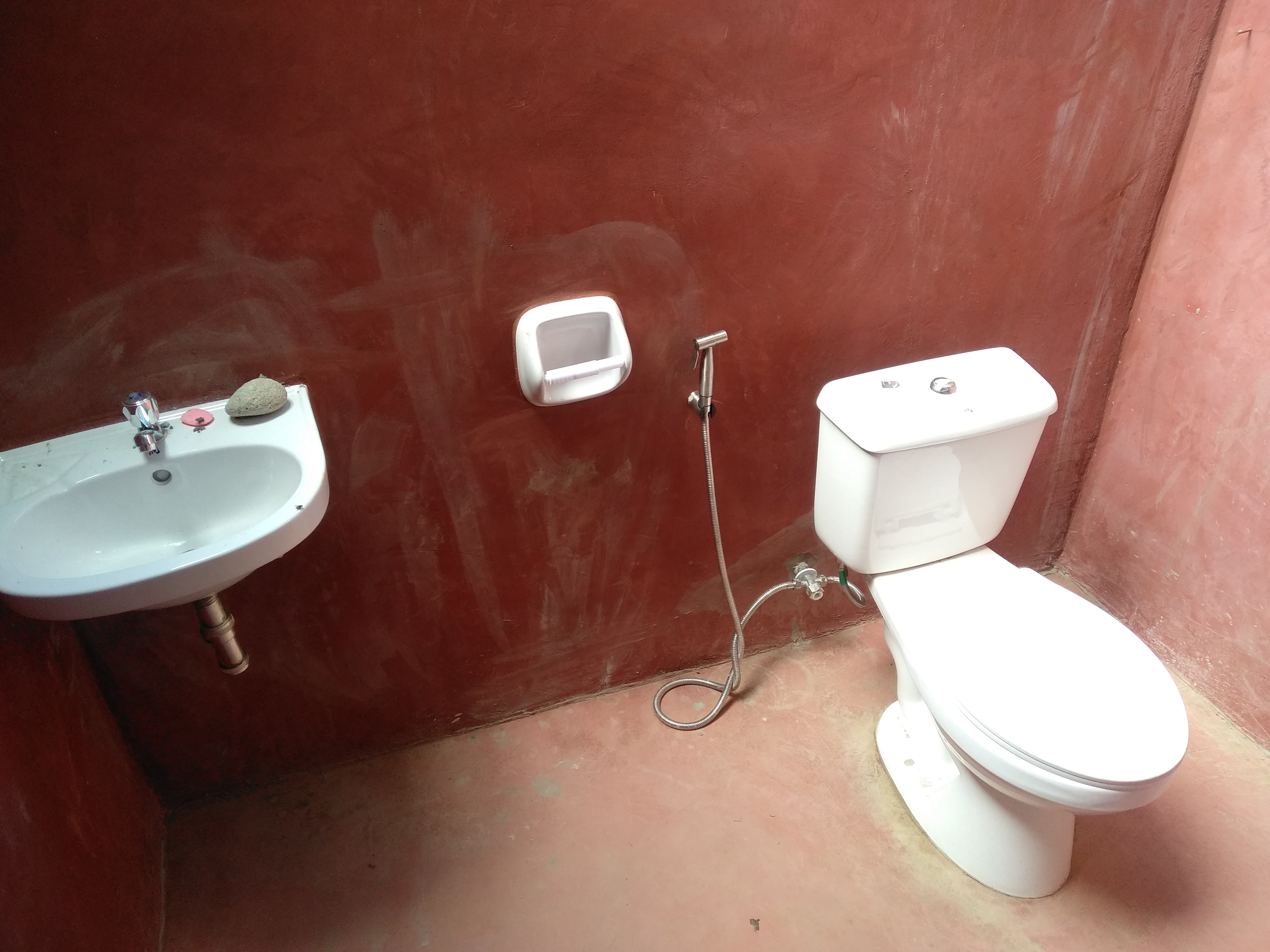
A public toilet in Antipolo, Philippines

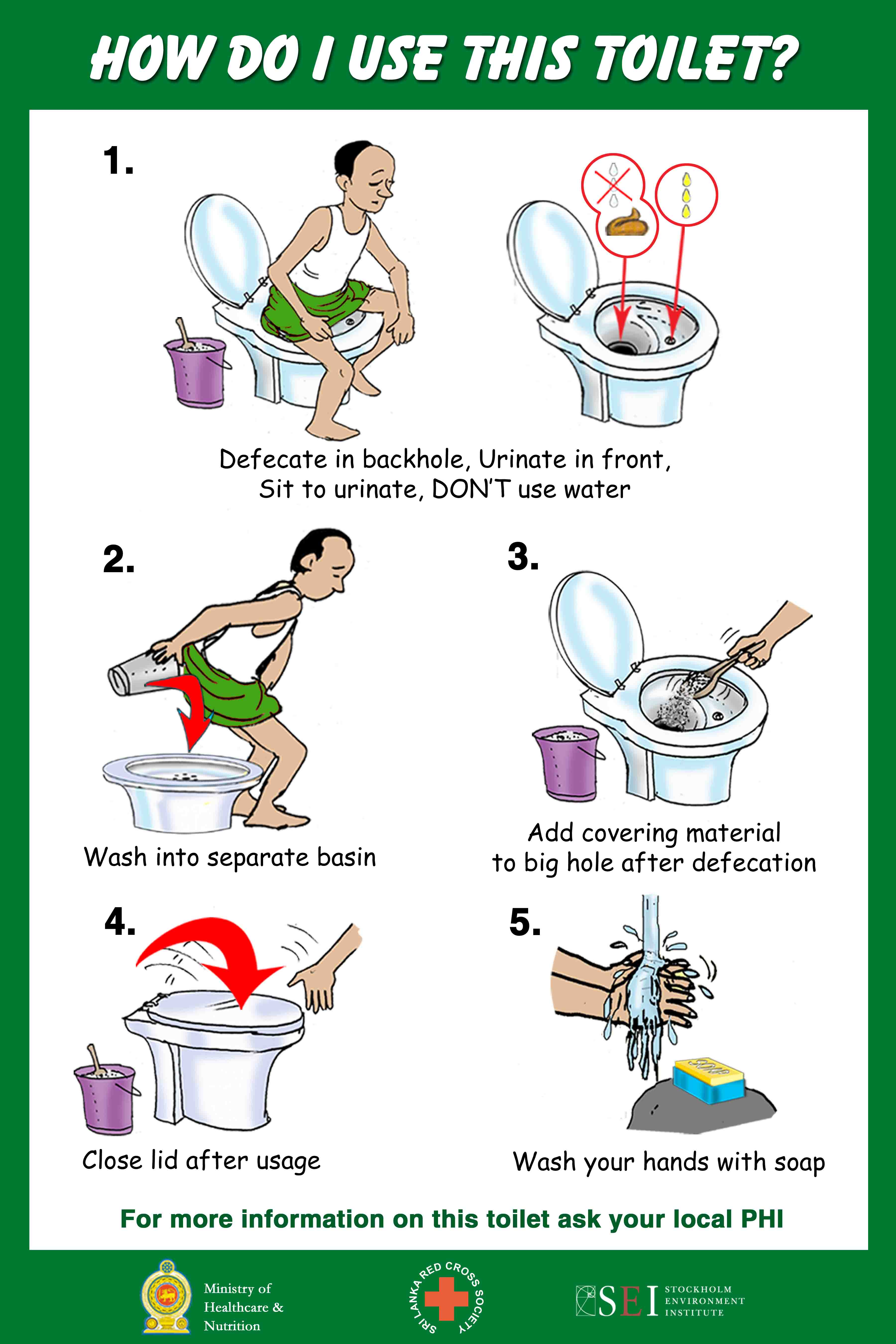
Instructions on using a urine-diverting dry toilet in Sri Lanka

== See also ==
- Community toilet scheme
- Electronic toilet
- Green train corridor
- Human right to water and sanitation
- Improved sanitation
- Pay toilet
- Sanisette
- Sulabh International Museum of Toilets
- Sustainable Sanitation Alliance
- Swachh Bharat Mission
- Toilet humour
- Toilet-related injuries and deaths
- Vermifilter toilet
- Waste management
- World Toilet Day
- World Toilet Organization – organization which focuses on toilets and sanitation at the global level
- Workers' right to access the toilet
