= Sloan Valve Company =

Manufacturer of plumbing systems

- Type: Private
- Founded: 1906; 120 years ago
- Headquarters: Franklin Park, Illinois, US
- Key people: William E. Sloan, Founder Charles S. Allen, Chairman; Kirk Allen, Co-President; James Allen, Co-President Graham Allen, Co-President
- Products: Faucets, flushometers, vitreous china fixtures, sink systems, hand hygiene, programmed water technology, parts and accessories
- Number of employees: 1,000
- Website: sloan.com

Sloan Valve Company is a privately held American company specializing in plumbing valves and fixtures. The company is still managed by descendants of William Sloan.

== History ==
The company was founded by William Elvis Sloan in Chicago, Illinois in 1906 with the introduction of the Royal flushometer, a valve to release a measured amount of water to flush a urinal or toilet. Initial sales were very poor: only a single Royal model flushometer was sold in 1906, and two in 1907. Sales improved dramatically in 1908, to 150 units. Initially, potential customers were wary of adjusting to his invention. Even some plumbing fixture manufacturers wouldn't sell their products if they were furnished with Sloan's flushometers. However, the original 1906 design has proven so reliable that as of 2012, parts are still available to repair any flushometer ever made.

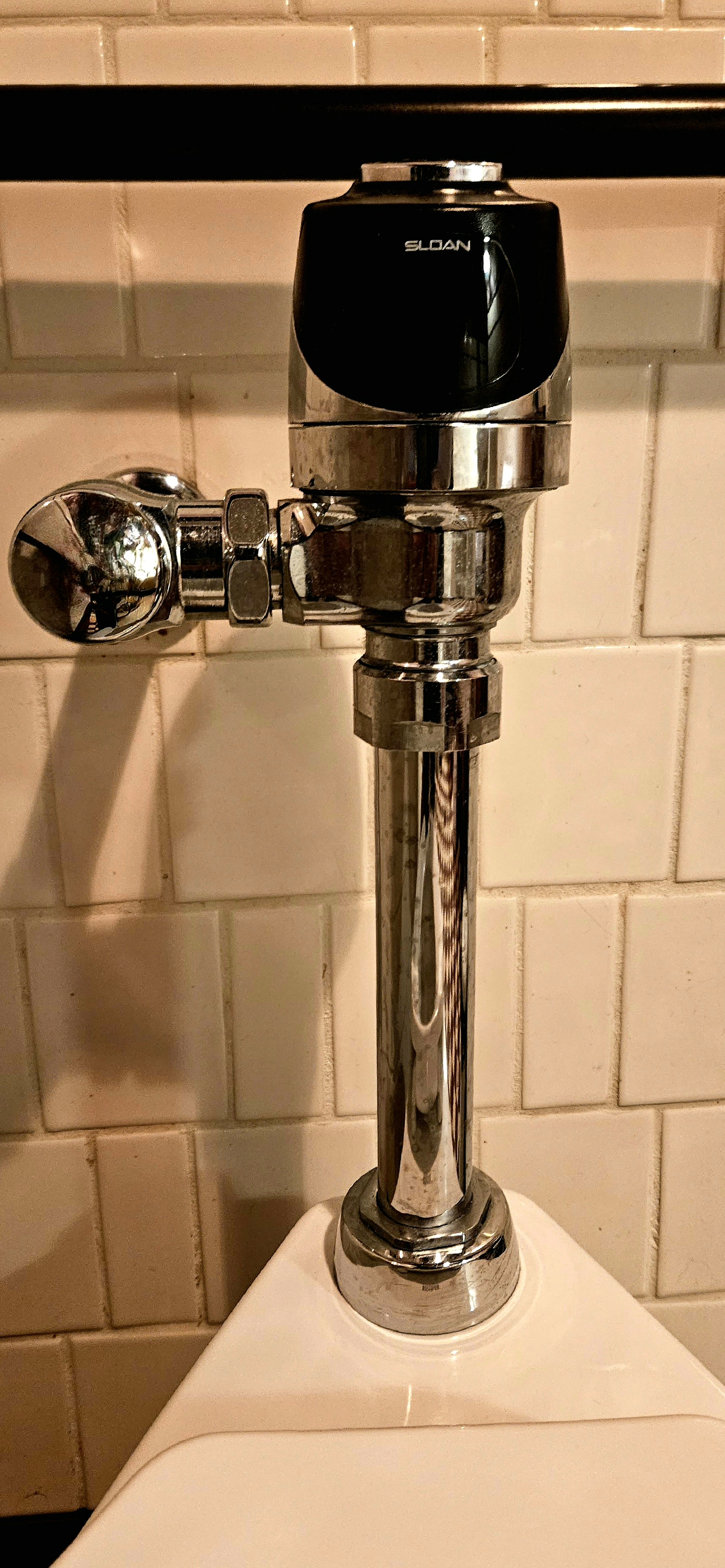
Contemporary (2023) Sloan motion sensor flushometer

In addition to its flush valves based on diaphragm technology, Sloan also introduced piston-type flushometers, including the Crown and the GEM 2. A special piston-type flushometer, called the Naval, was built for marine applications. In 1976, Sloan introduced the Optima line of sensor-activated flushometers (the first few were installed at Chicago's O'Hare International Airport); battery-powered equivalents under the name Optima Plus followed in 1991. Sloan also now has solar-powered models with a battery back-up that operate using any artificial or natural light source.

In the mid 1980s Sloan acquired Water Control International (WCI) who had developed Flushmate, which brought commercial pressure-assist technology to the residential market by use of an airtight plastic vessel placed in the tank that leverages supply line water to compress air. Passage of the Energy Policy Act of 1992 mandated a maximum of 1.6 gallons per flush (gpf), which provided the use-case for Flushmate to expand as a product line.

== Water-saving initiatives ==
Sloan has made a major commitment to producing equipment that minimizes consumption of water. This effort is led by co-presidents Jim Allen, Kirk Allen and Graham Allen.

The company is producing the dual-flush Uppercut flushometer with a green handle. Pressing the lever down produces a regular 1.6-gallon flush, while lifting the lever up produces a 1.1 gallon flush.

Sloan also introduced waterfree urinals that use a special trap with a lightweight, biodegradable oil that allows the urine to pass through but prevents odors from escaping.

The company also offers sensor-activated flushometers and other plumbing fixtures, including water-efficient electronic faucets, solid-surface lavatory systems, stainless-steel scrub sinks and wash stations, and bedpan washer flushometers. Other restroom fixtures include sensor-activated hand dryers, low-flow showerheads, networked water-control systems, and electronic soap dispensers.

Sloan is currently integrating its products as internet of things devices with a cloud-based data analytics software, SC Argus Pro, to monitor water usage and condition in large facilities.

== Recalls and settlement on exploding toilets ==
2.3 million pressure assisted flush components produced by Sloan through its Flushmate division between September 1996 to December 2015 and integrated into numerous toilets was the subject of extensive recalls that led to 304 explosion reports and 14 injuries. This was settled for $18 million in 2014.

== Sponsorship ==
In January 2015, Sloan announced a new marketing and sponsor partnership with the Chicago Cubs and Wrigley Field which included naming rights to the Cubs spring training facility in Mesa, Arizona. Formerly named Cubs Park, the stadium is now called Sloan Park.
