= Flushometer =

Plumbing mechanism

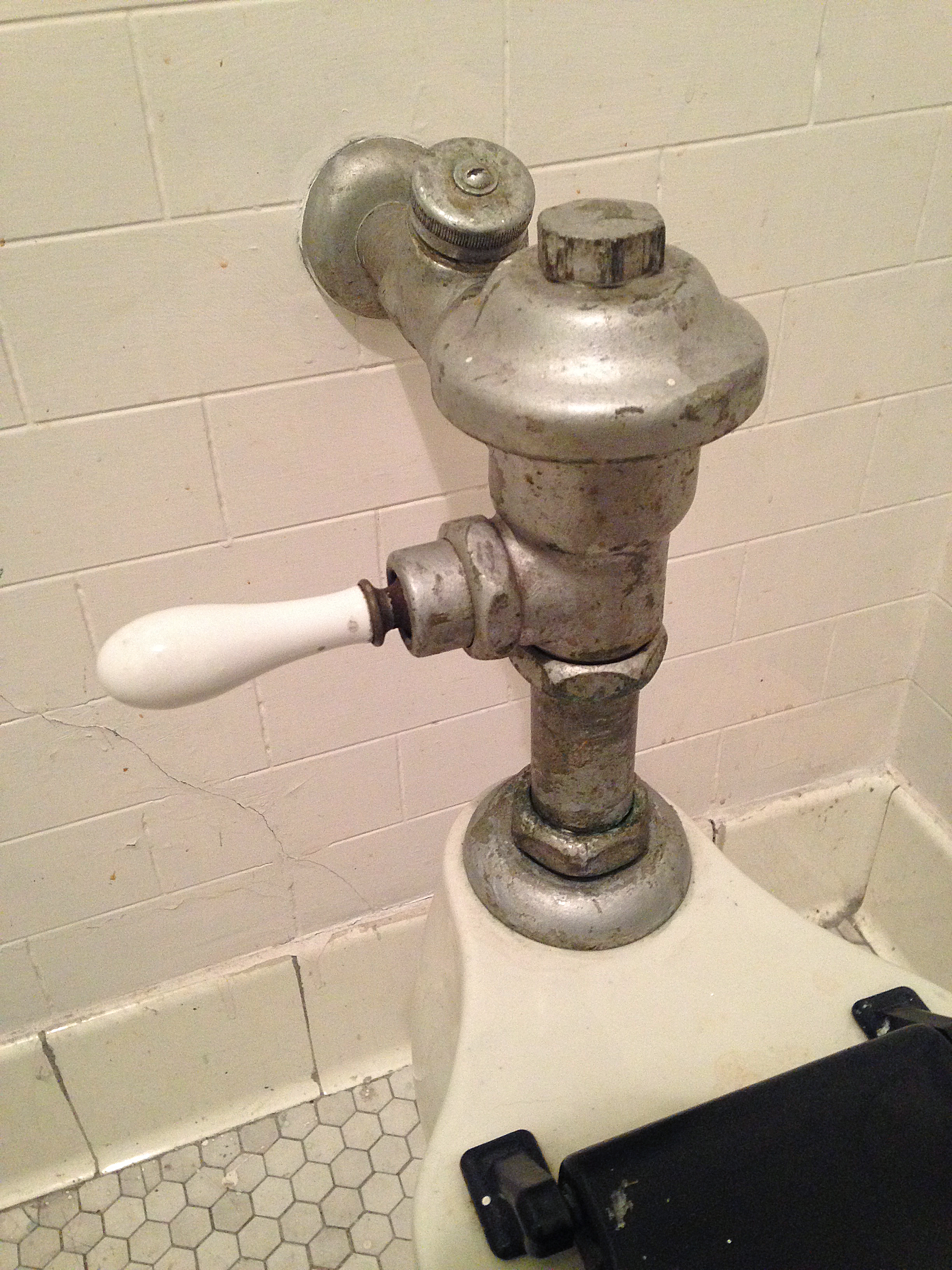
A flushometer from the mid-20th century with a porcelain handle

A flushometer is a metal water-diverter that uses an inline handle to flush tankless toilets or urinals. It was invented by William Elvis Sloan and is a product of the Sloan Valve Company.

== Function ==
It uses water pressure from the water supply system rather than gravity from a raised tank like in previous models. A diaphragm separates a pressure chamber from the main water supply. A narrow passageway leads from the main water supply into the pressure chamber. It is the narrowness of this passage that meters the flow by slowing repressurizing of the pressure chamber after the action of a flush. The diaphragm technology allows the flush valve to open and let water into the bowl. A main cylinder valve operates up and down. A groove in this cylinder allows water from the main supply to flow through when it is in a mid position. The valve is shut off at both its top and bottom positions. A second valve, placed within the main cylinder valve, releases the water in the topmost pressure chamber when the flush lever is activated, sending the main cylinder valve shooting upwards. The topmost pressure chamber slowly refills through its narrow passageway, pushing the valve cylinder back down gradually. A flush occurs while it is in its open mid positions. Because the water is gradually shut off, slower water at the end of the cycle that will not activate the siphon serves to refill the bowl. The valve cannot be kept open by holding the flush lever in the activated position, wasting water, because this only sends the main cylinder valve all the way up to its topmost shut off position. A flush can only occur when the valve is in one of its mid positions.

== Advantages and disadvantages ==
A flushometer is usually installed in larger commercial settings as it provides a high-pressure and better-performing wash and flush than a normal gravity toilet. However, a flushometer requires that the building have a larger supply line than is normally found in small to medium residential buildings, and therefore such buildings typically use tank-type toilets.

According to a study done on toilet plumes, this type of toilet produces far more droplets than other types; both in total droplets and droplets per litre flushed.
