= William Elvis Sloan =

American inventor

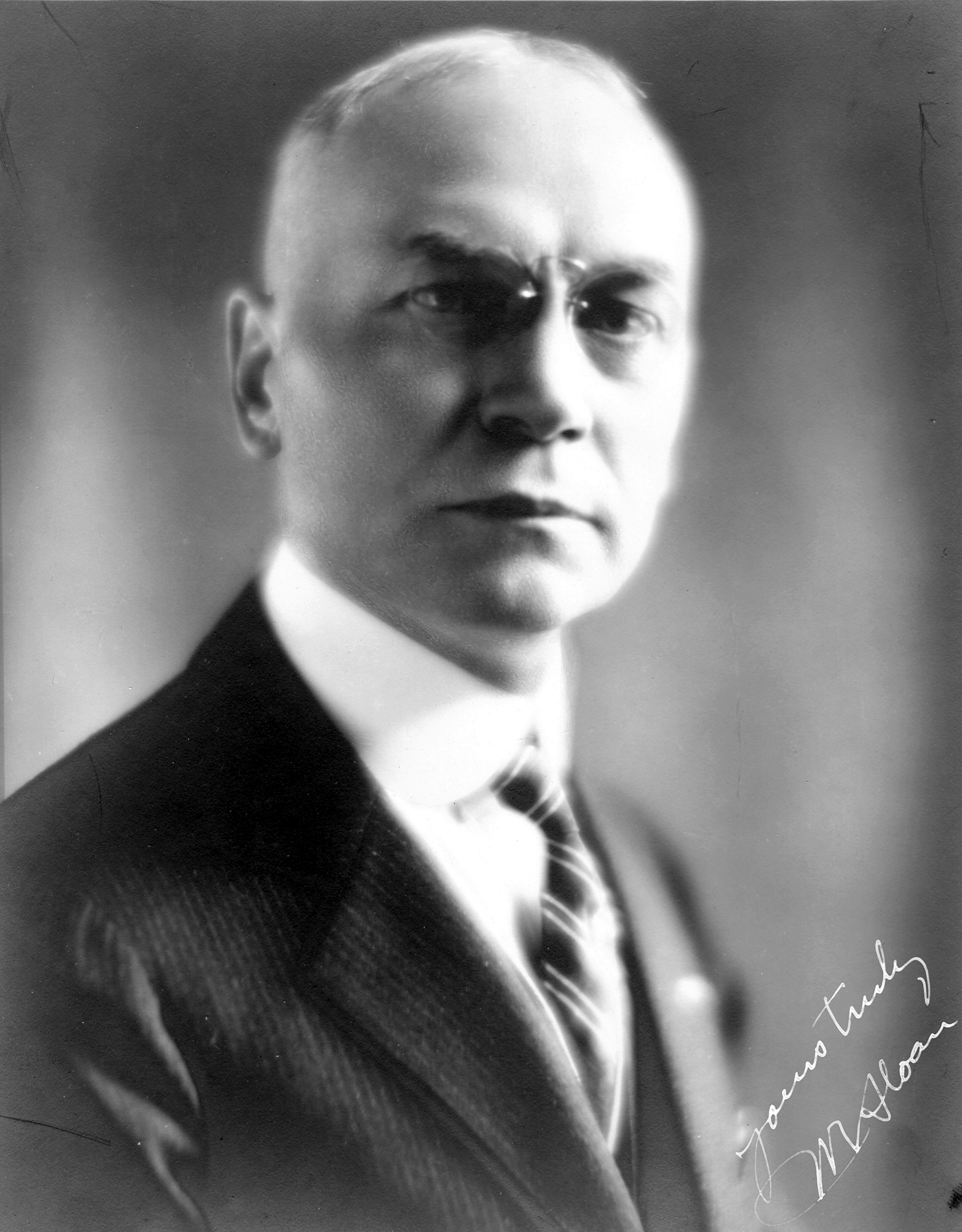

William Elvis Sloan I (October 1867 – June 25, 1961) invented the Flushometer flushing mechanism for toilets and urinals. It is installed in millions of commercial, institutional and industrial restrooms worldwide.

== Biography ==
He was born in Liberty, Missouri, in October 1867. He was an apprentice pipe fitter in Missouri then moved to Chicago, Illinois. He married Bertha Moore (1874-?) in 1898 in Chicago, Illinois, and they had a child, Edith Marie Sloan (1913-?).

In 1906, he founded Sloan Valve Company, which is now headquartered in Franklin Park, Illinois.

He died on June 25, 1961, at the age of 93 in Chicago, Illinois, and was buried in Oak Park, Illinois.

== Legacy ==
With the exception of a period of time in the 1940s and early 1950s, Sloan Valve has been under the leadership of W.E. Sloan’s descendants. He had a grandson, William Elvis Sloan II (1941–2001).
