= Community toilet scheme =

UK local council initiatives

A community toilet scheme or courtesy toilet scheme is a type of initiative originating in the UK, whereby local councils seek to increase the provision of public toilets by encouraging private businesses (typically food and retail outlets) to make their toilets available to members of the public. This is usually presented as an opportunity for a business to increase its footfall, or in return for an annual payment that covers their costs. In 2008, the schemes were promoted by the UK government in the guide Improving Public Access to Better Quality Toilets, highlighting the UK's first such scheme created by the London Borough of Richmond upon Thames. Commenting on the success of the scheme in Richmond upon Thames, the director of the British Toilet Association remarked that such schemes were but "one important tool in the public toilet armoury".

The schemes are usually set up as a mitigation for the closure of public toilets, which reduced in number by 39 percent in the two decades to 2018. However, some campaigners claim they do not provide an adequate substitute in either quantity or fair distribution. During the COVID-19 pandemic, many participating businesses closed down; consequently in Bristol the scheme was temporarily suspended and public toilets reopened. In Edinburgh, venues which had previously been part of the local scheme closed their toilets during the pandemic, but have not reopened them since the lifting of restrictions, citing staff shortages.

Community toilet schemes have been launched in cities across the UK (including Belfast, Derry City and Strabane, St Albans and many others), Australia, and Germany, and have been proposed in the United States.
