= WECF =

WECF may refer to:

- Women Engage for a Common Future, formerly named Women Engage for a Common Future
- World Evangelical Congregational Fellowship, a global association of evangelical Christian Congregational Churches

== See also ==
- WCF (disambiguation)
