= Urine-diverting dry toilet =

Dry toilet with separate collection of feces and urine without any flush water

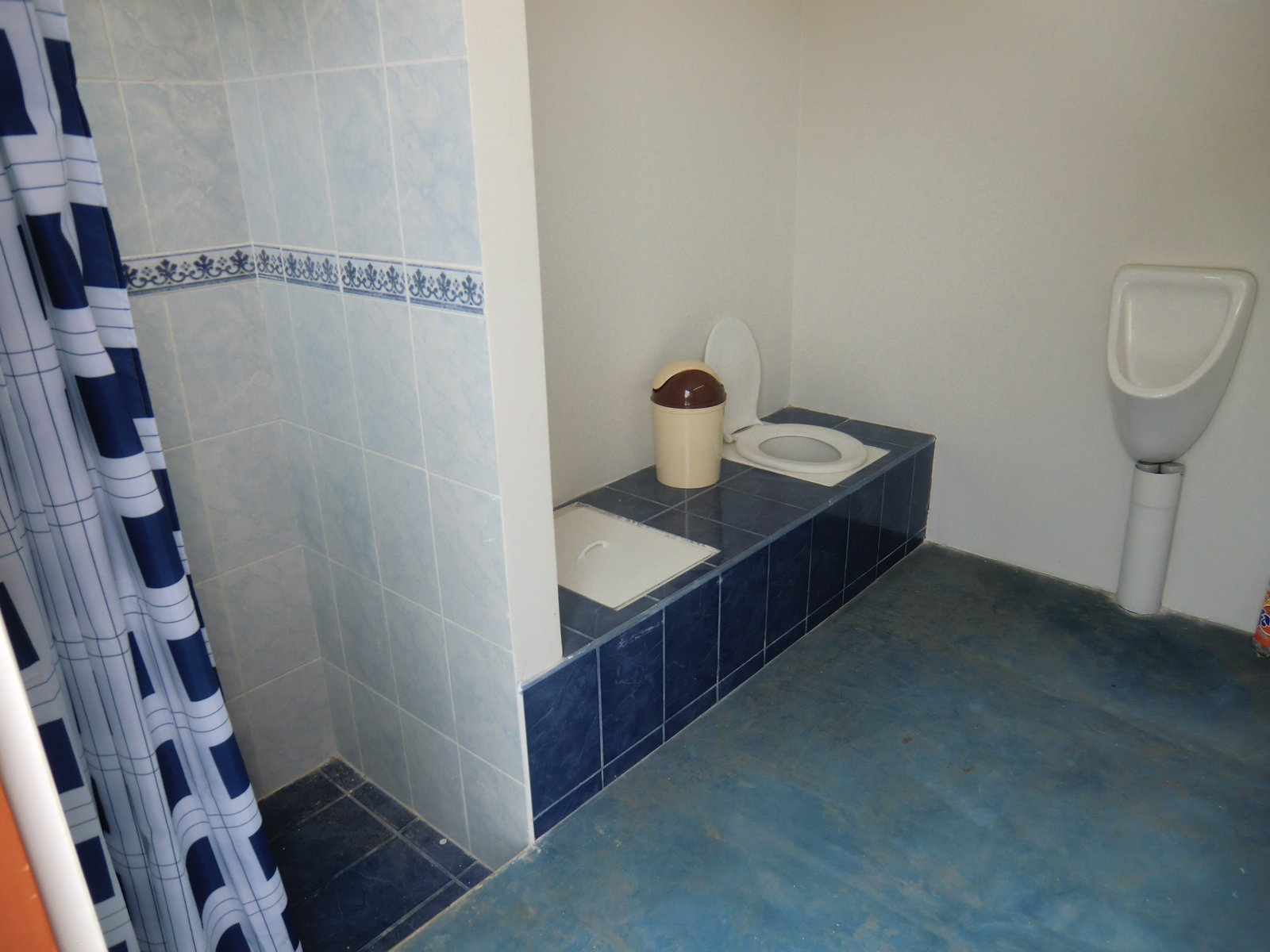
- Double-vault UDDT, waterless urinal and shower integrated into a household's bathroom in a non-sewered area of Lima, Peru
- Position in sanitation chain: User interface, collection and storage/treatment (on-site)
- Application level: Household or neighborhood level (schools)
- Management level: Household, public, shared (most common is household level)
- Inputs: Urine, feces, anal washwater
- Outputs: Dried feces, urine
- Types: Single chamber or twin chamber; removable containers or not; 2-hole or 3-hole for anal hygiene
- Environmental concerns: None

A urine-diverting dry toilet (UDDT) is a type of dry toilet with urine diversion that can be used to provide safe, affordable sanitation in a variety of contexts worldwide. The separate collection of feces and urine without any flush water has many advantages, such as odor-free operation and pathogen reduction by drying. While dried feces and urine harvested from UDDTs can be and routinely are used in agriculture (respectively, as a soil amendment and nutrient-rich fertilizer—this practice being known as reuse of excreta in agriculture), many UDDT installations do not apply any sort of recovery scheme. The UDDT is an example of a technology that can be used to achieve a sustainable sanitation system. This dry excreta management system (or "dry sanitation" system) is an alternative to pit latrines and flush toilets, especially where water is scarce, a connection to a sewer system and centralized wastewater treatment plant is not feasible or desired, fertilizer and soil conditioner are needed for agriculture, or groundwater pollution should be minimized.

There are several types of UDDTs: the single vault type which has only one feces vault; the double vault type which has two feces vaults that are used alternately; and the mobile or portable UDDTs, which are a variation of the single vault type and are commercially manufactured or homemade from simple materials. A UDDT can be configured as a sitting toilet (with a urine diversion pedestal or bench) or as a squatting toilet (with a urine diversion squatting pan). The most important design elements of the UDDT are: source separation of urine and feces; waterless operation; and ventilated vaults (also called "chambers") or removable containers for feces storage and treatment. If anal cleansing takes place with water (i.e., the users are "washers" rather than "wipers"), then this anal cleansing water must be drained separately and not be allowed to enter the feces vault.

Some type of dry cover material is usually added to the feces vault directly after each defecation event. The dry cover material may be ash, sawdust, soil, sand, dried leaves, mineral lime, compost, or dried and decomposed feces collected in a UDDT after prudent storage and treatment. The cover material serves to improve aesthetics, control flies, reduce odor and speed up the drying process.

== Terminology ==
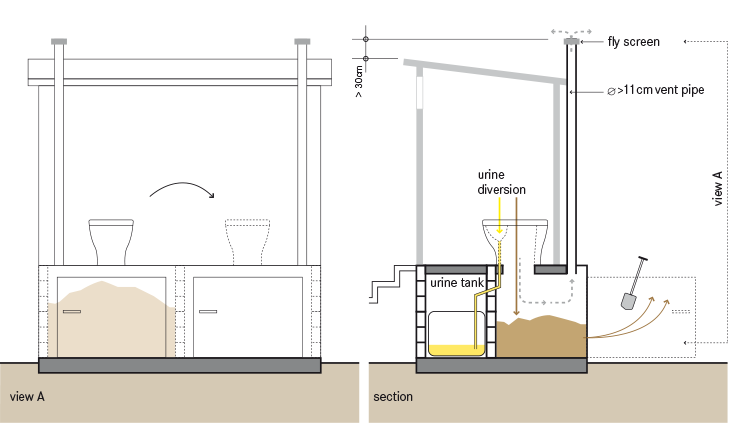
Schematic of the dehydration vaults of a UDDT with two vaults

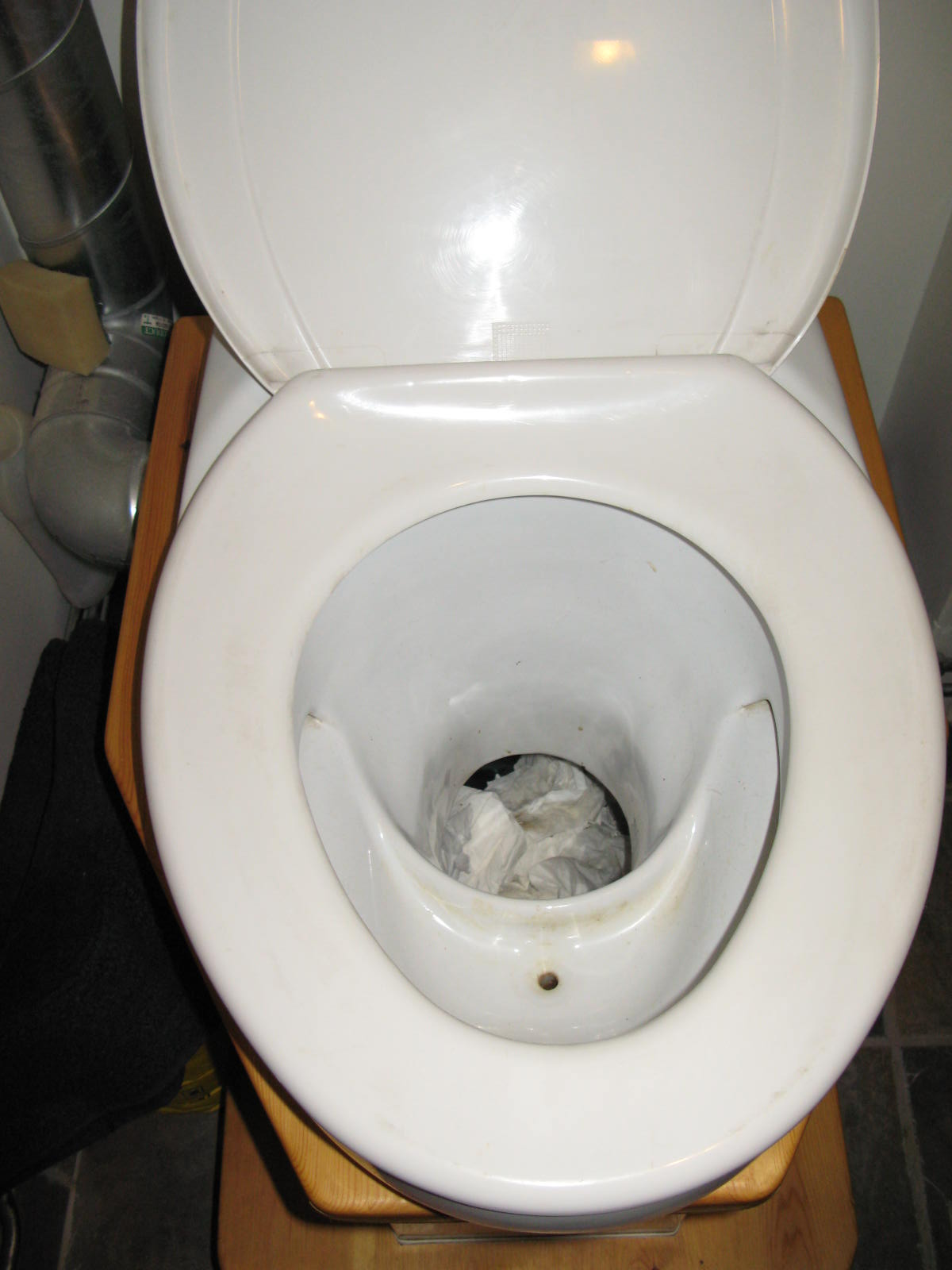
UDDT at Gebers collective housing estate near Stockholm, Sweden

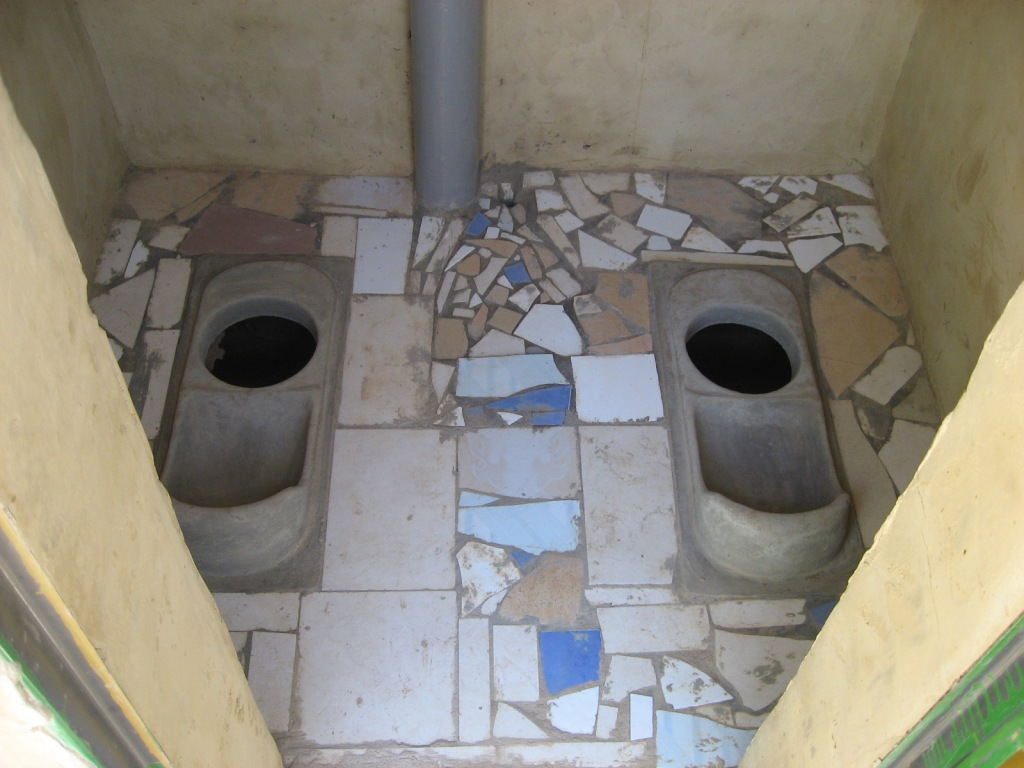
Double-vault UDDT used in squatting position in Ouagadougou, Burkina Faso

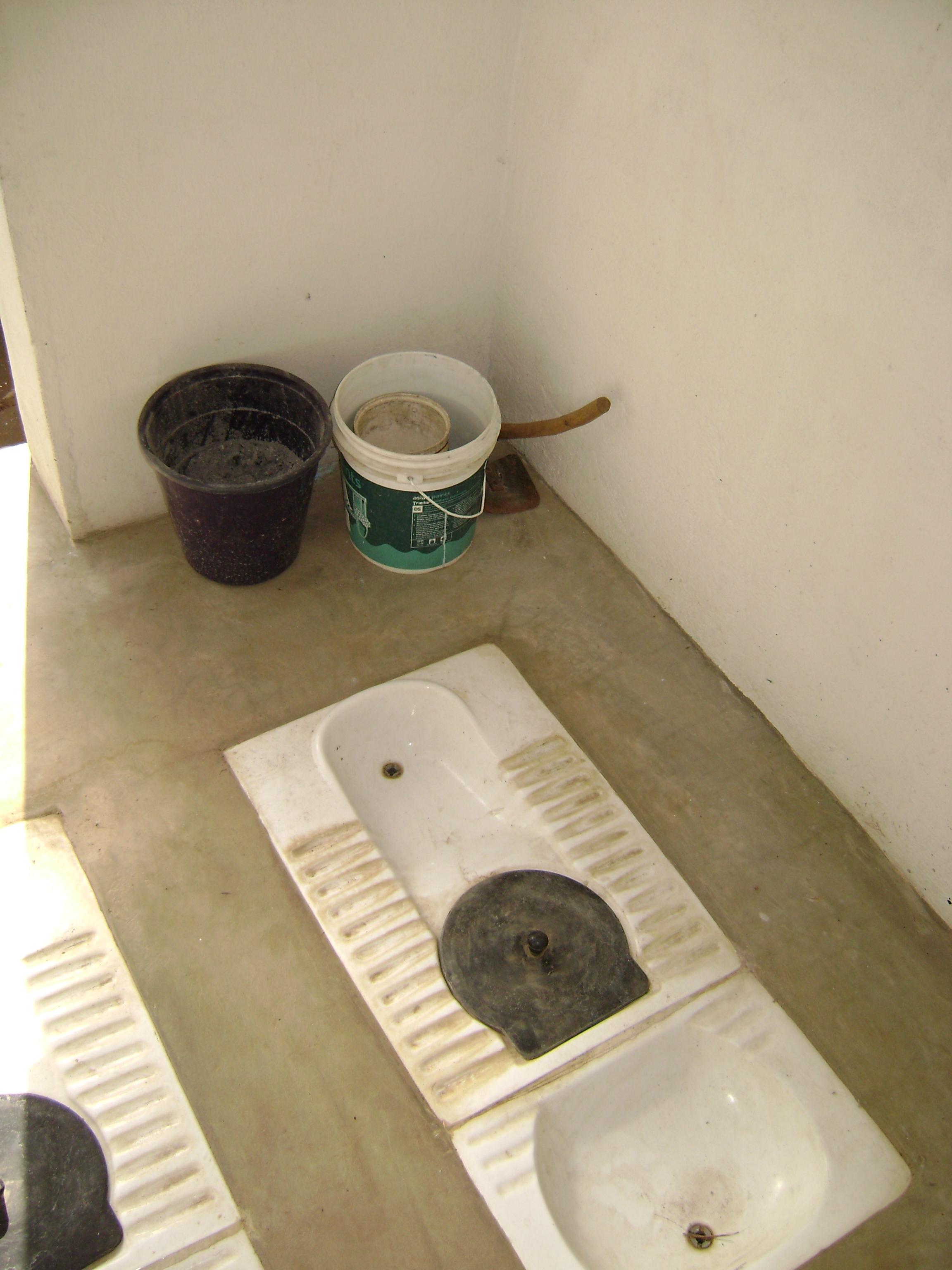
Three-hole urine diversion squatting pan to accommodate anal cleansing with water in Krishnagiri District, Tamil Nadu, India

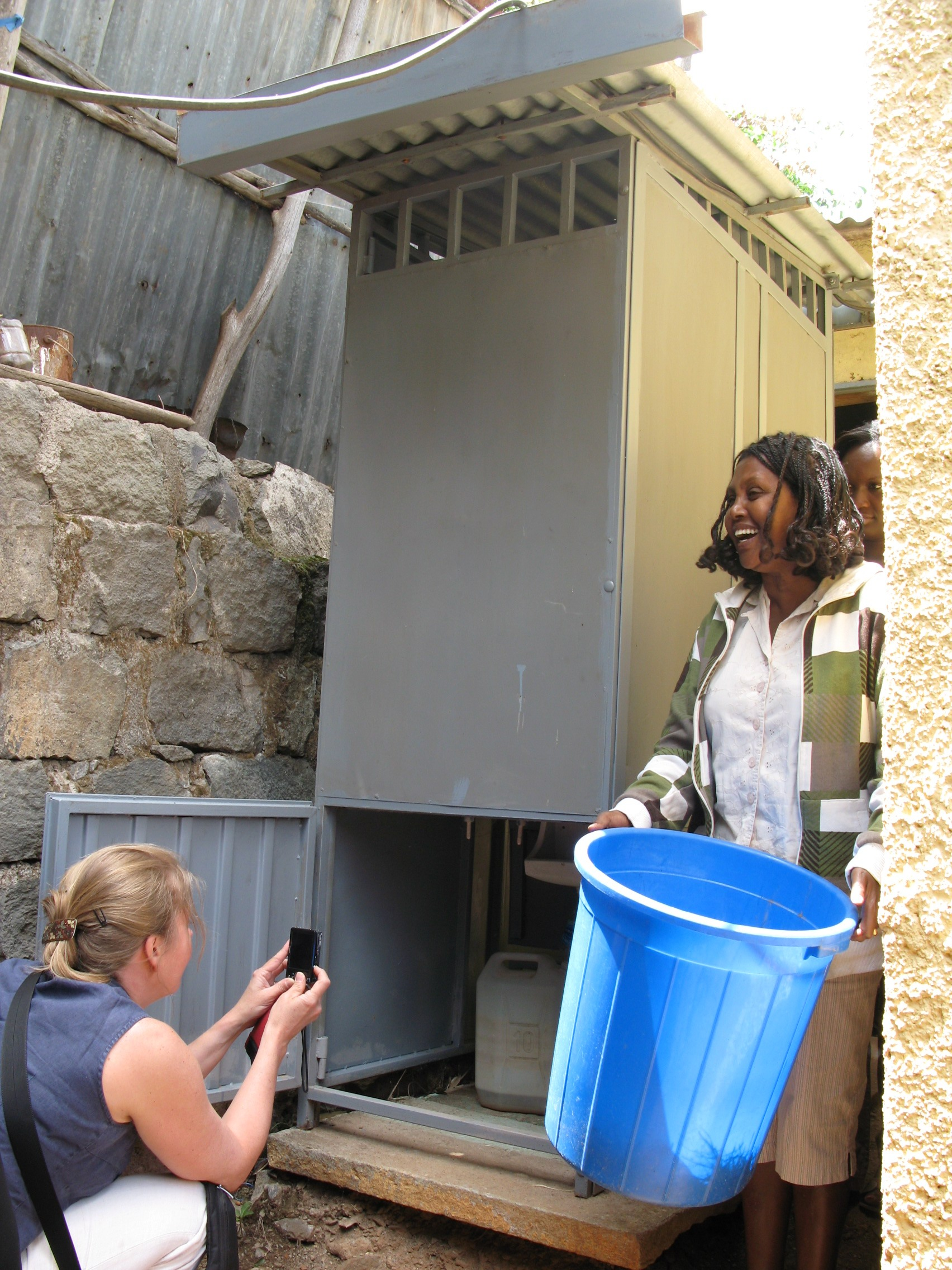
Exchanging the feces container of a low-cost single vault UDDT at a household in Addis Ababa, Ethiopia

Alternative names for UDDTs include "urine diversion" for the "UD" part (instead of "urine-diverting") in connection with terms like "dehydration", "dry", "drying", "desiccation" (for the second "D") which gives quite a high number of possible mutations of the terms that UDDT can stand for. The "T" always stands for toilet. These variations in wording place different emphasis on the amount of drying that takes place in the feces vaults. Probably the most advanced drying takes place in UDDTs that feature two vaults or in UDDTs that have a built-in electrical fan. As a general overarching term the adjective "dry" is better than "dehydration" as it applies to a larger range of UDDT types.

UDDTs are often considered synonymous with "ecosan toilets" (ecological sanitation) or with composting toilets. However, neither of these associations is correct. The term ecosan is in fact much broader and not limited to this type of toilet. Not all UDDTs are used in conjunction with the practice of reusing excreta. There are also many other ecosan technologies that hygienically return nutrients to the food chain, such as subsurface artificial wetlands that produce fodder for cows. In addition, there is usually little composting taking place in the UDDT vaults (instead, it might be carried out in a secondary composting step which is external to the toilets).

Urine-diverting composting toilets are similar to UDDTs in that they also collect urine and feces separately. Treatment is achieved through the composting, a process quite different from pathogen removal by dehydration.

In Malawi, UDDTs are also called Skyloos.

== Appropriateness ==
UDDTs are an interesting alternative for many special situations. For example, when water is scarce, a low-cost solution is required or the soil conditions are such that it is difficult to dig pit latrines. Areas that are frequently flooded are another suitable application for UDDTs.

UDDTs can also be built for schools (many examples exist for example in Kenya, Rwanda and Uganda). However, these school UDDTs suffer from the same issues as any other type of school toilets: if clear responsibilities and a dedicated budget for the maintenance of school toilets is lacking, then the toilets may easily fall into disrepair, for example with blocked urine pipes or feces vaults that are not being emptied.

== Design considerations ==
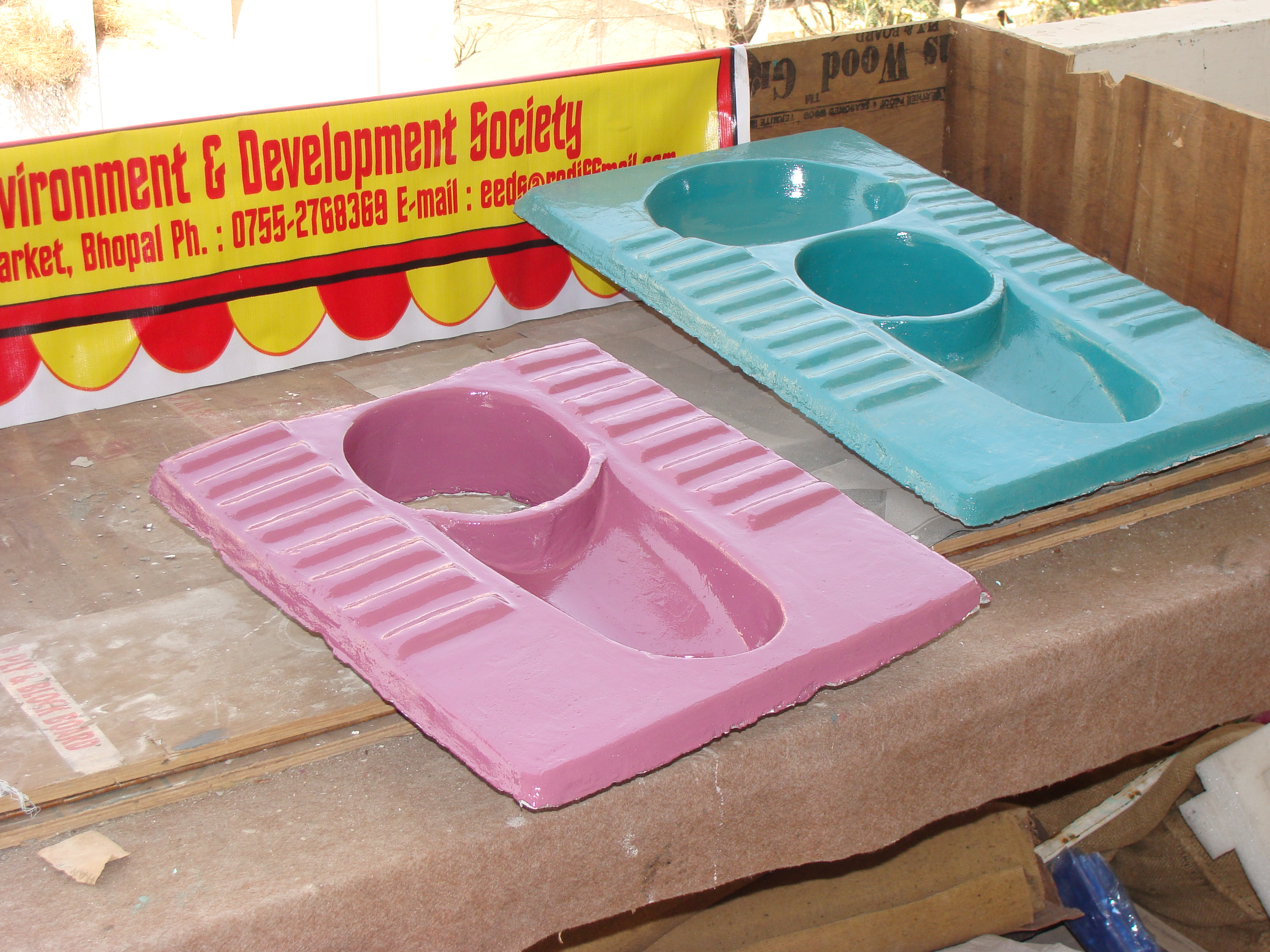
Two-hole (pink) and three-hole (blue) urine diversion ceramic squatting pan from Indian NGO EEDS

=== Fundamentals ===
Urine diversion takes advantage of the anatomy of the human body, which excretes urine and feces separately. In a UDDT, the urine is kept separate and drained via a basin with a small hole near the front of the toilet bowl or squatting pan, while feces fall through a larger drop-hole at the rear. This separate collection – or "source separation" – does not require the user to change positions between urinating and defecating, although some care is needed to ensure the right position over the user interface. Female users may find that some urine may enter the fecal vault during normal operation. This is typically a small amount and does not significantly affect the functioning of the toilet.

The urine separation function can also be achieved by designing the toilet bowl in such a way as to take advantage of the Coandă effect. In this design, users must direct their urine stream against the interior walls of the bowl (usually assisted by a sloping front section) so that it can be collected via a small trough that is recessed into the base of the bowl.

Designers and users of UDDTs should strive to keep the feces pile as dry as possible, as this is the most important factor in the prevention of odor and flies. During storage, the feces' natural moisture slowly evaporates and exits via the vault's ventilation system, or is absorbed by the dry cover material. This process is called drying, dehydration or desiccation.

A UDDT consists of several functional elements. The main ones - which distinguish a UDDT from a pit latrine - are the urine diversion toilet seat or squatting pan, and one or two feces vaults (above ground).

==== Storage and drying time for feces in the vaults ====
The impact of the storage time on the dryness of the feces varies with climatic conditions. A general recommendation that is applicable for all climates is that "the storage duration for feces in double dehydration vaults should be at least six months, as measured from the last addition of fresh fecal matter to the vault".

During the dehydration process moisture is evaporating from the feces and microbes are degrading the organic material. It is the dry conditions together with the storage time itself that lead to the decline of pathogens in the feces. The goal of the dehydration process is to exceed the pathogens' desiccation tolerance (or dryness tolerance) and therefore to significantly reduce their numbers and viability, for example with respect to helminth eggs which are responsible for causing helminth infections in people in developing countries, particularly children.

Fresh feces consist of about 80% water and the majority of this water will evaporate away if it is allowed to do so by the feces not being enclosed in air-tight containers or vaults. The water content of dried feces after six months of drying is usually less than 25%. Depending on the degree of drying and the intended reuse application an additional post-treatment step, such as composting, might be necessary for reuse of excreta in agriculture.

=== Bench design ===
UDDTs can also be built with a bench style toilet seat. This design has been standardised by the company Rotaria del Peru who have built by now 800 double vault bench UDDTs in and around Lima, Peru. This type of toilet has a wide, spacious bench or box, covering both feces chambers, into which two urine diversion toilet seats are integrated.

Users with mobility disabilities can benefit from this kind of design as it is very sturdy (compared to a pedestal-type toilet). The wide bench provides space for an assistant if needed, and handrails can easily be fixed to the walls next to the toilet. Most importantly, this type of UDDT is accessible directly from the ground level and does not require access steps or ramps which are common for many UDDT designs.

=== Accessibility ===
Superstructures associated with UDDTs are sometimes built with steep, narrow stairs and without handrails. This design is not recommended as it can prevent users with disabilities from accessing the toilet. The needs of people with disabilities should always be considered in the design of sanitation systems, and in the case of elevated structures less steep stairs or ramps should be used instead. The aforementioned "bench design" can alleviate the need for stairs.

If a squatting toilet is built, it is useful to add handle bars for people who need support while squatting. For people with disabilities who need physical support while squatting, particularly when cleaning afterwards, a portable seat can be placed on the squat toilet to allow people to sit. When not needed, it can be moved out of the way.

=== Designs for flood prone areas ===
In flood prone locations feces containers or vaults should be located above the flood water levels. If this is not feasible, it is possible to use ferrocement walls to isolate the vault(s) from encroaching flood waters.

=== Source of UDDT components ===
The toilet bowls or squatting pans for UDDTs can be commercially manufactured from plastic or ceramic. Alternatively, they can be fabricated locally from cement or other materials by residents, local companies, NGOs or contractors. Stand-alone UDDT toilets made of plastic with or without built-in electrical fans are also commercially available.

=== Waterless urinals ===
Waterless urinals are often installed alongside UDDTs for the convenience of male users. Urinals also reduce the risk that male users that are standing over the UDDT for urination (instead of sitting or squatting) inadvertently urinate into the feces vault or feces container. It is generally advisable that all UDDT users sit or squat to urinate. If urinals are provided, they can be used for those who prefer a standing position. Female urination devices are also available but they are not necessary for use with UDDTs as women normally sit or squat to urinate, a good posture which minimises urine from getting into the feces vault.

=== Sitting or squatting ===
UDDTs can be built as sitting or as squatting versions to accommodate the users' preference of defecation posture. Some people prefer squatting UDDTs in public places (thought to be more hygienic) but sitting UDDTs for households (thought to be more comfortable). It may be preferable to squat instead of sit for colon health, although this is not specific for UDDTs but may refer to any type of squat toilet.

=== Urban multi-storey buildings ===
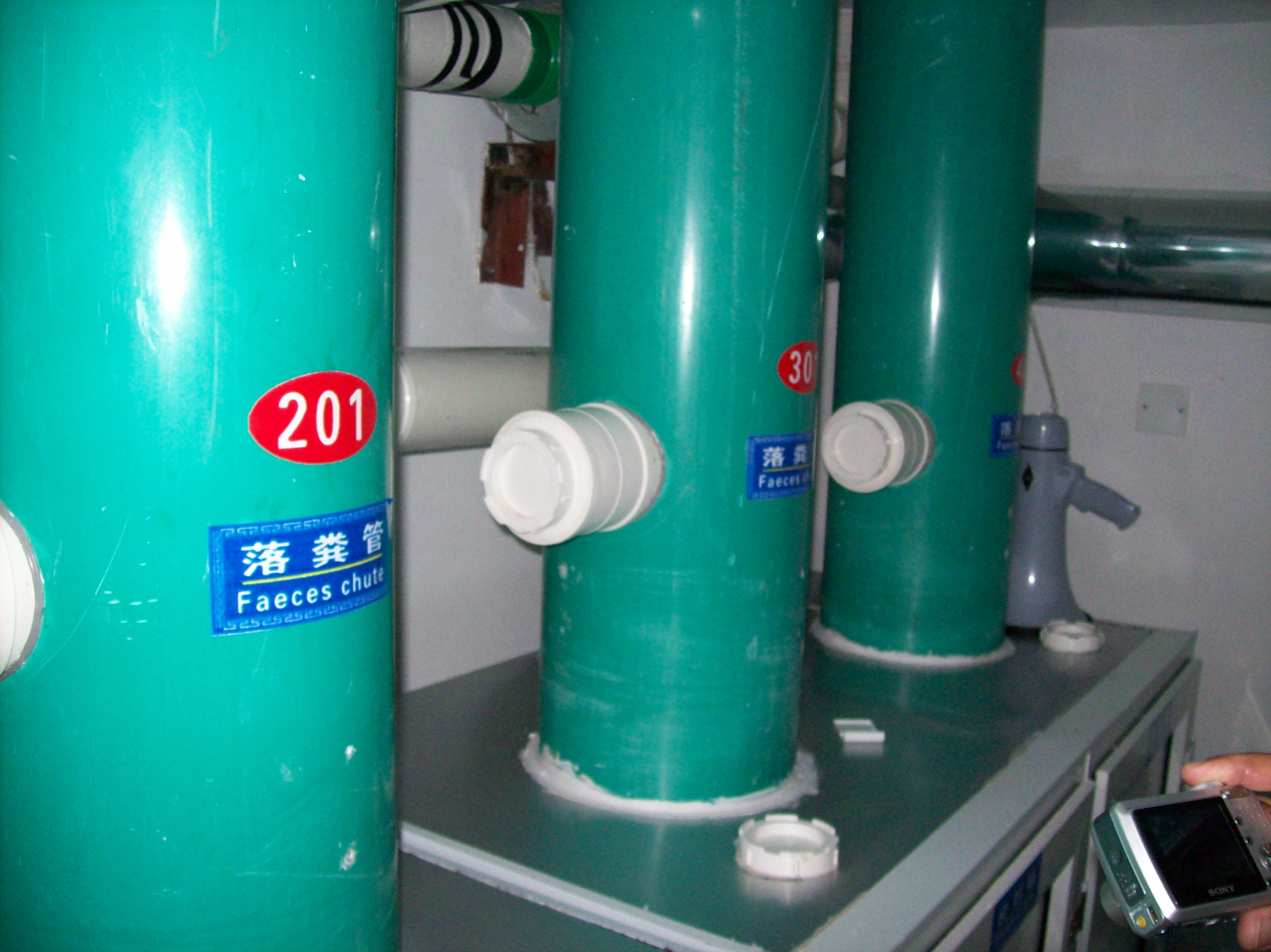
Feces collection chutes are in the basement below the UDDTs in a multi-storey building in Erdos Eco-Town, China.

UDDTs with combined ventilation and collection systems can also be installed in urban multi-storey buildings but only one successful example of such a design exists: the Gebers collective housing estate in Orhem, Sweden.

The use of UDDTs in urban settings of developed countries is still rare, as they come with some significant social, legal and technical challenges.

==== Example of Erdos Eco-Town Project, China ====
A much larger-scale installation which portrays the need to adhere to minimum design and installation standards existed in a project called the "Erdos Eco-Town Project" in Erdos located in the Inner Mongolia Autonomous Region of China. The project was implemented during 2003–2009. This urban installation for 3000 residents in multi-storey buildings utilized UDDTs that shared ventilation and urine collection pipework and made use of chutes that extended down into basements for the collection of feces. The UDDT system was accompanied by greywater treatment facilities, solid waste composting and the reuse of these materials as a fertilizer in agriculture.

However, due to several problems related to improper design and installation, the lack of a cohesive plan to address these deficiencies and the resulting resident objections, the UDDTs were replaced by conventional flush toilets in 2009. The main reasons for why these UDDTs were replaced with flush toilets were odor problems in the apartments as well as problems with the plumbing pipework for the urine pipes and the ventilation system. Another factor was that "water shortage (which had been a driver for dry toilets) was no longer regarded as a problem since a pipeline was built to the Yellow River and deeper fossil water resources were extracted".

== Types ==
=== Single vault ===
UDDTs with a single vault have interchangeable containers to collect the fecal material. Depending on the size of the vault, two or more containers can be stored inside. Containers should be limited to a maximum volume of approximately 50 litres, so that they still can be manually moved when they fill up. Once a container is full, it can be left for further dehydration or removed for further treatment. Removal of the container requires care due to fresh, potentially pathogen-loaded feces being on top of the pile in the container. Because of the limited ventilation within a plastic bucket, such single-vault UDDTs may not reduce the pathogen load as effectively as double-vault UDDTs. Therefore, a post-treatment of the fecal material is usually required. This can be achieved through further dehydration, composting processes or heat treatments.

On the other hand, if the container is made from a material that has a high permeability with air, such as woven sacks or baskets, then the drying performance in single vault UDDTs may be similar to that of double vault UDDTs.

=== Double vault ===
Double-vault UDDTs are alternatively called twin-vault, two-vault or two-chambered UDDTs. In double-vault UDDTs, the fecal material dehydrates in situ. The two above-ground vaults are used alternately. While one vault is filling up, the other (full) one stores the fecal material under dry conditions for at least six months. During this resting period, no fresh feces are allowed to enter the full vault. In order to switch from one vault to the other, the user interface can either be switched or both vaults can be equipped with fixed seats and a cover sufficient to prevent access to the full vault. When the second vault becomes full and at least six months have passed, the first vault is emptied with a shovel and then the user interface is moved over accordingly. The vaults are commonly sized so that one vault fills up in six to twelve months.

=== Other (portable, mobile) ===
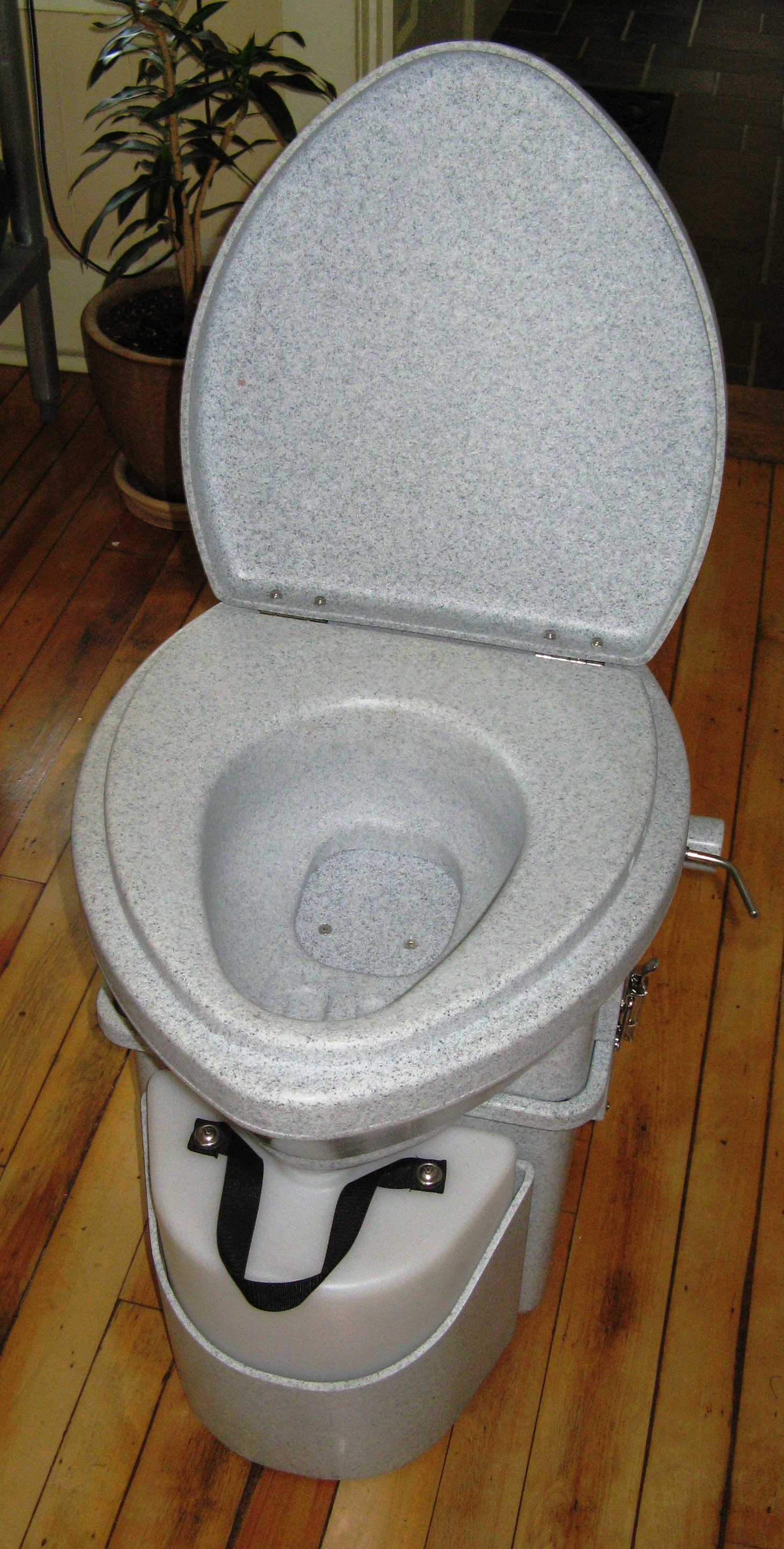
Example of a portable (mobile) UDDT constructed out of molded plastic at a household in Vermont, U.S.

Other types of UDDTs exist which are essentially variations of the single-vault type, but which are more self-contained, sometimes referred to as portable, mobile or stand-alone units and identifiable by their one-piece molded plastic shells or, in the case of DIY versions, simple plywood box construction. Most users of self-contained UDDTs rely upon a post-treatment process to ensure pathogen reduction. This post-treatment may consist of long-term storage or addition to an existing or purpose-built compost pile or some combination thereof. A post-treatment step is unnecessary in the case of very modest seasonal use.

Mobile UDDTs are typically either fabricated of new materials in a factory or workshop using a mix of proprietary and off-the-shelf parts—and then sold to the public either directly or via distributors or retail outlets; or fabricated at home out of wood, using new and re-purposed parts and materials. They are typically compact and lightweight, allowing one person to easily lift, transport, and maneuver them into place. Likewise, installation is a relatively simple process given that everything needed for the proper functioning of the toilet, except a source of electrical power for those models that include a fan and some allowance for exterior ventilation, is contained within the molded or wooden carcass. One advantage of this type of UDDT is that they are portable, making them an interesting option for remote or temporary installations and for installations aboard moving vehicles or non-stationary residences such as boats, recreational-vehicles (i.e. caravan, camper van, motor home) and tiny-houses.

Features common to this type of UDDT include:

- a smooth, easy-to-clean exterior surface
- a molded seat with a cover (both or either sometimes fitted with a rubber or neoprene gasket to further assist in isolating the toilet's inner workings)
- a molded urine diversion bowl (or bucket and funnel assembly) to facilitate the separate collection and storage in separate containers of urine and feces (the containers consisting of either a proprietary design or, in the case of DIY versions, readily-available or re-purposed buckets, bottles or jugs)
- some allowance for either passive or active mechanical ventilation either consisting of a screened or filtered air inlet and a screened or filtered exhaust outlet (the latter consisting of a standard fitting to allow hook-up to a length of piping or tubing that is connected to the outdoors).

Features unique to some designs include:

- cleats for fastening the toilet to the floor (particularly useful when the toilet is installed in a moving vehicle or non-stationary residence)
- spill-proof urine storage to aid in leak-prevention during stormy weather or when otherwise underway (as in a moving boat or RV)
- built-in agitator for mixing and aerating the contents of the feces container (which greatly aids in drying and odor prevention)
- automatically or manually deployed pivoting or hinged trap door for covering the feces container when not in use.

== Health aspects ==
During normal use, a UDDT is just as hygienic and safe to use as any other type of toilet. However, health aspects need to be considered during removal and emptying of the urine and feces containers of a UDDT. These health risks during emptying of the feces vault or container are significantly lower when compared to emptying the pit of pit latrines or the buckets of some types of dry toilets without urine diversion. However, the health risks are somewhat higher when compared to a flush toilet where the user does not have to carry out any emptying or maintenance tasks at the household level unless the flush toilet plugs, back-flows or otherwise experiences operating problems.

Compared to a flush toilet being flushed without closing its lid, a UDDT would have a lower risk of Clostridioides difficile spreading via aerosolization, as it does not involve turbulent water.

Regarding the health risks associated with reuse activities, the World Health Organization's guidelines' from 2006 titled "Guidelines for the safe use of wastewater, excreta and greywater in agriculture" explain the management of health risks associated with the use of excreta in agriculture. The key concept in these guidelines is the multiple barrier approach which can also be applied to reuse activities in connection with UDDTs.

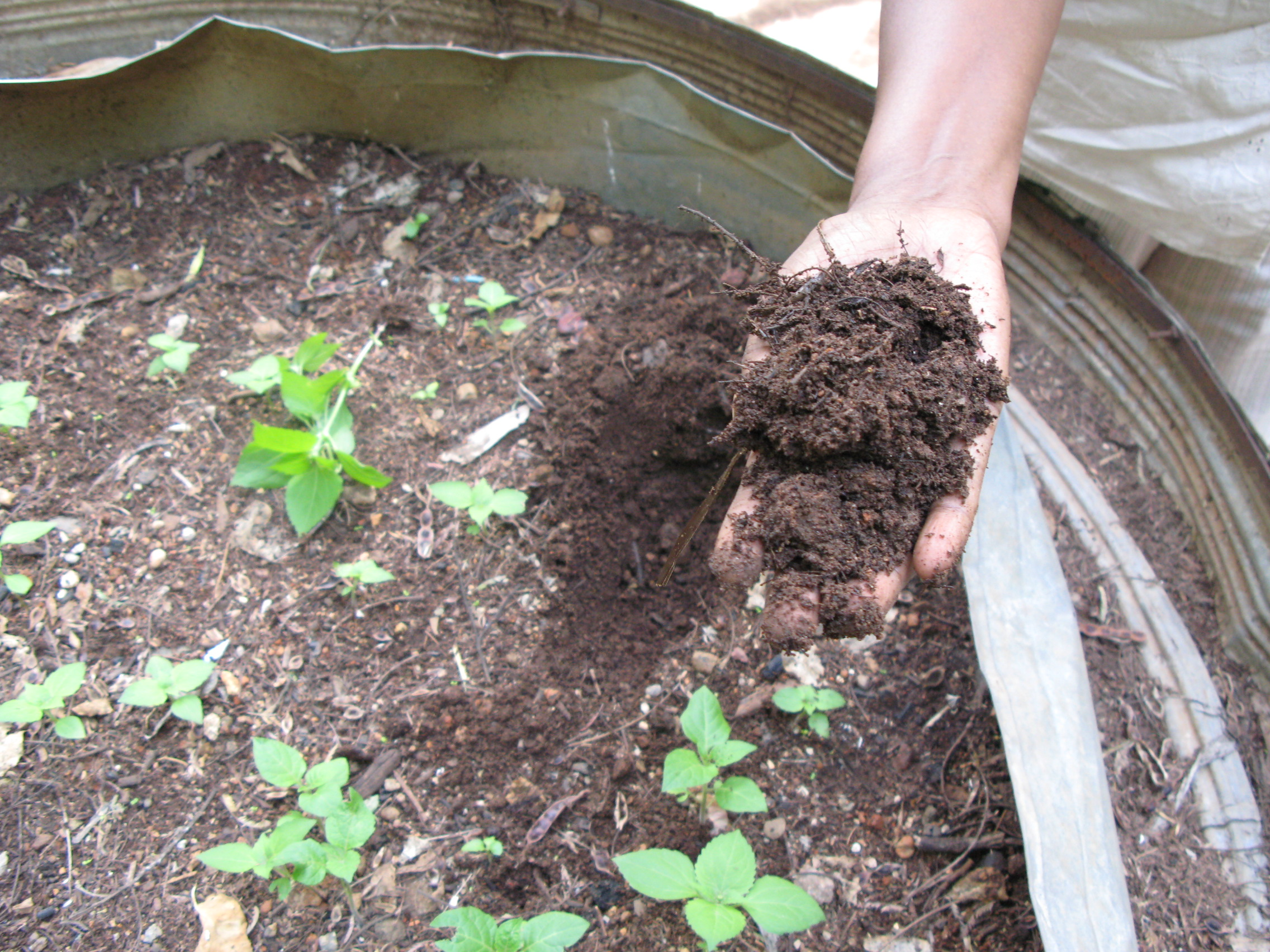
Dried fecal matter from UDDTs after external composting, now ready for reuse (Addis Ababa, Ethiopia)

== Usage ==
=== Wiping materials ===
For wiping of the anal area after defecation—or for wiping after urination—UDDT users can avail themselves of the same materials that are utilized while using other types of toilets. Suitable biodegradable materials available in the surroundings can also be used, such as toilet paper, leaves, corn cobs or sticks. These materials are deposited along with feces in the feces portion of the toilet so that everything can eventually decompose together. For example, in Ecuador the soft, perfumed leaves of Piper auritum, Piperaceae and Melastomataceae are being used. Users have also used stones, although this makes the vault fill up very fast and is therefore not practical for UDDTs.

For portable UDDTs in particular, used toilet paper can alternatively be placed in a separate waste bin (for subsequent incineration, composting or disposal), as the addition of soiled toilet paper into the relatively small feces container could otherwise lead to it being filled rather quickly with mainly just toilet paper.

=== Anal cleansing with water ===
UDDTs can accommodate users who prefer anal cleansing with water rather than with toilet paper by utilising either a three-hole urine diversion squatting pan or an area and drain next to the urine diversion pedestal where washing can take place—away from the urine and feces holes. This is essential so as not to contaminate the urine and to keep the feces as dry as possible.

Due to the fecal content of anal cleansing water, it should be considered as blackwater and treated or disposed of accordingly. Anal cleansing water can be drained into a soak pit, planted mulch bed or an infiltration trench. The anal cleansing water should be discharged into coarse material below the ground, but well above the water table to avoid groundwater pollution.

Some UDDT designs are arranged such that the users do their anal cleansing with water above the urine compartment. This may be done for simplicity reasons, i.e. in order to avoid the need for a third hole and drain pipe for the anal cleansing water. This mixture of urine and anal cleansing water requires further treatment to remove pathogens before it can be safely utilized in agriculture.

Water for anal cleansing can be supplied via a hose or spigot fed by a pressurized water delivery system or a gravity fed system supplied by a rainwater tank located overhead or from a water bottle or jug that the user carries into the toilet cubicle.

=== Cover materials ===
For most UDDT types, users are encouraged to add a handful or scoopful of dry cover material directly after each defecation event. This cover material is added to promote dry conditions in the feces vault (by absorbing moisture), to control odor, to prevent infestation by flies and to create a visual barrier for the next user. It is also important to ensure that enough air can flow through the pile of drying feces. For this reason bulky or fibrous material that is dry and that decomposes slowly is recommended. A range of cover materials and combinations of these materials can be used, depending on what is readily available: Sawdust, rice hulls (suitable in areas where rice is grown), soil, wood ash (might not be available in sufficient volumes). Lime can also be used but is often more expensive than other options. Lime and wood ash both have the advantage of raising the pH value of the feces pile, thus adding to the pathogen killing abilities.

It can be beneficial to select the cover material carefully in order to not only cover the feces but also to inoculate them with beneficial soil microbes. In that case, finished compost could be used as cover material.

==== No cover materials added ====
In some circumstances and for reasons of simplicity, it can be sufficient to not use cover materials at all or to use toilet paper itself as cover material. One example is the case where the UDDT has a mechanized ventilation system and a view guard, like the UDDTs manufactured by Separett and Green Loo. Also in the case of public toilets, it can be easier to let the caretaker perform the task of adding cover material, rather than the user.

== Resulting products ==
=== Dried feces ===
==== Further treatment ====
The required degree of treatment for the collected dried feces depends entirely on whether this product will be reused in agriculture. If it is not reused, but only buried, then no further treatment is required. The dried feces are in almost all cases not entirely sanitized when removed from a vault of the UDDT, so careful handling is obligatory. In scenarios wherein excreta is to be reused in agriculture, a secondary treatment of fecal matter and storage of urine is advisable to ensure adequate sanitization. Fecal material from single vault UDDTs must always be post-treated, even if just via prolonged storage. Fecal material from double vaults has typically passed a certain storage time and is therefore already more sanitized. However, a secondary form of treatment is optional but recommended for household systems and required for large-scale systems.

Secondary treatment can be performed at the community or household level and can include thermophilic composting where fecal material is composted at over 50 °C, prolonged storage with the duration of 1.5 to two years, chemical treatment with ammonia from urine to inactivate the pathogens, solar sanitation for further drying or heat treatment to eliminate pathogens. The most difficult pathogens to eliminate from the drying feces in the feces vaults are the helminth eggs which can cause helminth infections.

==== Reuse in agriculture or burial ====
Reuse of treated feces in agriculture—like reuse of excreta in agriculture in general—can result in increased crop production through fertilizing effects of nitrogen, phosphorus, potassium and improved soil fertility through organic carbon. If the dried feces are not reused in agriculture they can instead be buried at a minimum depth of 25 cm in which case they normally do not pose a public health risk.

=== Urine ===
==== Further treatment ====
The required degree of treatment for the collected urine depends entirely on whether this product will be reused in agriculture. If it is not reused, but only infiltrated, then no further treatment is required.

Urine that leaves the body of a healthy person is close to being sterile and requires much less treatment for pathogen removal than feces or fecal sludge. However, a contamination of urine with fecal pathogens is possible if the UDDT is not used correctly, i.e. when some fecal matter finds its way into the urine compartment. Also, for a few specific diseases, the relevant pathogens may be found in the urine; for example: Leptospira interrogans, Salmonella typhi, Salmonella paratyphi, Schistosoma haematobium, BK virus or Simian virus. The Ebola virus may also be found in urine from an infected person. The exact survival time of this particular virus in human urine outside of the human body is unclear but probably "up to several days" like with other body fluids at room temperature.

For these reasons, urine should always be treated for pathogen removal if it is going to be reused, unless reuse occurs at the same household where the urine was collected and on crops that are only consumed by these household members (in which case an infection among family members is more likely to occur via handshakes and hugs than via urine reuse activities).

The simplest and most common method of urine treatment for pathogen removal is via storage in closed vessels. The decomposition of urea that is present in urine into ammonia and hydrocarbonate leads to an increase in ammonia concentration and an increase of pH value to above 9. These two processes lead to pathogen reduction. Warm temperatures and low dilution of the urine with water increase pathogen removal.

Storage of urine kills bacterial pathogens encountered in urine – including Salmonella typhi and paratyphi and Mycobacterium tuberculosis'' – in a relatively short time span: a storage time of five weeks at temperatures below 20 °C or of two weeks at temperatures above 20 °C has been recommended to prevent transmission of mycobacteria when recycling human urine.

Recommended storage times to kill pathogens in urine vary from one to six months depending on ambient temperatures, the scale of the urine collection system and which crops will be fertilised with the urine.

==== Reuse in agriculture or infiltration ====
Reuse of treated urine in agriculture—like reuse of excreta in agriculture in general—can result in increased crop production through fertilizing effects of nitrogen, phosphorus, potassium and improved soil fertility through organic carbon. Urine from the UDDTs can safely be used as nitrogen-rich and phosphorus and potassium containing fertilizer after a recommended storage period for pathogen reduction (see above under "Further Treatment").

In cases where no reuse is possible or desired, urine is usually infiltrated in the soil unless this practice would cause groundwater pollution. In eThekwini municipality in South Africa or in Lima, Peru, for example, urine from UDDTs is safely infiltrated into the soil because the groundwater level is very low there and the groundwater is not used for any particular purpose. Infiltration can be done by directing the urine to a soak pit or by running a perforated urine pipe from the toilet to an area outside, where the hose is sloping gently downhill (for rural areas). Clogging of the pipe's holes can be avoided by ensuring there are no T-junctions, no joints and that a plastic mesh is installed in the urine funnel of the toilet to keep everything other than urine out.

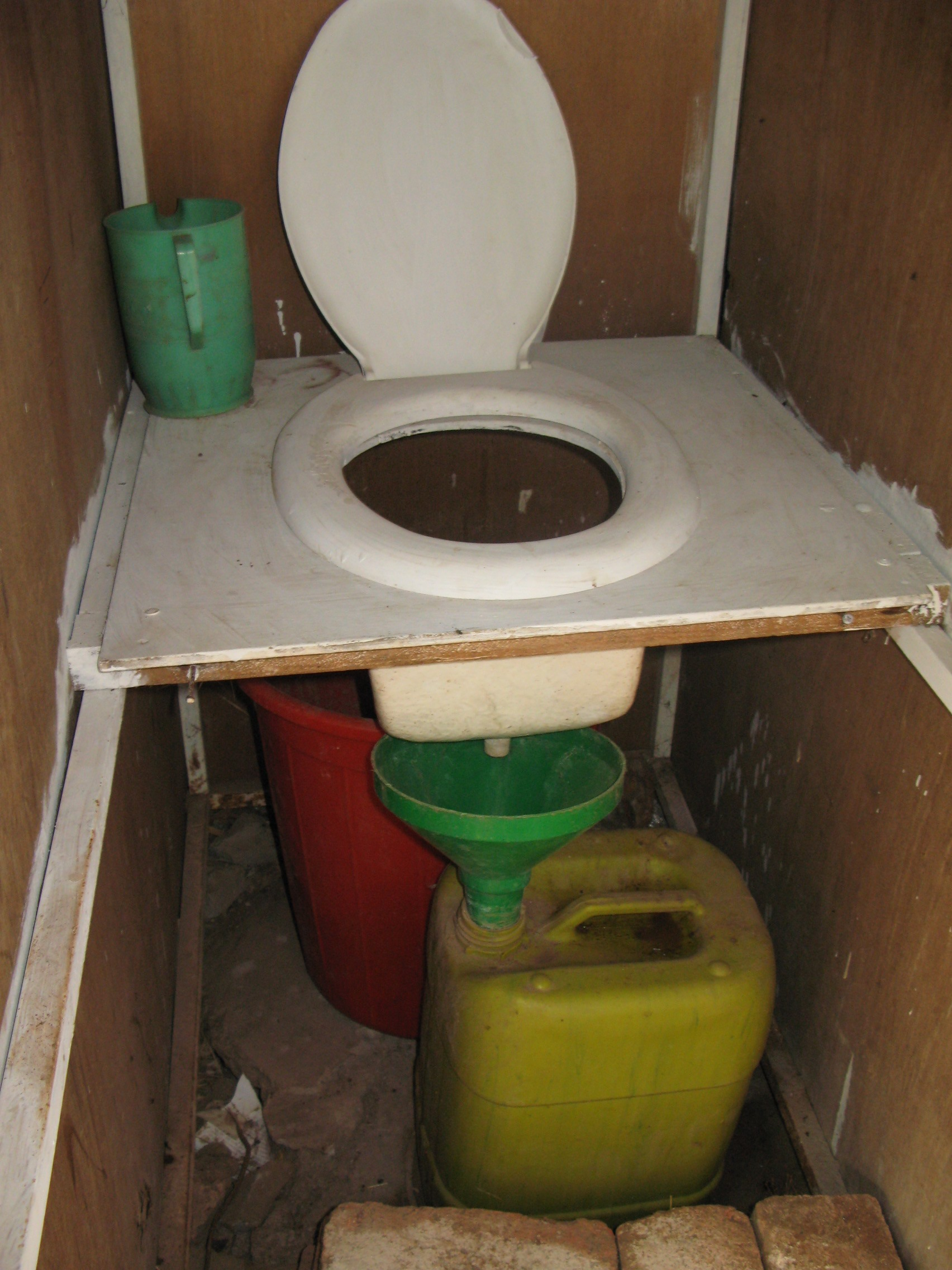
Very simple home-made design for a UDDT with a funnel for urine collection and a bucket for feces collection at a household in Addis Ababa, Ethiopia

== Comparison ==
=== Pit latrines ===
Reasons for keeping urine and feces separate in a UDDT compared to a pit latrine can be to:

- reduce odor (because mixing urine and feces together causes a lot of odor);
- avoid production of wet, odorous fecal sludge, which has to be removed by someone when the pit latrine is full;
- allow for the recovery of treated excreta so that it can be used as a fertilizer or soil enhancement.

The advantage of UDDTs compared to pit latrines is the conversion of feces into a dry odorless material and therefore an avoidance of the issues surrounding liquid fecal sludge management (e.g. odor, fly attraction, difficulties in pit emptying). A well-maintained UDDT is an odor and insect free toilet which is appreciated by users and allows simple removal and far less offensive and safer handling of the fecal material once the feces vault has filled up. Moreover, the risk of water pollution is minimised through the safe containment of feces in above-ground vaults and this allows the toilets to be constructed in locations where pit-based systems are not appropriate.

UDDTs with vaults are also more permanent structures than most pit latrines, the latter of which in rural areas are typically relocated when the pit is full rather than emptying the pit. Therefore, pit latrines need more space and people are less willing to invest in a higher quality super-structure as it will have to be dismantled and moved at some point.

In the experience of the non-governmental organisation WECF who introduced UDDTs in EECCA countries to people who had pit latrines, it was most successful converting people who were in regions lacking a reliable water supply and wastewater management. Since the introduction required behavior change in the recipients, WECF considered awareness raising and training by local partners to be important.

=== Sewer- and septic tank-based sanitation ===
The comparison of UDDTs with sewer-based sanitation systems (sewerage and wastewater treatment plants) is not as straightforward as the comparison with pit latrines as a sewer does not only deal with excreta management like a UDDT does, but it also transports greywater, municipal wastewater, stormwater and industrial wastewater. However, the installation of UDDTs in all households connected to a common sewer would result in vastly reduced volumes of water, nutrients and organic matter that arrive at the associated wastewater treatment plant.

Sewer-based excreta management is impractical in many regions due to limited water supplies and the high cost of sewer systems and wastewater treatment plants. Furthermore, water-based sanitation systems (flush toilets) dilute excreta and create vast wastewater streams, something that UDDTs do not.

Similarly, the comparison between UDDTs and septic tank-based sanitation systems is not as straightforward as the comparison with pit latrines as a septic system also treats greywater. However, the relatively high costs of septic systems, particularly mound-type septic systems can be partially mitigated or, if used in conjunction with an onsite greywater system, eliminated altogether by installing UDDTs in place of flush toilets.

Portable UDDTs offer the potential advantages of greater local control and quick deployment which is particularly useful when there is no capable centralized institutional infrastructure in place or no financial ability to implement larger centralized systems.

==== Pharmaceutical residues and other micropollutants ====
The separate, waterless collection and treatment of urine and feces in UDDTs prevents hormones, pharmaceutical residues and other micropollutants which are contained in human excreta from entering surface water or groundwater via treated sewage. This is because in conventional sewage treatment plants, these micropollutants are only partially removed and the remainder is discharged into surface water, possibly reaching the groundwater. Detected concentrations of pharmaceutical residues in groundwater were in the order of 50 ng/L in several locations in Germany.

Moreover, micropollutants can also become concentrated in sewage sludge. Following treatment, sewage sludge is either landfilled, incinerated, applied on agricultural land or, in some cases, retailed or given away for free to the general public. Each of these disposal options comes with myriad potential—and in some cases proven—hazards for human health and environment impacts of these chemicals. By not mixing human excreta with water and the other contaminants that are disposed of in sewers and septic tanks, UDDTs avoid many of the problems associated with these practices.

If the excreta collected from UDDTs is treated further and buried or used as agricultural or horticultural fertilizer then the pharmaceutical residues in the excreta will be degraded better in terrestrial systems (soil) than in aquatic systems. Therefore, UDDTs (or in fact all urine diversion systems) have an advantage over sewer-based sanitation systems with respect to these problem of micro-pollutants.

== Challenges ==
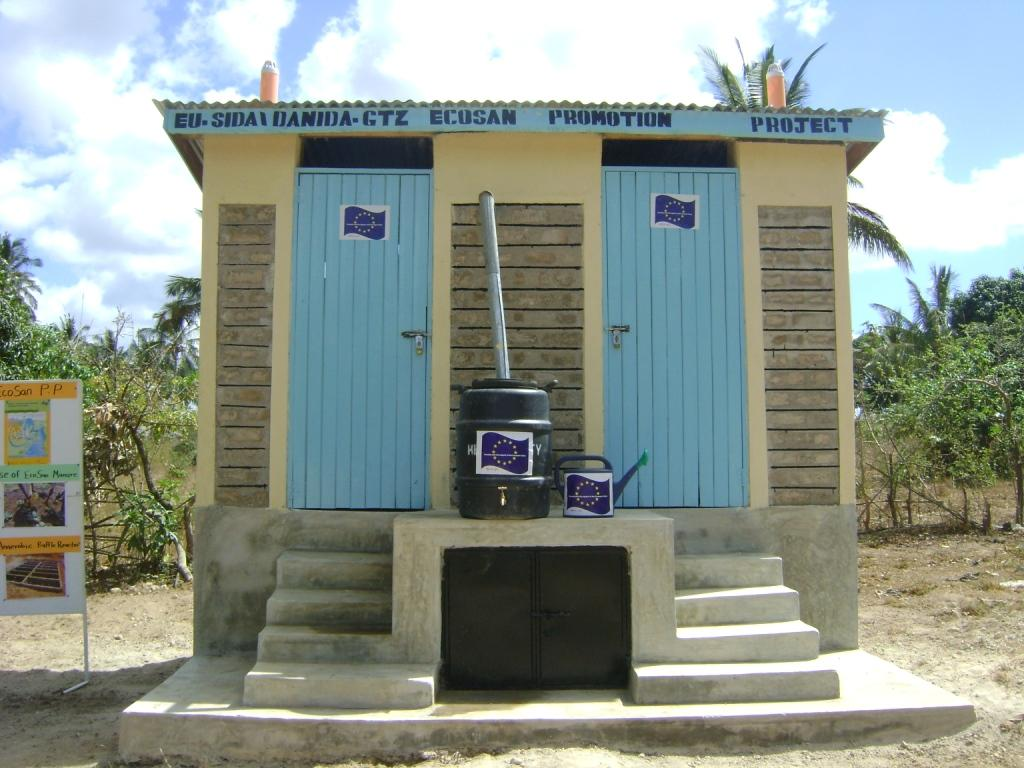
School UDDT in rural areas of Western Kenya; the steep stairs are not recommended as they are a barrier for people with disabilities

=== Operational issues ===
There are several operational problems that can happen with UDDTs. The main ones are: Urine may accumulate in the urine diversion section of the toilet due to blockages in the urine pipe; odor coming from the feces vault because the contents of the feces vault have become too wet. In this case also flies, other insects or rodents may appear in the feces vault.

If there is insufficient commitment, user preparation, follow-up and support, such operational problems can lead to failure of UDDT pilot projects.

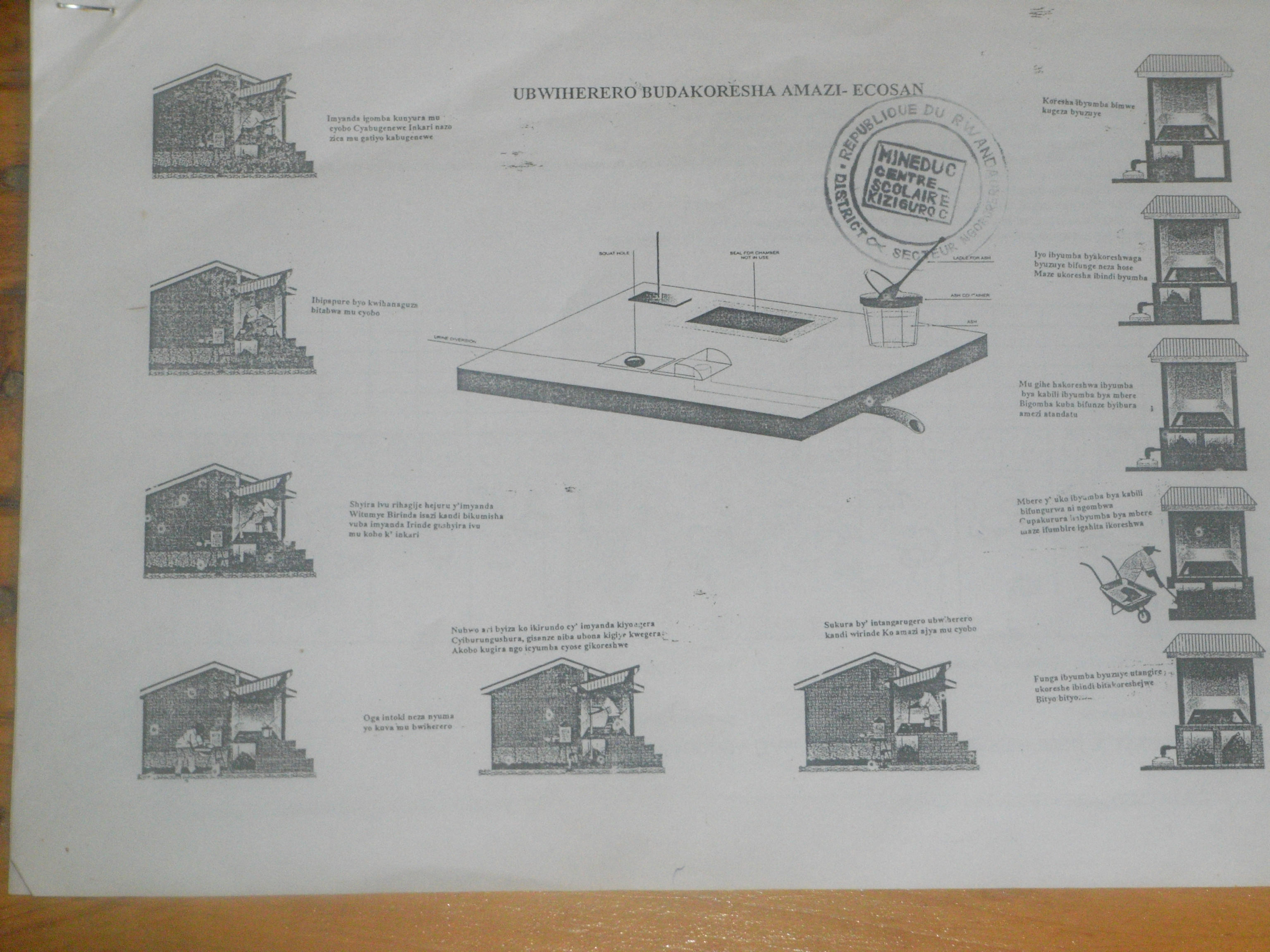
Instructional guide for using a UDDT in the Kinyarwanda language, Rwanda

== Costs ==
UDDTs are sometimes considered too expensive compared to pit latrines, but this criticism does not include the cost of emptying pits and the potential value of fertilizers that can be recycled via UDDTs should the users wish to do so (noting that most UDDT installations worldwide currently do not reuse excreta in agriculture). Rather than looking only at construction costs, long-term operational costs and benefits should also be considered, especially since the regular emptying or re-building of pit latrines may be a significant expense. When a period of for example 10 years is considered, UDDTs may well be the more economical alternative, since the emptying of feces vaults is simple and safer, thus less expensive, even if users decide to enter into a contract with someone else to do this.

Compared to flush toilets connected to sewer systems and wastewater treatment plants, UDDTs are usually less expensive. However, to enable accurate comparisons of costs, this needs to be assessed on a case-by-case basis because the sewer system and treatment plant also transports and treats greywater whereas the UDDT does not. This means that the two systems provide a different level of service to the user. An example calculation for such a cost comparison exists for the case of Lima, Peru.

There is even a minimalist UDDT model that costs essentially nothing to construct and which only requires salvaging and assembling selected plastic items from the garbage and which can be implemented by the poorest people, disaster victims, and those who want to gain experience with UDDTs.

== History ==
The UDDTs with two dehydration vaults that are known today were originally designed around 1950 in Japan and further developed in Vietnam in the 1960s as a means of increasing the hygienic safety of excreta reused in agriculture. This means their development was originally closely linked to the ecosan (ecological sanitation) approach to optimizing resource recovery of nutrients and organic matter in agriculture. Beginning in the early part of the 2000s, UDDTs have been seen increasingly as a toilet type that can provide advantages even without any reuse activities attached to it.

Since the 1990s, modifications of this design (such as the addition of ventilation piping to the feces vault) have been developed in many countries. Prefabricated ceramic or plastic urine diversion squatting pans and pedestals have become available on the market, generally increasing the durability and perceived prestige associated with the system.

UDDTs have also been commercially produced in Sweden since the mid-1990s. For example, between 1994 and 2010 the Separett company sold approximately 200,000 UDDTs. Numerous off-the shelf commercial products are now available and are used in locations where a connection to a sanitary sewer system is not possible, permitted or desired such as in remote summer cottages or for camping activities. At all times, users have also been building their own low-cost UDDTs with simple materials such as a funnel connected to a hose, a bucket and a seat.

== Examples ==
=== South Africa (eThekwini Municipality, Durban) ===
The highest number of UDDTs in one area have been installed by the eThekwini Municipality in the non-sewered peri-urban areas of Durban, South Africa. To date, about 80,000 UDDTs are in operation in that area, serving about 500,000 residents (reuse of urine or excreta is currently not taking place).

=== Haiti ===
The NGO SOIL in Haiti began building UDDTs and composting plants in Port-au-Prince as part of the 2010 Haiti earthquake emergency relief effort in northern Haiti. They have since branched out into providing toilets for residential use, this being their primary goal moving forward as they transition their focus from emergency relief to providing sustainable and ecological sanitation for paying customers. Their current dry toilet design for households includes a small portable single vault unit made out of wood that is either fitted with a single container for combined excreta collection or with a urine diversion insert, with 80% of these installations currently being of the UDDT type. As of 2014, SOIL has transformed all of their public UDDT vault toilets to an open vault design with removable plastic drums for feces collection. This improves the processes by which feces is collected and transported to their waste treatment facility, making their business now a fully "container-based system". This allows SOIL to respond to heavy use (since their toilets were filling up too quickly) and ensures a safe final product for reuse. In most cases, these UDDTs utilize soak pits (normally located directly beneath the toilet superstructure) for onsite disposal of urine.

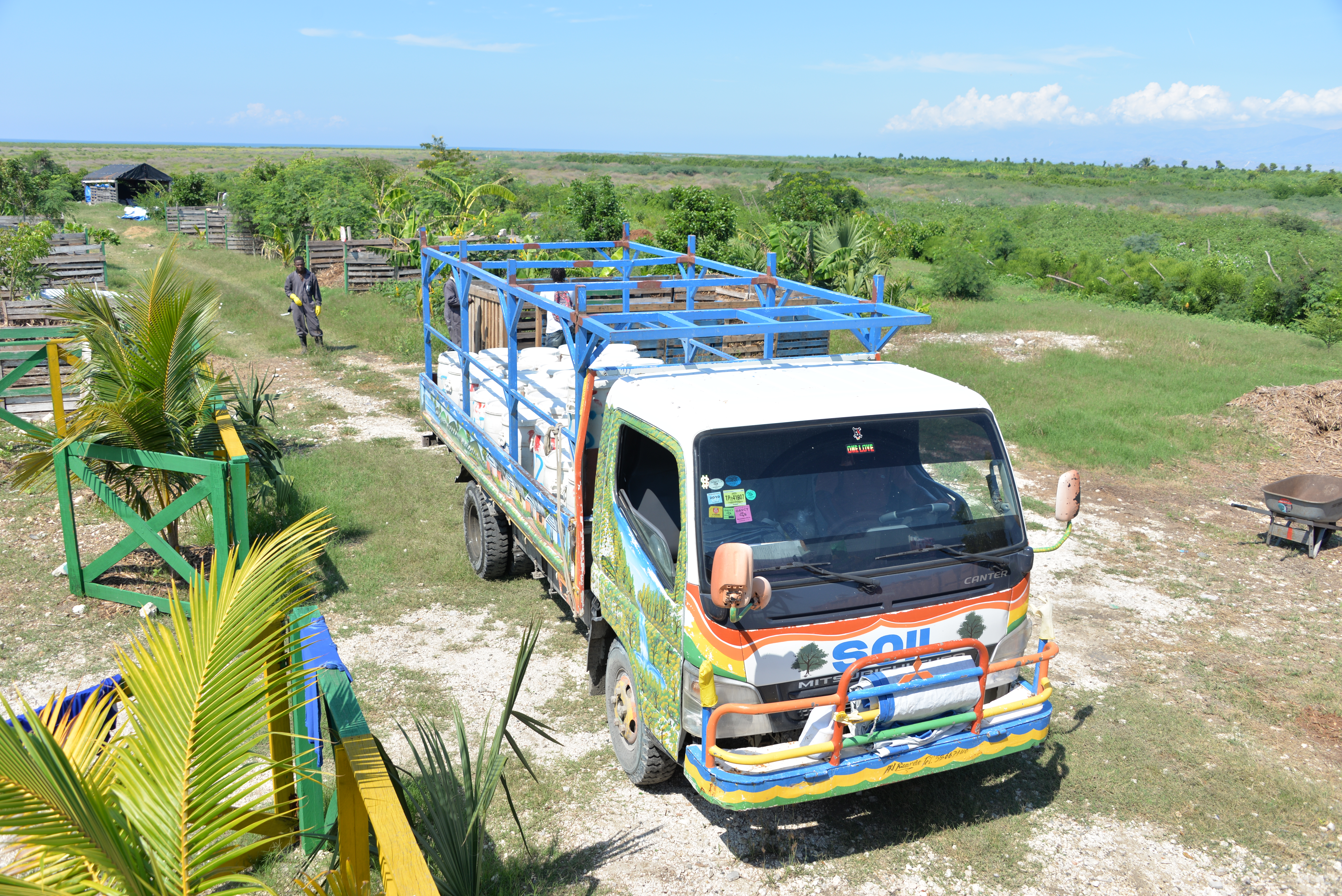
A SOIL truck delivering buckets of human excreta from mobile household UDDTs to the SOIL composting facility in Port-au-Prince, Haiti

SOIL continues to provide humanitarian relief in some of Haiti's most vulnerable communities – notably those that have been particularly impacted by the cholera epidemic – by providing free access to public container-based UDDTs for over 3,500 people. Additionally, over 2,000 people currently have access to a SOIL "EcoSan toilet" through the "EkoLakay" business pilot.

Since building the first waste treatment facility in Haiti in 2009, SOIL has become one of the largest waste treatment operations in the country. SOIL's two composting waste treatment facilities currently transform over 20,000 U.S. gallons (76,000 liters) of human waste into safe, organic, agricultural-grade compost every month. The compost produced at these facilities is sold to farmers, organizations, businesses, and institutions around the country to help finance SOIL's waste treatment operations.

=== Ecuador ===
Hundreds of UDDTs have been built in Ecuador to date. The various models in use adapt to different preferences, budgets and conditions, and the need to sometimes transport materials to remote locations by small airplanes.

Many of these UDDTs serve indigenous communities who live along small rivers as well as ecotourism operations in the Amazonian part of the country. In these regions, piped water supply is often lacking, clay-rich soils do not permit infiltration of wastewater, and the groundwater level is usually high. These factors make other types of toilets or other forms of excreta management problematic. For example, local governments and ecotourism operations often install flush toilets that drain straight into rivers or into holes in the ground, where the water is intended to drain but cannot, since the soil is mostly impermeable clay. Coupled with the abundant local rainfall, these pits tend to fill very fast and overflow into the nearest streams. The streams get easily contaminated with fecal matter, as they are often quite small and there is not much dilution with clean river water. This leads to health hazards for the communities who use these rivers for drinking water, washing, swimming, and fishing.

=== Namibia ===
In Namibia a type of UDDT was developed which is locally called the "Otji toilet". This UDDT also uses the Coandă effect to divert the majority of the urine into a trough at the base of the pedestal and from there into an infiltration area. Between 2003 and 2011 about 1,200 Otji toilets have been installed in the south of Namibia and the rural areas around the Otjiwarongo District. Using the same design, the NGO EcoSur has built "Otji style" UDDTs in Ecuador and El Salvador since 2007, where they are called "Inodoro Seco".

=== Other countries ===
- The NGO Women in Europe for a Common Future (WECF) and local partners have built urine-diverting dry toilets for schools in Eastern Europe, Caucasus and Central Asia (EECCA region) in areas that lack a reliable water supply and waste management.
- In El Alto, Bolivia the NGO Fundación Sumaj Huasi has constructed nearly 1000 UDDTs for 4500 persons, and is carrying out communal composting for the excreta collected.

=== Boating, recreational vehicles and camping ===
A UDDT is an alternative to conventional toilets that store waste in blackwater tanks. Some such are marketed under the brand names "C-Head", "Compo Closet" "BoonJon", "Nature's Head" and "Air Head". Leave no trace is not only a philosophy but also a necessity in areas where human waste left behind will not decay naturally. Some models of UDDTs allow feces to be collected and packed out, leaving behind only the nearly pathogen-free urine.

== Society and culture ==
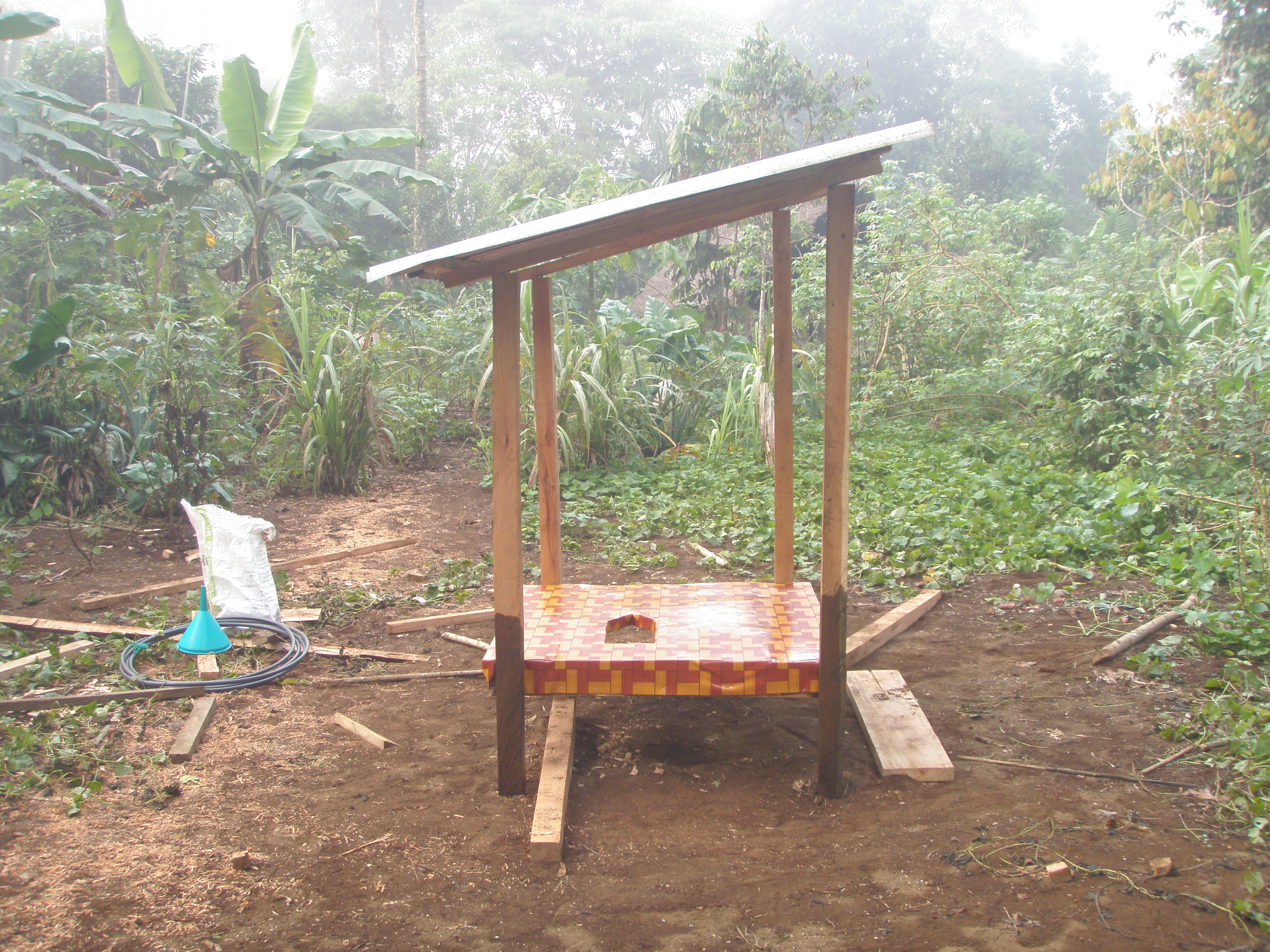
Floor and roof of a low-cost UDDT in Ecuador

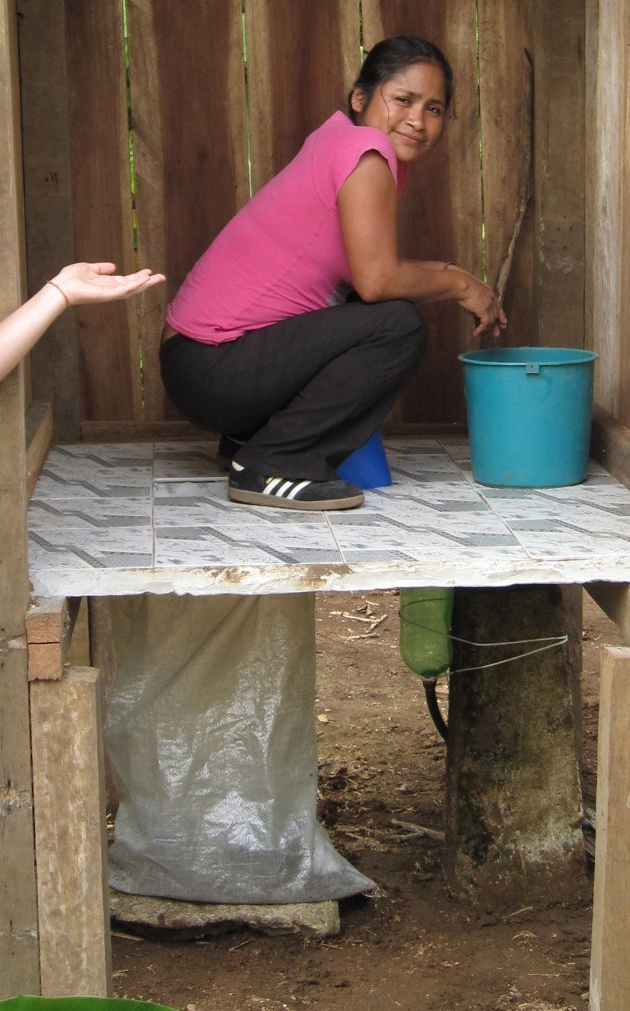
Demonstrating the use of a low-cost UDDT in Pumpuentsa, Ecuador.

=== General hurdles for acceptance ===
There are several barriers to a wider acceptance of this technology: the technology is not well known yet, buying UDDT components can be difficult, and in general it is difficult to finance sanitation services for the urban poor who rely on on-site sanitation. Existing, affordable piped water supply and sanitary sewer infrastructure may also be an impediment to widespread adoption of UDDTs, as their existence not only removes two of the main drivers for UDDTs but also represents a significant public investment.

Many users do not have an interest in handling their excreta, which can be another hurdle for acceptance of UDDTs. Provisions can be made to offer door-to-door/curbside collection of these materials, similar to how existing municipal or private schemes collect household organic waste (from kitchens and gardens, etc.) and transport these materials to a centralized facility for composting or biogas generation.

=== Number of users ===
The exact number of people using UDDTs worldwide is unknown, but a rough estimate by GIZ (German Development Cooperation) in 2012 based on known projects in 84 countries put the number at approximately 2 million people.

=== Regulations ===
==== Regulatory aspects in the U.S. ====
===== Use of dried feces =====
The International Association of Plumbing and Mechanical Officials (IAPMO), a plumbing and mechanical code structure currently utilized by many western states, has recently proposed an addition to its "Green Plumbing Mechanical Code Supplement" that "outlines performance criteria for site built composting toilets with and without urine diversion and manufactured composting toilets". If adopted, this new far reaching composting and urine diversion toilet code (the first of its kind in the United States) will appear in the 2015 edition of the Green Supplement to the Uniform Plumbing Code.

Several U.S. states currently permit disposal of feces from UDDTs or composting toilets (usually a clear distinction between different types of dry toilets is not made) by burial with some mandating lesser minimum depths, as little as 6 inches, and others not specifying any minimum depth at all. For instance:

- The Commonwealth of Massachusetts requires that "residuals from the [composting toilet] system must be buried on-site and covered with a minimum of six inches of clean compacted soil".
- In Oregon the applicable regulations state that "humus from composting toilets may be used around ornamental shrubs, flowers, trees, or fruit trees and shall be buried under at least twelve inches of soil cover".
- Rhode Island acknowledges that "solids produced by alternative toilets may be buried on site", but specifies that "residuals shall not be applied to food crops".
- The Department of Health of the Commonwealth of Virginia requires that "all materials removed from a composting privy shall be buried", and that "compost material shall not be placed in vegetable gardens or on the ground surface".
- The State of Vermont permits users to dispose of the byproducts via "shallow burial in a location approved by the Agency that meets the minimum site conditions [required of an onsite septic tank-based sanitation system]".
- The State of Washington takes a wholly different tack in choosing to model its extensive regulations that oversee the use of dry toilets (what it refers to as "waterless toilets") in large part on the federal regulations that govern sewage sludge.

For dry toilet users in the United States (which includes users of UDDTs), an important distinction to keep in mind—and one that is supported by the aforementioned existence of numerous state regulations which make no mention of, and also diverge widely from, the requirements of the federal regulations that govern the management of sewage sludge—is that as long as the excreta in question is not ever referred to as "fertilizer" (but instead simply a material that is being disposed of) the federal 503 rule, known colloquially as the "EPA Biosolids Rule" or the "EPA Sludge Rule", has no jurisdiction over the byproducts of a dry toilet and that all oversight of these materials falls to the individual states.

===== Use of urine =====
At present reuse of urine as a fertilizer in the United States is still in the conceptual phase. Studies into its feasibility are currently underway in Brattleboro, Vermont, and are being conducted by the not-for-profit Rich Earth Institute. Perhaps accordingly, a quick review of the pertinent regulations in existence in several different states turns up zero mentions of "urine diversion" and zero mentions of urine specifically as a standalone material which requires distinct oversight. Instead, when it is mentioned, it is always in conjunction with feces (as in the contents of a composting toilet or other non-source-separating dry toilet type. At least one state specifically regulates "liquids" produced but not recycled by a composting toilet (which could be construed as referring to urine) but the fact remains that none of the states surveyed distinctly uses the word "urine" when referring to "liquids". It is expected that as urine diverting toilets grow in popularity states will respond by amending their existing regulations to account for urine diverting toilets and also urine as a separate and distinct waste or resource stream.

Moreover, plans are currently underway to finalize a uniform plumbing code that would "represent the first codified requirements for the safe installation, maintenance and use for [composting and urine diversion toilets] in any installation".

== Gallery ==
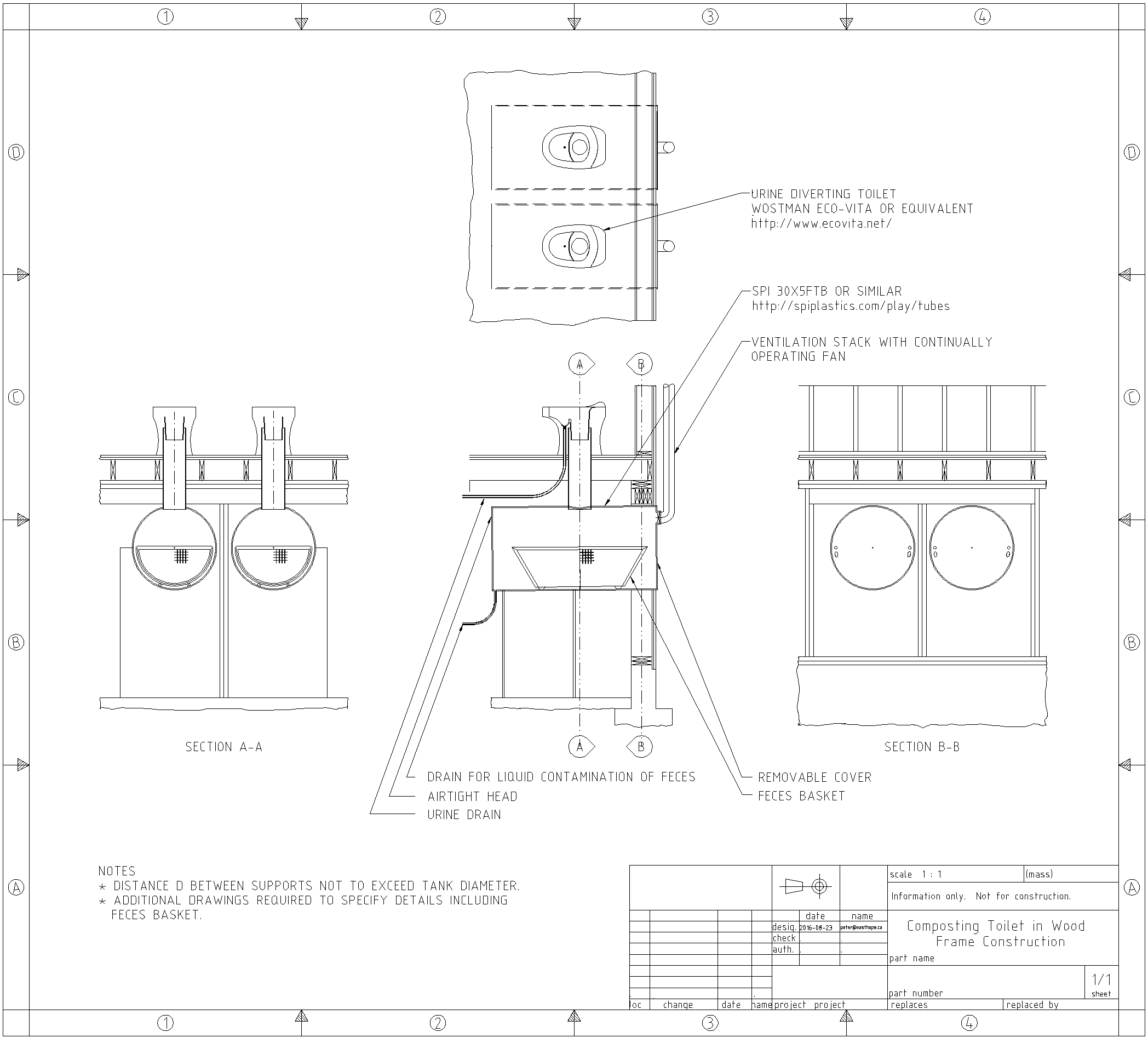
A urine-diverting toilet in a timber-frame structure

== See also ==
- Arborloo
- Container-based sanitation
- Peak phosphorus
- Portable toilet
- Sanitation
