= Rich Earth Institute =

Natural fertilizer company in Vermont, US

The Rich Earth Institute is a non-profit organization which is focused on turning human urine into fertilizer. It is headquartered in Brattleboro, Vermont. The institute processes about twelve thousand gallons of urine per year.

== See also ==
- Ecological sanitation
- Reuse of human excreta
- Urine-diverting dry toilet
