= Urine diversion =

Separate collection of human urine and feces at the point of their production

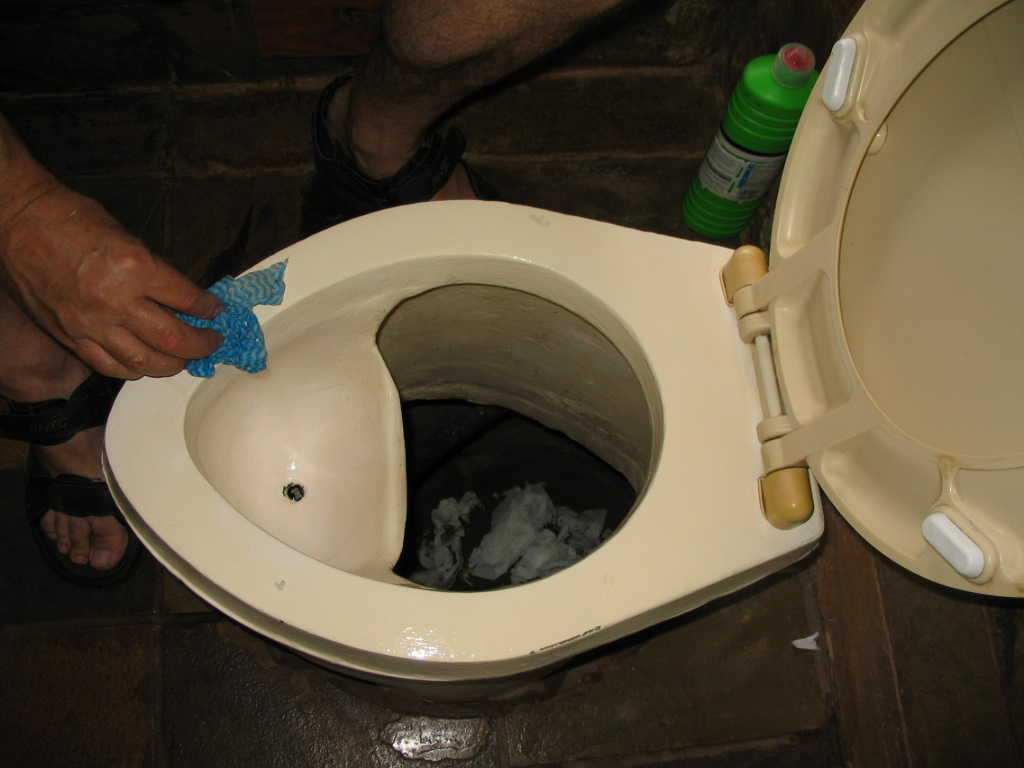
Cleaning a urine-diverting dry toilet (UDDT) in Johannesburg, South Africa

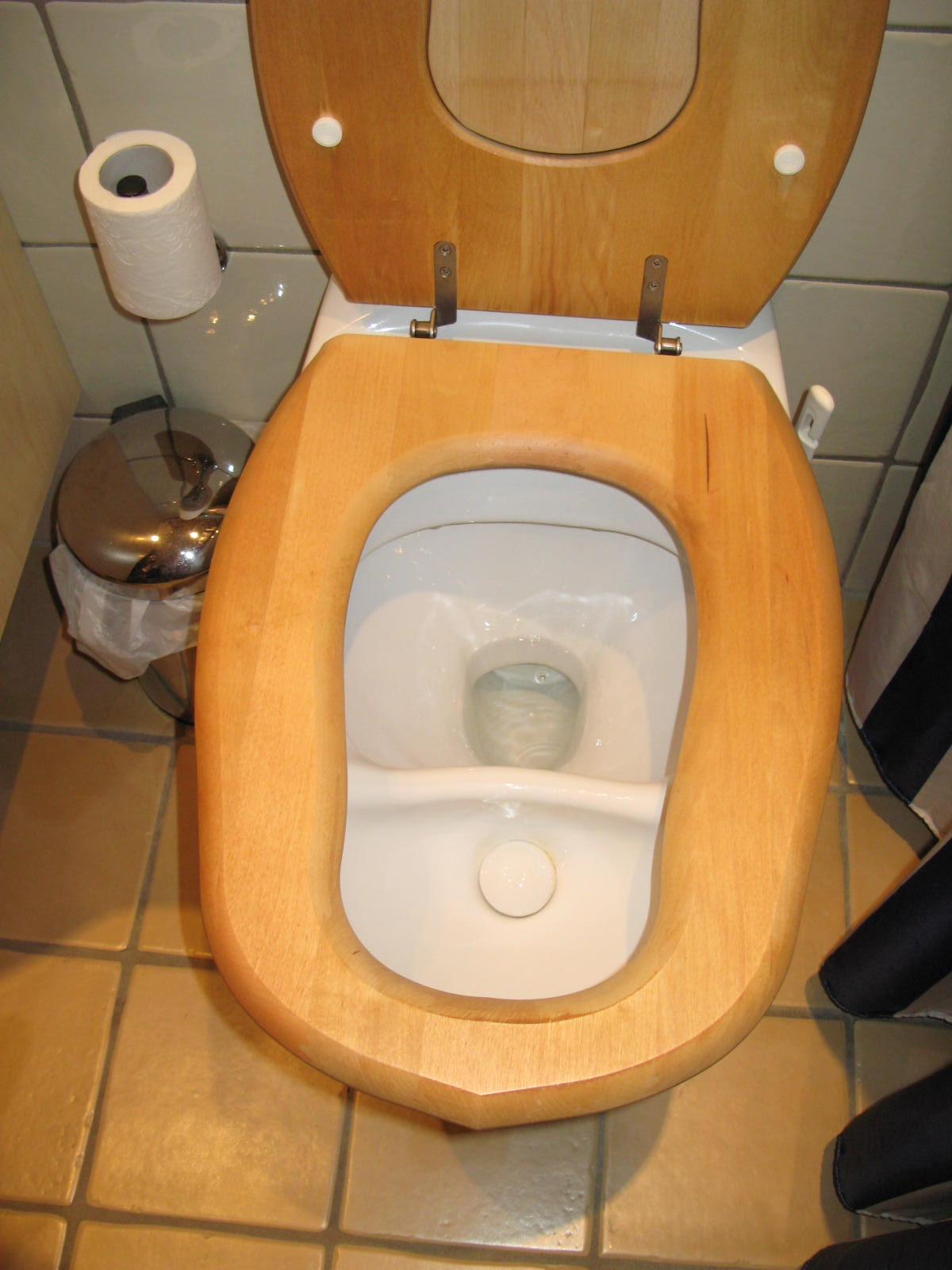
Urine diverting flush toilet at a household in Stockholm, Sweden (company: Dubbletten)

Urine diversion, also called urine separation or source separation, refers to the separate collection of human urine and feces at the point of their production, i.e. at the toilet or urinal. Separation of urine from feces allows human waste to be treated separately and used as a potential resource. Applications are typically found where connection to a sewer-based sanitation system is not available or areas where water supplies are limited.

To achieve urine diversion, the following technical components are used: waterless urinals, urine diversion toilets, urine piping to a urine storage tank (or to a sewer) and a reuse or treatment and disposal system for the urine. Urine diversion toilets may, or may not, mix water and feces, or some water and urine. They never mix urine and feces.

A toilet used to facilitate the separation of human waste products is called a urine diversion toilet or UDT. The bowl usually has two separate receptacles which may or may not be flushed with water. If flushed, the toilet is usually referred to as a urine-diversion flush toilet or UDFT. If not flushed, it is a dry toilet with either drying or composting for the feces. If the collected feces are dried, it is called a urine-diverting dry toilet or UDDT (also called urine-diversion dehydration toilet). If the collected feces are composted, it is called a urine-diverting composting toilet.

There are several commercially available urine diversion toilets (UDT) and urine diversion dry toilets (UDDT). Many look like a conventional sit-down or squat toilet and the bowl is divided into two sections, with the front section collecting urine and the rear section feces.

== Design considerations ==
=== Purpose ===
There are two main reasons why urine diversion is sensible which are relevant for all types of UD systems: Firstly, less water is used; secondly, the urine can be collected pure. It can then in a later step (after simple treatment, namely by storage) be used as fertilizer.

In addition, reasons for keeping urine and feces separate in a dry toilet compared to a pit latrine can be to:

- reduce odor (because mixing urine and feces together causes a lot of odor);
- avoid production of wet, odorous fecal sludge, which has to be removed by someone when the pit latrine is full;
- allow for the recovery of treated excreta so that it can be used as a fertilizer or soil enhancement.

=== Principle ===
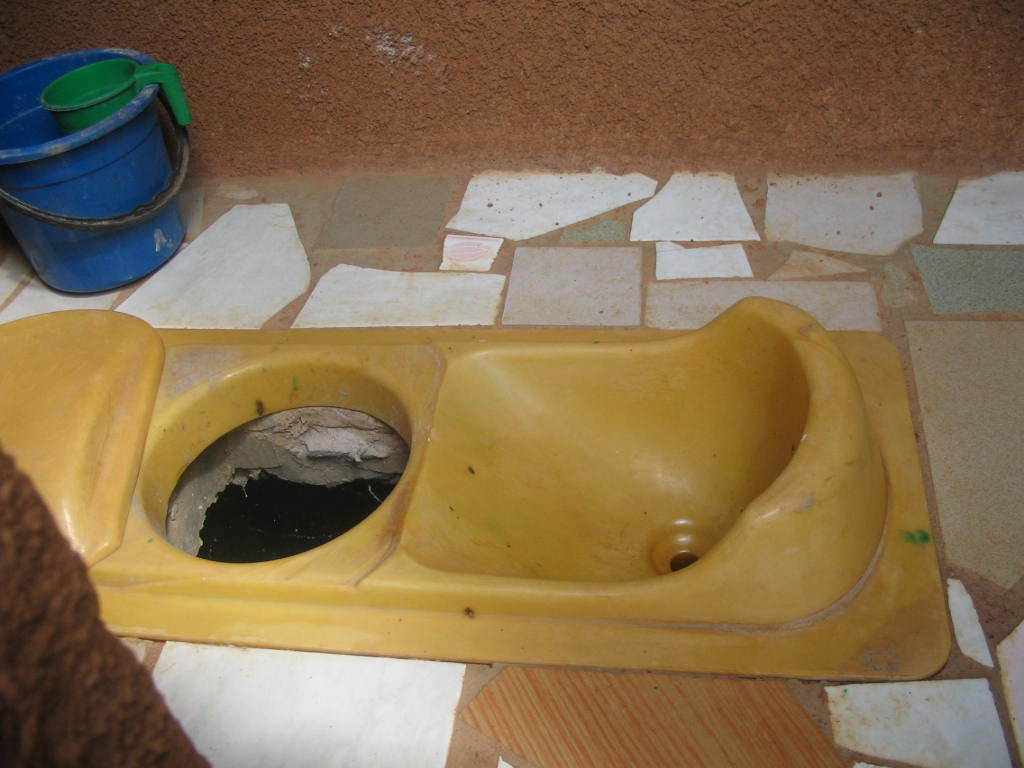
Squatting pan of urine-diverting dry toilet (UDDT) in Ouagadougou, Burkina Faso

Urine diversion takes advantage of the anatomy of the human body, which excretes urine and feces separately. In a UDDT, the urine is drained via a basin with a small hole near the front of the user interface, while feces fall through a larger drop-hole at the rear. This separate collection – or ‘source separation’ – does not require the user to change positions between urinating and defecating, although some care is needed to ensure the right position over the user interface.

Separate treatment of the two types of waste is justified since urine is nearly sterile and low in pathogens, provided an individual is healthy. This means that urine can be readily utilized as a fertilizer or discharged with less risk to community.

Human feces, on the other hand are high in pathogens, including up to 120 viruses and need to be treated well before it can be safely used in agriculture. The main two treatment methods are composting and drying. When feces are used without composting, it is called night soil, and is very smelly.

Ash and/or sawdust are usually added to the feces chamber of a UDDT to speed the composting process. Of the two, ash decreases microbial activity faster.

Whether the feces are handled on site or hauled to another location, the weight and volume of material is reduced by separating out urine. Additionally, treatment is simplified and faster. Urine diversion can also be used for composting toilets to reduce odor and reduce excessive moisture.

== Types of urine diversion devices ==
=== Urinals ===
Urine diversion toilet designs generally require men to sit or squat while urinating in order to avoid unhygienic splashing of urine. In cultures where males prefer to stand for urination, urinals are a good complementary solution. Urinals are commonly used in public toilets for male users. They collect urine separately from feces. So called "waterless urinals" use no water for flushing and therefore collect the urine undiluted. There are many suppliers for waterless urinals.

=== Urine-diversion flush toilets (UDFTs) ===
Urine diversion flush toilets have been manufactured in two main countries: Germany and Sweden. In Germany, the company Roediger Vacuum sold the "NoMix" toilet between 2003 - 2011. However, this toilet did not become a commercial success, and manufacturing, sales and technical support ceased in about 2010. Likewise, the Swedish company Gustavsberg stopped selling their urine diversion flush model in about 2011.

In Sweden, urine diversion flush toilets are still supplied by two manufacturers, Dubbletten and Wostman, which continue to sell their urine diversion systems today primarily for installation in summer houses in rural and semi-rural areas. These two types of urine diversion flush toilets have been installed in both research projects and community scale installations in Australia.

The design difference between the various models is the shape and size of the two compartments and in the way the flush water is introduced for the two compartments. In addition, the Roederig NoMix toilet was the only toilet that was able to collect the urine pure - without any flush water - due to a valve on the urine compartment that was opened when the user sat down and closed when the user stood up and flushed the toilet. It was also this valve that caused a lot of maintenance issues due to struvite precipitation in this valve. In the other urine diversion flush toilet models, the urine is diluted with a small amount of flush water, usually about one litre per flush.

== Disadvantages ==
It is unclear whether urine diversion (source separation) and on-site urine treatment can be made cost effective; nor whether required behavioral changes would be regarded as socially acceptable. There are some successful trials performed in Sweden.

Disadvantages and challenges with urine diversion systems include:

- Social acceptance amongst users
- User cooperation: urine diversion toilets need some upfront awareness-raising to ensure correct usage and social acceptance. Also, they are cleaned differently to conventional toilets.
- Urine reuse or disposal issues
- Urine precipitation in the urine diversion equipment due to struvite and calcium phosphate precipitates and resulting encrustations: this can be overcome with the right design and maintenance solutions.

== History ==
Historically, urine was collected (for example in chamber pots) and used for industrial processes, particularly fulling, an important step in textile manufacture.

Urine is also contains essential growth limiting plant nutrients: N:P:K = 11:2:4 and calcium 0.3.

== See also ==
- Reuse of excreta
- Ecological sanitation
