= WCF =

WCF may refer to:

== Organizations ==
- Washington Commonwealth Federation (1934–1948), a political organization in the American state of Washington
- Western Conference Finals (disambiguation), the finals of the western conference playoff in the NBA (National Basketball Association) or NHL (National Hockey League)
- World Capoeira Federation, an international organization for the sport of capoeira
- World Cat Federation, an international association of cat clubs
- World Cocoa Foundation
- World Congress of Families, a Christian conservative organization
- World Croquet Federation, and organization that encourages, promotes and develops the recognised versions of the game of croquet internationally
- World Curling Federation, the world governing body for curling accreditation, with offices in Perth, Scotland

== Information technology ==
- Windows Communication Foundation, a framework for building service-oriented application software.
  - WCF Data Services, a data service framework released as a complement to WCF.

== Other uses ==
- Waterloo – Cedar Falls metropolitan area, a statistical area in Iowa
- Westcliff railway station, Essex, England (National Rail station code WCF)
- Westminster Confession of Faith, a 1646 doctrinal statement from a branch of Protestant Christianity
- William Coles Finch, English author who signed his sketches "W.C.F."
- Winchester rifle, known as Winchester Center Fire
- World Cinema Fund, a fund associated with the Berlin International Film Festival which assists film projects in poorer countries
- World Cultural Festival, a festival held in New Delhi, India, in 2016
