= World Capoeira Federation =

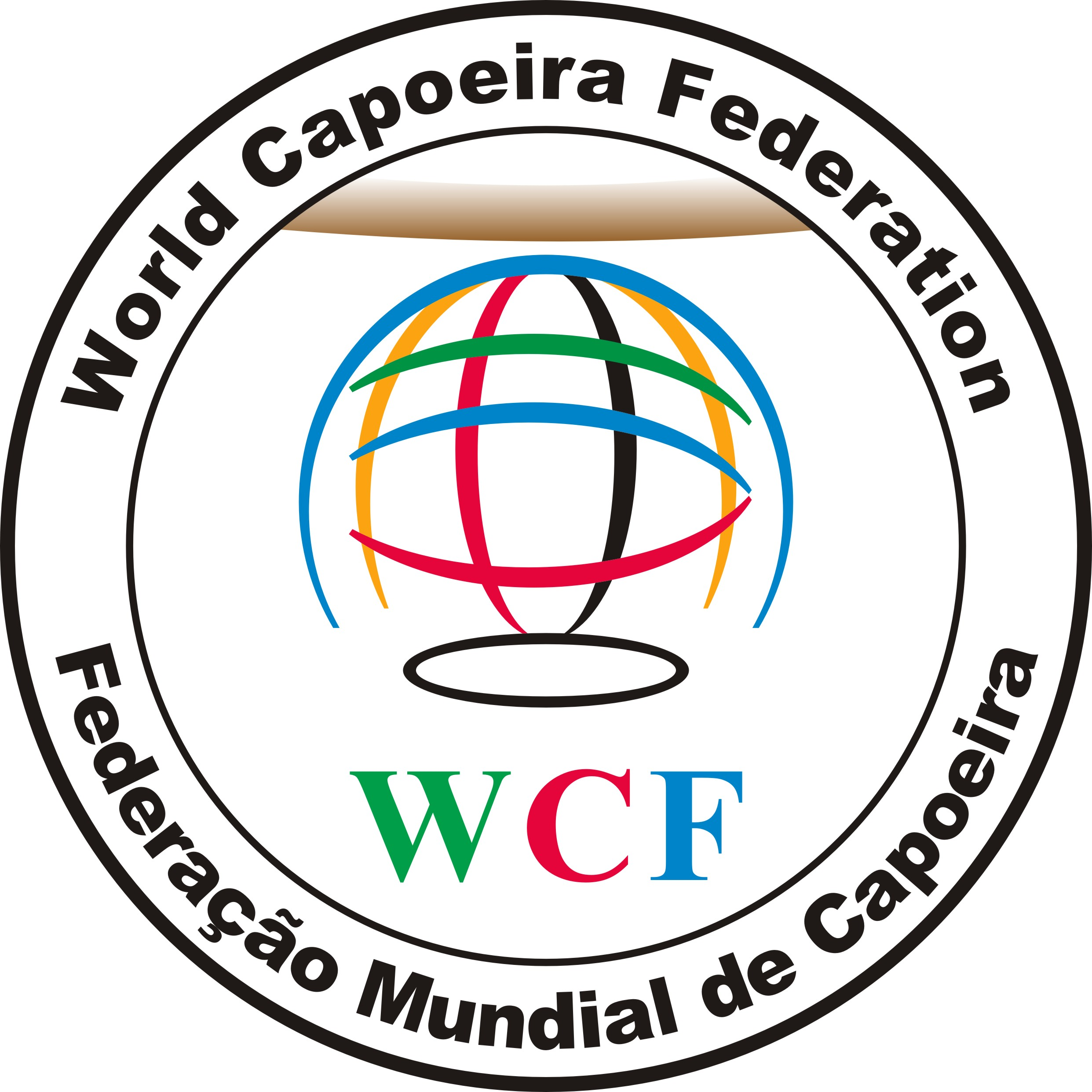
- Logo of WCF
- Established: 2011
- Legal status: International organization
- Purpose: Recognition of capoeira as a sport by the International Olympic Committee and gain entry for Capoeira in to the Olympics.
- Location: Tallinn, Estonia
- Members: Voluntary
- President: Paulo Sales Neto
- Main organ: General Conference
- Website: capoeira.ws

The World Capoeira Federation (WCF) is an international non-profit organisation whose main mission is to implement the systems and standards of sport capoeira with the view of getting capoeira into the Olympic Games.

The WCF recognises capoeira as a cultural heritage of Brazil the same as UNESCO, who declared capoeira and the capoeira circle an intangible cultural heritage of humanity in 2014.

The rules and points systems of sport capoeira have been compiled under the guidance of many of the world's masters including Mestre Paulão Ceará, Mestre Itapoan, Mestre Boneco, Mestre Hulk, Mestre Peixe Ensaboado. They have helped create a game that is consistent with Olympic standards that also maintains the fundamentals of interaction, variety, and precision of movements for which capoeira is traditionally known.

Today the WCF is the only international organisation representing sport capoeira and the standardisations of sports norms as applied to this form of competition capoeira. The WCF organises competition worldwide as well as facilitating capoeira coaching courses, referee qualification courses, and other sport capoeira-related activities.

== History ==
The idea to establish an international federation was first introduced in Azerbaijan during the 3rd World Forum on Capoeira on June 18, 2011. By October 2011, under the authorship of Jamil Huseynov, the World Capoeira Federation was founded and registered (registration code: 80334399). in Tallinn, Estonia, where the headquarters of the organisation is currently located.

The main aim of the project was to bring together various Capoeira organisations from around the world to form a single international organisation. Since its establishment, the WCF has organised and assisted in organising a number of world championships and international competitions open for all players from all groups to participate. It is in these events that sport competition norms and standards were applied to Capoeira and thus gave birth to Sport Capoeira.

== Mission and goals ==
=== Mission ===
To welcome all players of Capoeira to join together for international competition.

=== Goals ===
- To promote Sport Capoeira worldwide with the view of being included in the Olympic Games.
- To create sports structure and standards for Capoeira.
- To develop friendly relationships with national federations around the world.
- To be inclusive of all Capoeira groups and schools in major competitions.
- To co-operate with major sporting organisations including the International Olympic Committee and others.
- To popularise Capoeira together with national federations, groups, schools, clubs and individuals.
- To train highly qualified athletes, coaches, referees and other specialists to Sport Capoeira.
- To comply with the requirements of the Olympic Charter, International Conventions, Olympic Movement Medical Code and World Anti-doping Code and follow them strictly.
- To defend the interests and rights of athletes, coaches, referees and other specialists to Sport Capoeira.

== Basic structure of competitions ==
- Competitions are conducted based on the “Regional” style.
- In all rounds, adults compete twice for 90 seconds (two games of 45 seconds) in order to define the winner to progress to the next round.
- If results of the 1st and 2nd game are equal, competitors compete in a 3rd game for 30 seconds.
- Only movements from the official Permitted Movements list may be performed in a competition. The performance of the movements that have not been listed will not be considered.
- Movements and behaviour detailed in the Illegal Movements & Behaviour List will result in a penalty or disqualification from the competition.
- No movement if technically correct will be scored if it is done outside of the Roda line. However. If one of the competitors delivers an effective technique to his opponent while still inside the competition area the technique will be scored.
- Non-injurious, light, controlled touch contact to the body and head is allowed (but neither to the face nor the throat). A correctly performed technique to the body or head will be considered a score at a distance up to 30 cm.
- Competitors must heed the direction, warnings and decisions of the Roda Referee during games and must be able to recognise the Referee Gestures and their meanings.

== Categories of Competition ==
Category	Gender	Age (years )	Weight (kg)
Children 1	Female Male	10 - 11 10 - 11	-
Children 2	Female Male	12 - 13 12 - 13	-
Juniors 1	Female Male	14 - 15 14 - 15	-
Juniors 2	Female Male	16 - 17 16 - 17	-
Seniors	Female	18+	up to 53 kg
Seniors	Female	18+	53 – 60 kg
Seniors	Female	18+	more than 60 kg
Seniors	Male	18+	up to 64 kg
Seniors	Male	18+	64 –70 kg
Seniors	Male	18+	70 – 76 kg
Seniors	Male	18+	76 – 82 kg
Seniors	Male	18+	more than 82 kg

== Types of competition ==
World Championships – An international competition for all countries in the world open to elite athletes representing their country.

Continental Championship – An international competition for all countries with a continent open to elite athletes representing their country.

Multi-sport Games – An international competition for all countries in the world open to elite athletes representing their country within the confides of a larger multiple sports event, i.e. Olympic Games.

Premier Tournament – An international competition with a high level of exposure and publicity open to all athletes who are members of the WCF without limit.

International Open Tournaments – An international competition open to all athletes who are members of the WCF without limit. Usually hosted annually in a specific country by the national federation.

== Ranking ==
Every Athlete who participates in a WCF organised or sanctioned competition will score points toward their world ranking in Sport Capoeira.

Athletes who participate in more events and who also perform well in those events will be awarded more points over the year. At the end of every year the WCF awards the top athletes.

== Documents of the WCF ==
Rules of Competition - 2018

Rules of Ranking - 2018

International Referee Course and Exam - 2020

Organising International Competitions - 2020

== Membership ==
Individual Members – Any person can register as an Individual Member of the WCF if in his country there is no National Federation and if his own Capoeira Group, school or club is not an Associate Member of the WCF

Full Members – These are National Federations that represent each country around the world. Each National Federation that is a Full Member of the WCF is supplied with 50 complimentary memberships for their members each year. Only one Federation from each country will be recognised and granted Full Membership by the WCF.

Associate Members – Associate Members are Capoeira groups, schools, and clubs from countries that do not have a representing National Federation.

Honorary Member – Athletes, coaches, and other members of the WCF or any individual who has significantly contributed to the development of the WCF may be granted an Honorary Membership.

== Full Member National Federations ==
As of January 1, 2020, the current Full Members are national Federations of:

- Australia - Australian Sport Capoeira Federation
- Azerbaijan
- Benin
- Estonia
- Hong Kong - The Capoeira Federation of Hong Kong, China
- Iran
- Pakistan
- Russia
- Sweden

== Main bodies of the WCF ==
General Conference is a Supreme Body of WCF. The General Conference consists of Full members of WCF. Full members of WCF are National and Continental Capoeira Federations (Associations).

A General Conference meeting is held at least once per year. The General Conference may adopt any decision related to the WCF’s activity that is not contradicting with demands of the statutes of the WCF.

Management Board is a head executive body of the WCF and is one of the principal bodies leading current activity of the WCF during a General inter-Conference period. The Management Board consists of 12 members who are individuals. Decisions of the Management Board are made with the ordinary majority of votes in an open voting manner.

Supervisory commission is one of the principal bodies of WCF which conducts inspection and control activity for the WCF. The commission consists of a Chairman and five members who are individuals. The Supervisory commission reviews written applications submitted by organisations and members of the WCF within the month and responds accordingly.

Council of Masters is one of the principal bodies, which recognises capoeira masters around the world and documents their careers. The council also assists in preparing technical standards and the procedural rules of capoeira within the WCF.

== Leadership ==
- President — (Brazil) Paulo Sales Neto
- 1st Vice president — (Azerbaijan) Nahid Aghazada
- Vice president — (Spain) Flavio Oliveira Da Silva Dhein
- Secretary General — (Azerbaijan) Jamil Huseyn
- Chairman Council of Masters — (Brazil) Jean Adriano Barros da Silva
- Chairman of Education Commission — (Australia) Andre Cerutti
- Chairman of Referee Commission — (Hong Kong) Daniel Hemsworth
- Member of the Board — (Estonia) Ramid Niftalijev
- Member of the Board — (United States) Yoji Senna
- Member of the Board — (Azerbaijan) Elgiz Alizada
