= Vision IPTV =

Internet TV company

Vision IPTV is an internet TV and IPTV company located in London. The business offers a white label, broadcast standard, over-the-top internet TV platform service, based on the server technology developed by sister company Playout247, which provides satellite playout services which deliver channels to SKY and other satellite operators. Vision IPTV is based in central London. In February 2011, Vision IPTV opened an office in Dubai.

Vision provides the equipment and services required to receive, ingest, transcode, edit, store, manage and play out to the internet. Vision also owns its own content delivery network CDN.

== Features ==
Vision IPTV provides a range of features including scheduled broadcast playout, satellite turnaround, digital rights management, and various streaming and distribution capabilities

== IPTV Platform ==
The company has developed an IPTV platform that supports various content delivery protocols and codecs, including HTTP WMV Silverlight, RTSP WMV Silverlight.

The media library accommodates traditional broadcast requirements with features such as MRSS metadata implementation, broadcast playlists, EPG RSS feeds, and adjustable per-item pricing and security. For content security, the platform uses measures like whitelisting, session ID, HMAC DRM, and geo IP-based restrictions. The platform has a subscriber registration system with options for email confirmation and user profile management. It supports multiple payment gateways such as WorldPay, Click and Buy, Cash U, and PayPal, with various billing options.

== History ==
Incorporated in 2006, Vision IPTV was founded by John Mills and Matjaž Vidmar. John Mills was formerly the Commercial Director at IPTV operator, Homechoice, now branded TalkTalk TV.

The company is part of a group of companies, Vision Holding, that comprises Vision IPTV, Playout247 and Soho Data. The Company is privately owned.

In September 2010, Vision IPTV and sister company Playout247 reported a revenue growth of 40% and began an investment programme. The investment was reported to cover a doubling in satellite playout capacity and increased demand for their Internet TV services. Later in the same month Vision IPTV launched their IPTV platform at MIPCOM in France. The company shortly thereafter announced it has won the Renault TV account with Publicis Media.

In late October, Vision IPTV announced the launch of Racing UK on IPTV. The solution enables Racing UK to offer their channel to non SKY subscribers via a set top box.

In early 2011, following the announcement of plans by the UK Culture Secretary for the establishment of a local TV channel, Vision IPTV called on the UK Culture Secretary to have the new channel distributed via broadband Internet rather than the digital terrestrial TV network as the lower distribution costs would make it easier for local broadcasters to participate.

At the end of January 2011, Vision IPTV expanded its operation into the UAE with the announcement that it was opening an office in Dubai, and this was to be launched at CABSAT MENA in February 2011.

== Customers ==
Customers include Russia Today, Publicis Media, Racing UK, and VX TV.

== Press ==
- 12 April 2010, Darim UK, a joint venture between innovative IPTV company Vision IPTV and broadcast technology experts Darim, showcased their portable 3D studio webcasting and video on demand.
- 16 September 2010 (Close-Up Media via Comtex) – Sister companies Playout247 and Vision IPTV announced the beginning of an investment program in studio and broadcast technology supported by capacity increases.
- 4–8 October 2010: Vision IPTV’s Internet TV platform launched at MIPCOM 2010 (Cannes, France)
- 10 January 2011. Soho Data Holdings, sister company to Vision IPTV and Playout247, signed a £10m agreement with Xiking Culture Media (Beijing), to establish a data centre and render farm, aimed at the creative video and TV industries.
- 20 January 2011. Vision IPTV called on Culture Secretary Jeremy Hunt to back broadcast quality Internet-only distribution and playout for the new national TV channel.
- 31 January 2011.At CABSAT MENA 2011, Vision IPTV launched a commercial and technical hub in Dubai, UAE, to support customer expansion throughout the Middle East, West Asia and Africa regions.
