= Usual offices =

The usual offices is a former euphemism which may refer to either:

- bathrooms or toilets as places of urination and defecation
- outhouses and other pit toilets.
