= Toilet paper orientation =

Direction of mounting a toilet paper roll

Toilet paper orientation

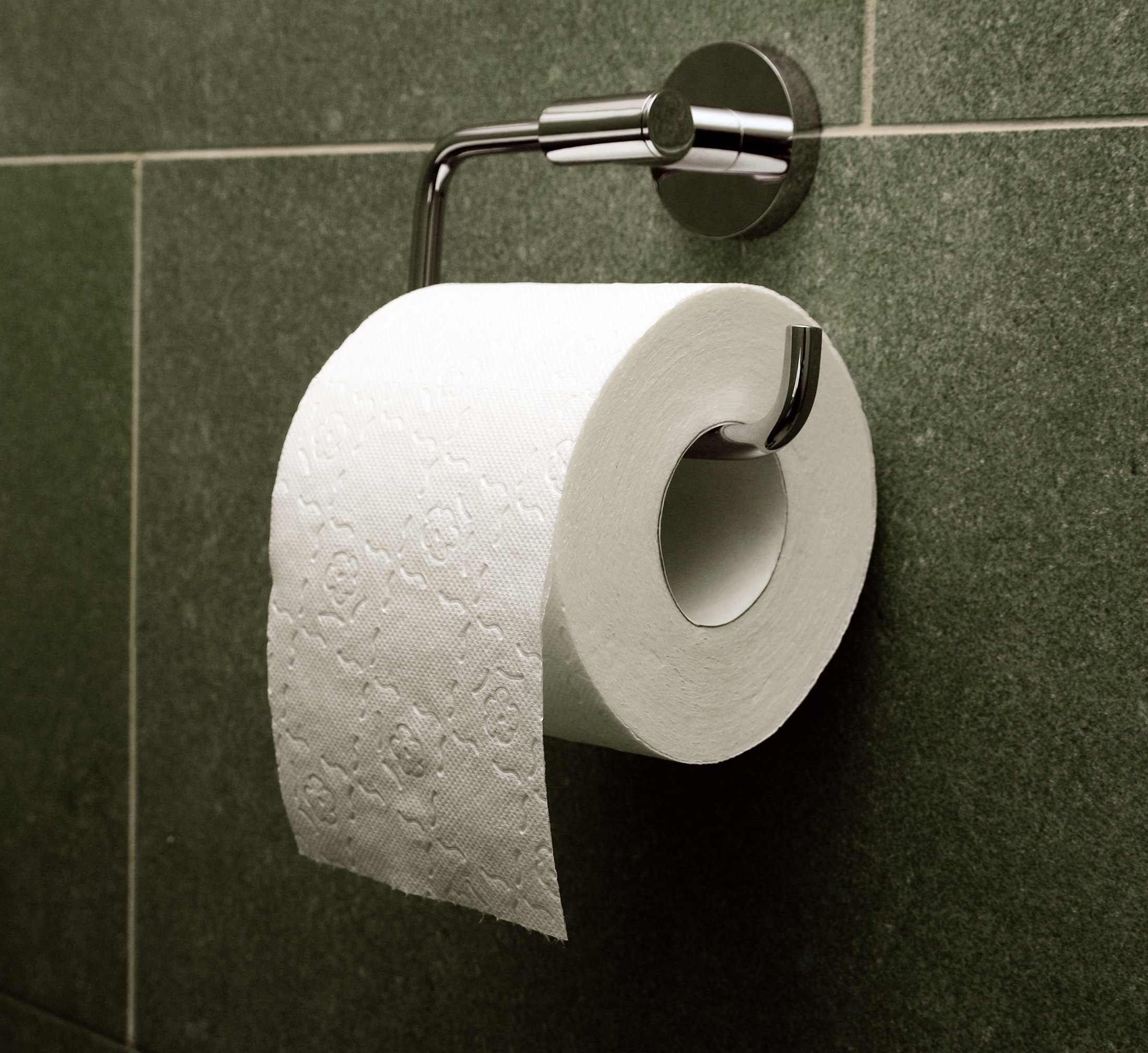
The over orientation

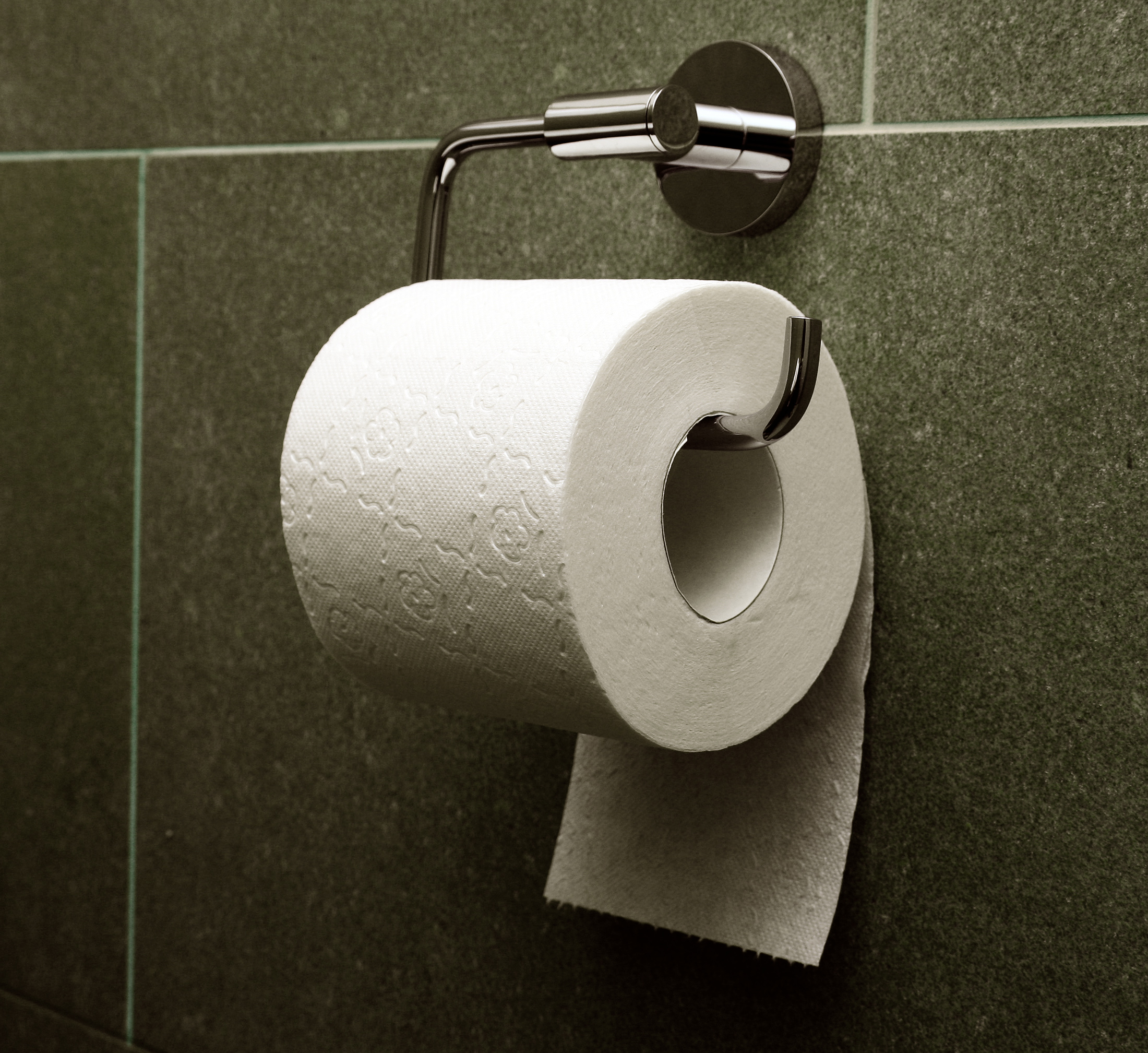
The under orientation

Some toilet roll holders or dispensers allow the toilet paper to hang in front of (over) or behind (under) the roll when it is placed parallel to the wall. This divides opinions about which orientation is better. Arguments range from aesthetics, hospitality, ease of access, and cleanliness, to paper conservation, ease of detaching sheets, and compatibility with pets.

This issue was the topic of a 1977 Ask Ann Landers column, where it was occasionally reconsidered and often mentioned. In a 1986 speech, Landers claimed it was the most popular column, attracting 15,000 letters.

The case study of "toilet paper orientation" has been used as a teaching tool in instructing sociology students in the practice of social constructionism.

== History ==
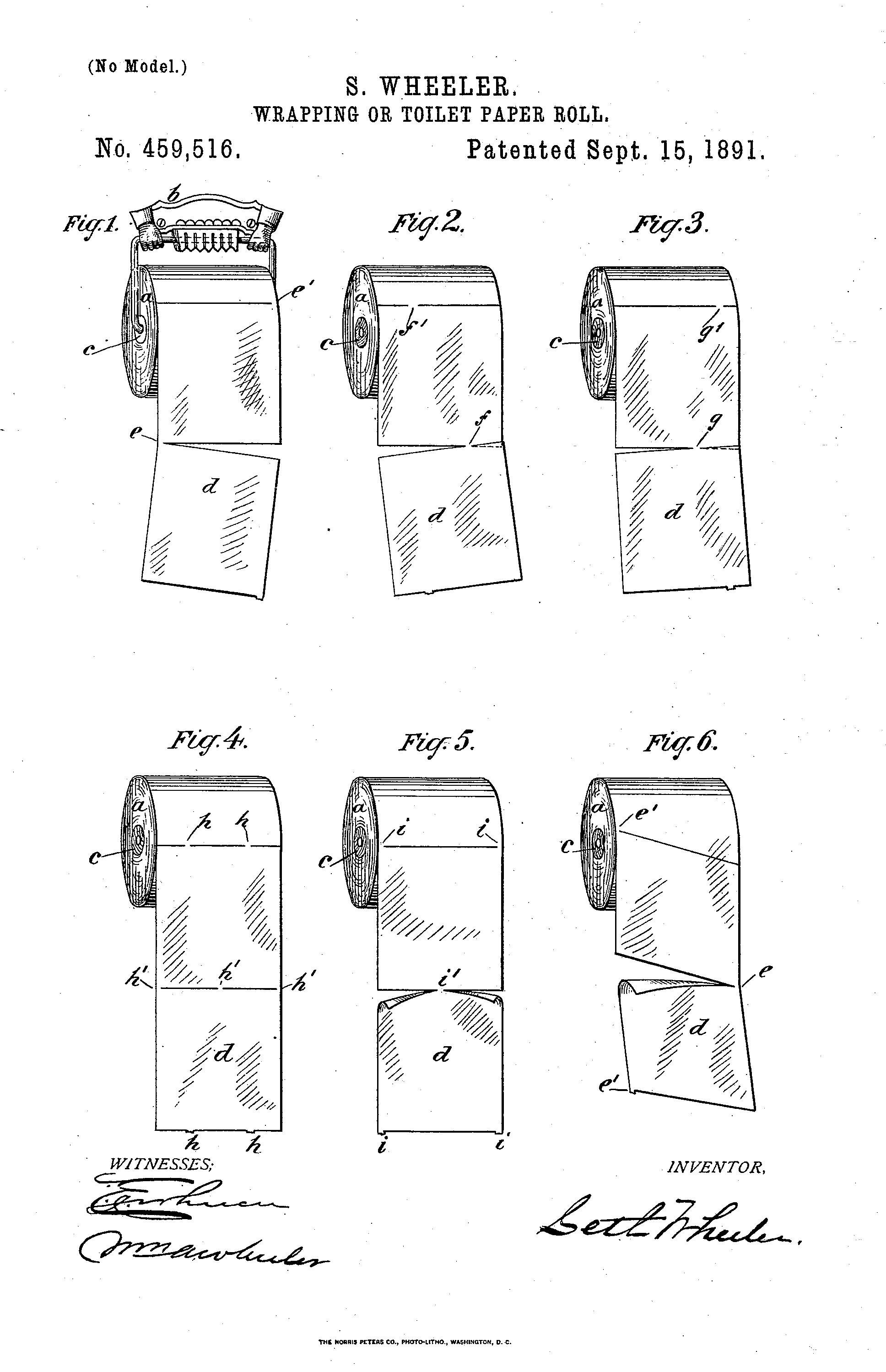
Illustration from Seth Wheeler's 1891 patent, showing the roll oriented as "over".

Seth Wheeler patented several toilet paper holders in the late 19th century. In many of these patents the toilet paper is shown hanging in the over orientation, although at least one uses the under position.

== Arguments ==
The main reasons given by people to explain why they hang their toilet paper a given way are ease of grabbing and habit.

The over position reduces the risk of accidentally brushing the wall or cabinet with one's knuckles, potentially transferring grime and germs; makes it easier to visually locate and to grasp the loose end; gives the option to fold over the last sheet to show that the room has been cleaned; and is generally the intended direction of viewing for the manufacturer's branding, so patterned toilet paper looks better this way.

The under position provides a more tidy appearance, in that the loose end can be more hidden from view; reduces the risk of a toddler or a house pet such as a cat unrolling the toilet paper when batting at the roll; and in a recreational vehicle may reduce unrolling during driving.

Partisans have claimed that each method makes it easier to tear the toilet paper on a perforated sheet boundary.

Various toilet paper dispensers are available which avoid the question of over or under orientation; for example, single sheet dispensers, jumbo roll dispensers in which the toilet roll is perpendicular to the wall, and twin roll dispensers. Swivelling toilet paper dispensers have been developed which allow the paper to be unrolled in either direction.

=== Public opinion ===
In various surveys, around 70% of people prefer the over position. (Note: Surveys:) Based on a survey of 1,000 Americans, Kimberly-Clark (Cottonelle) reported that "overs" are more likely than "unders" to notice a roll's direction (~75 percent), to be annoyed when the direction is "incorrect" (~25 percent), and to have flipped the direction at a friend's home (~30 percent). The same claim is made by James Buckley's The Bathroom Companion for people older than 50. Toilet paper orientation is sometimes mentioned as a hurdle for married couples. The issue may also arise in businesses and public places. At the Amundsen–Scott Research Station at the South Pole, complaints have been raised over which way to install toilet paper. It is unclear if one orientation is more economical than the other. The Orange County Register attributes to Planet Green a claim that over saves on paper usage.

== Uses in social studies ==
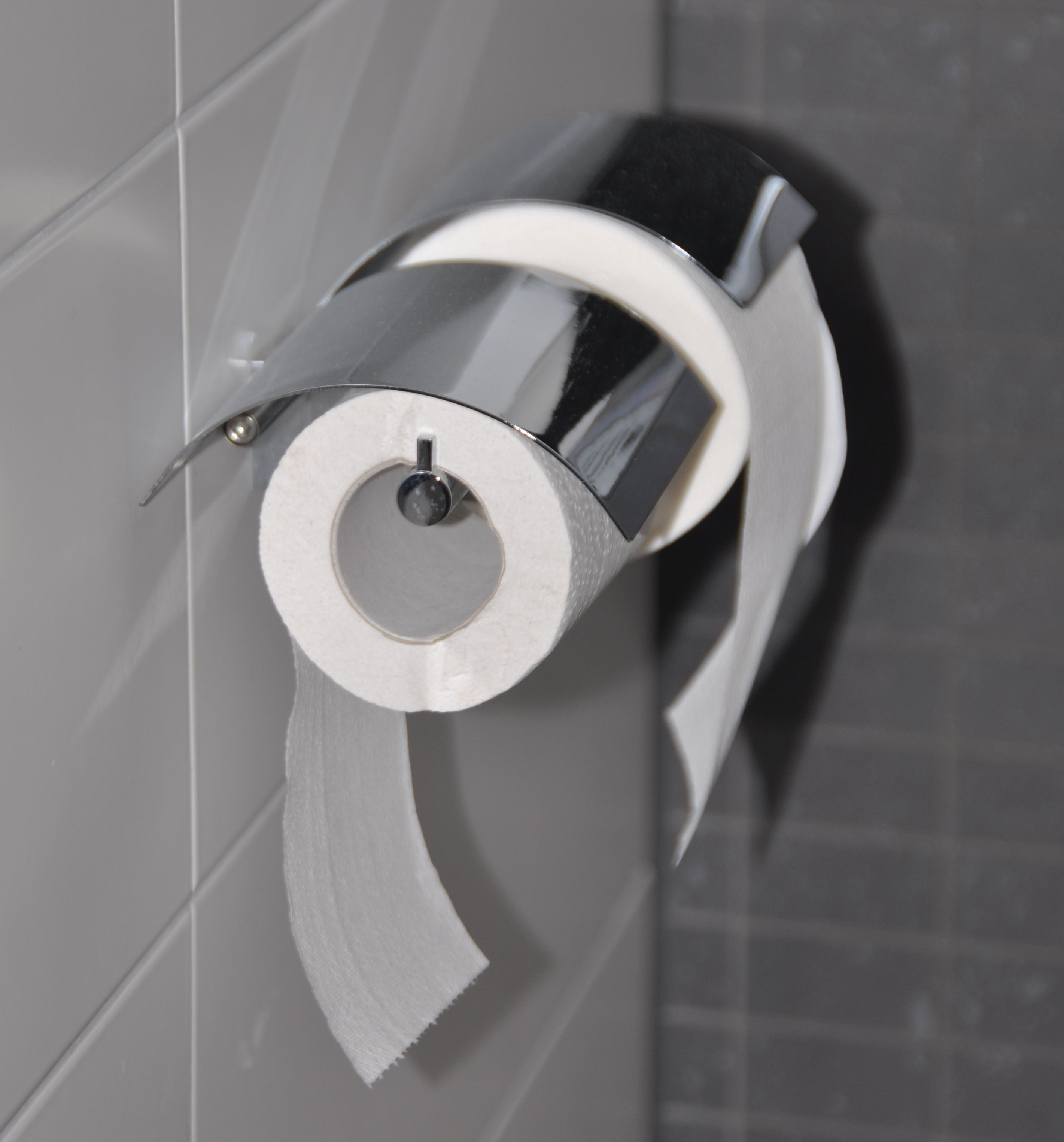
Two paper holders side by side, each with different orientation

The case study of "toilet paper orientation" is an important teaching tool in instructing sociology students in the practice of social constructionism.

In the article "Bathroom Politics: Introducing Students to Sociological Thinking from the Bottom Up", Eastern Institute of Technology sociology professor Edgar Alan Burns describes some reasons toilet paper politics is worthy of examination. On the first day of Burns' introductory course in sociology, he asks his students, "Which way do you think a roll of toilet paper should hang?" In the following fifty minutes, the students examine why they picked their answers, exploring the social construction of "rules and practices which they have never consciously thought about before". Burns' activity has been adopted by a social psychology course at the University of Notre Dame, where it is used to illustrate the principles of Berger and Luckmann's 1966 classic The Social Construction of Reality.

Christopher Peterson, a professor of psychology at the University of Michigan, classifies the choice of toilet paper orientation under "tastes, preferences, and interests" as opposed to either values or "attitudes, traits, norms, and needs". Other personal interests include one's favorite cola or baseball team. Interests are an important part of identity; one expects and prefers that different people have different interests, which serves one's "sense of uniqueness".

Differences in interests usually lead at most to teasing and gentle chiding. For most people, interests do not cause the serious divisions caused by conflicts of values; a possible exception is what Peterson calls "the 'get a life' folks among us" who elevate interests into moral issues.

Morton Ann Gernsbacher, a professor of psychology at the University of Wisconsin–Madison, compares the orientation of toilet paper to the orientation of cutlery in a dishwasher, the choice of which drawer in a chest of drawers to place one's socks in, and the order of shampooing one's hair and lathering one's body in the shower. In each choice, there is a prototypical solution chosen by the majority, and it is tempting to offer simplistic explanations of how the minority must be different. She warns that neuroimaging experiments—which as of 2007 were beginning to probe behaviors from mental rotation and facial expressions to grocery shopping and tickling—must strive to avoid such cultural bias and stereotypes.

In his book Conversational Capital, Bertrand Cesvet gives toilet paper placement as an example of ritualized behavior—one of the ways designers and marketers can create a memorable experience around a product that leads to word-of-mouth momentum. Cesvet's other examples include shaking a box of Tic Tacs and dissecting Oreo cookies.

== In popular culture ==
In a 1980s episode of the Oprah Winfrey talk show, Winfrey said she was "an over girl", and when she asked the audience their preference, the 32% who favored the "under" configuration were booed.

In 2016, relationship expert Gilda Carle created a "Toilet Paper Personality Test", surveying 2000 people on their roll preference and asking how assertive they considered themselves to be in relationships. She concluded that "people who roll over are more dominant than those who roll under".

== Bibliography ==
- Landers, Ann (15 July 1977), "Ann Landers", Boston Globe, pp. b4
- Landers, Ann (26 September 1977), "A flimsy issue", Boston Globe, p. 17
- Landers, Ann (11 October 1977), The heroines of the household
- Landers, Ann (19 November 1989), "Toilet paper debate gets rolling again", Chicago Tribune
- Landers, Ann (24 April 1992), "Toilet tissue issue refuses to roll over", Chicago Tribune
- Star, The Toronto (19 November 1986), "Hang toilet paper over top of roll, Ann Landers says", The Toronto Star, pp. a4
- "American Standard Bathroom Habits Survey Shows We're Multitasking, Even in the Bath (press release)". American Standard Press. 20 August 2008. Archived from the original on 23 August 2016.
- Barrett, Erin; Mingo, Jack, eds. (December 2003). W. C. Privy's Original Bathroom Companion, Number 2. St. Martin's Press. ISBN 0-312-31580-5.
- Buckley, James (2005). The Bathroom Companion: A Collection of Facts About the Most-Used Room in the House. Quirk Books. ISBN 1-59474-028-3.
- Burns, Edgar Alan (January 2003). "Bathroom Politics: Introducing Students to Sociological Thinking from the Bottom Up". Teaching Sociology. 31 (1): 110–118. doi:10.2307/3211429. JSTOR 3211429.
- Carpenter, Richard P. (28 March 1999). "It's swimming vs. snoozing". The Boston Globe. p. M4. Factiva bstngb0020010825dv3s00asy.
- Cesvet, Bertrand; Babinski, Tony; Alper, Eric (2008). Conversational Capital: How to Create Stuff People Love to Talk About. Pearson Education. ISBN 978-0-13-714550-8.
- Collett, Jessica (Spring 2008), "Class 4: Social Construction of Reality", Notre Dame OpenCourseWare, archived from the original on 29 June 2010
- "At long last, I can escape from my Polar prison", Daily Express, pp. 38–39, 14 October 1999, Factiva theexp0020010826dvae0066w
- Darbo, Paul (April 2007), "This Way In: The Sound and the Fury: ELSEWHERE IN THE BIN (letters to the editor)", Esquire, vol. 147, p. 22
- Ebenkamp, Becky (19 January 2004), "Out of the Box", Brandweek, Factiva ADMW000020040202e01j0002m
- Elliott, Carson (11 June 2006). "The proper thing: Position plates so that meat is closest to diner, unless dishes display pictures". Augusta Chronicle. p. G02. Factiva AGCR000020060809e26b00004.
- Floyd, Jacquielynn (29 June 1999). "Inventor rolls out solution to toilet paper war". The Dallas Morning News. p. 15A. Factiva dal0000020010829dv6t005qf.
- Garton, Nicole (8 January 2005). "Over or under? The great toilet paper debate continues". Tulsa World. p. D10. Factiva TUL0000020050111e1180000y.
- Gernsbacher, Morton Ann (March 2007), "Presidential Column: Neural Diversity", Observer, vol. 20, no. 3, Association for Psychological Science, pp. 5, 15
- Grant, Michael (16 July 1991). "Paper chase unravels at 30,000 feet". The San Diego Union-Tribune. p. C-1. Factiva SDU0000020070627dn7g002uk.
- Grant, Michael (1 September 1991). "Toilet paper theorist is on a roll, but issue is still under scrutiny". The San Diego Union-Tribune. p. D-1. Factiva SDU0000020070627dn91007fo.
- Henry, Bonnie (1 August 1999). "The key role of toilet paper has columnist's eyes rolling". The Arizona Daily Star. p. 3E. Factiva tucs000020010830dv81006wg.
- Jarski, Rosemarie; Jarski, Milena (2007). How to Do Everything!. Globe Pequot. p. 143. ISBN 978-1-84537-415-0.
- Hogan, Eve Eschner; Hogan, Steve (2000). Intellectual Foreplay: Questions for Lovers and Lovers-To-Be. Hunter House.
- Kanner, Bernice (15 September 1995). Are You Normal?: Do You Behave Like Everyone Else?. St. Martin's Paperbacks. ISBN 0-312-95592-8.
- Keeran, James (30 December 1993), "Professor Jaggi // Rocket Scientist", The Pantagraph, p. C1, Factiva blm0000020011031dpcu00n58
- Lind, Angus (17 July 1992). "In a spin over tissue issue". Times-Picayune. p. E1. Factiva notp000020011107do7h00dum.
- Lui, John (13 April 2009). "Hip night owl". The Straits Times. Factiva STIMES0020090412e54d00022.
- McNatt, Cindy (22 April 2010), "Easy ways to go green for Earth Day", The Orange County Register, Factiva OCR0000020100503e64p0002t, "Planet Green says that if you hang your toilet paper roll so the paper comes out over the top, not from under, you'll save on toilet paper."
- Mitchell, Kathy; Sugar, Marcy (2005). "Friend's abuse should be reported". Annie's Mailbox. p. 6 – via Vernon Daily Record.
- Nerbas, Reena (4 October 2009). "Pesky glue: Peanut butter to the rescue". Winnipeg Free Press. p. D2. Factiva WFP0000020091004e5a40000h.
- O'Connor, David (2 May 2005). Henderson's House Rules: The Official Guide to Replacing the Toilet Paper and Other Domestic Topics of Great Dispute. East Quincy Publishing. ISBN 0-9764078-0-9.
- Ode, Kim (16 March 2010). "psst...". Star-Tribune. p. 1E. Factiva MSP0000020100322e63g0006s.
- Pierson, Amy (13 January 2004), "Dick Clark Helps Usher in a New Year of Softness (press release)", Market Wire, Factiva ITWR000020040113e01d00001
- Peterson, Christopher (2006), A Primer in Positive Psychology, Oxford: Oxford University Press
- "Cottonelle on a Roll With Consumers". Progressive Grocer. 31 January 2010. Factiva PRGR000020100202e61v0000s.
- Rosencrans, Joyce (7 November 1998), "To fold or not to fold/ guest-bathroom tissue", The Cincinnati Post, p. 1C, Factiva cinp000020010916dub700mw1
- Rubin, Neal (28 September 1989), "From socks to toilet paper roll, answers unfold in U.S. survey", Toronto Star, p. LIFE L2, Factiva TOR0000020080325dl9s019zs
- Steve (2009). "Toilet Paper Orientation Re: Brandweek 2009". Archived from the original on 2 February 2017.
- Weingarten, Gene (4 November 2008). "Chatological Humor". The Washington Post. Factiva WPCOM00020081105e4b40000a.
- Wolf, Sharyn (1999). So You Want to Get Married: Guerrilla Tactics for Turning a Date into a Mate. Plume. ISBN 9780452280120.
- Zayas, Alexandra (5 November 2009). "Inventors gather in Ybor City to pitch for Pitchmen". St. Petersburg Times. Archived from the original on 9 December 2009.
