= Cludgie =

Cludgie is Scots for a place to urinate and defecate.

It may refer to:

- toilet, the room
- toilet, the plumbing fixture
- outhouse
