= Chip Brian =

American businessman

(Earl) Chip Brian
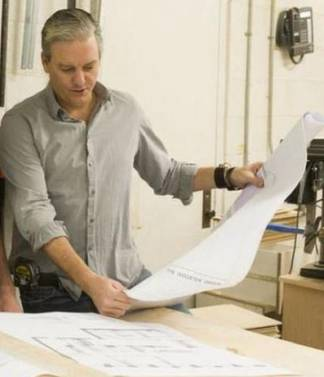
- Brian May 2013
- Born: November 11, 1970 (age 56); Los Angeles, California, US
- Education: Duke University
- Occupations: CEO of Best & Company / Design Development NYC, Inc.
- Board member of: Comtex News Network, Inc.

Earl W. "Chip" Brian III (born November 11, 1970) is an American financial services, information technology and construction entrepreneur, based in Long Island City.

Brian and his wife, the former Nina Sisselman, live in NYC with their two sons.

== School ==
Brian attended Trinity School in Manhattan and graduated from The Avon Old Farms School in Avon, Connecticut.

Brian graduated from Duke University with a Bachelor of Arts in political science. He is a member of the Sigma Alpha Epsilon fraternity. Brian serves on the Duke University Young Alumni Development Council and is a member of the university's alumni fundraising committee.

== Businesses ==
Prior to 2015, Brian was the president and CEO of Comtex News Network, Inc., which provides real-time news, Comtex SmarTrend market products, and economically useful information.

Comtex has launched a new product line developed by Brian: the proprietary trend trading alert system, SmarTrend. Brian has authored published articles about trend trading, and writes a column regarding industry group trends identified by his trend trading system.

Brian created products which include a daily stock market letter (Morning Call), stock news and market analysis generated by the SmarTrend Analytics Group, the SmarTrend Video Channel, and its flagship product SmarTrend Alerts. Comtex also formed a wholly owned subsidiary, LeGarde Capital Management LLC, which has begun to use the underlying quantitative process for investing capital. Comtex has offices in New York City; Boston, Massachusetts; and Alexandria, Virginia.

Brian joined Comtex in April 2004 as vice president of operations; was appointed president and chief operating officer in May 2005; and named CEO in November 2006.

Prior to Comtex, Brian held management positions with Nyfix Incorporated, Bank of New York, and HotJobs.com, a Yahoo company. From 2009 to 2010, he served on the board of directors of PastFuture, Inc., the parent company of the technology and social media website, GDGT.com.

Brian is also founder of Design Development NYC, an interior construction company for city or country residences. All construction management teams are LEED licensed, and fully Green compliant.

On May 3, 2017, the New York Daily News reported that Design Development NYC had engaged in wage theft. Chip Brian and Mike Daddio entered into a consent decree with the U.S. Department of Labor, in which they agreed personally to pay $726,989 in back wages and liquidated damages to 184 employees and take other corrective actions to resolve past overtime and recordkeeping violations of the federal Fair Labor Standards Act.

== Charities and non-profit ==
Brian served as the chairman of the Annual Sporting Clays Shoot for the Boy Scouts of America Greater New York Council, where he also served on the board of directors. Brian is a member of the Trinity School Alumni Giving Board, and has contributed time to the fundraising committees of the New York Blood-center, the Grosvenor House Benefit Committee and the Young Alumni Development Council of Duke University.
