= Toilet (room) =

Room for privately accessing a toilet, and often handwashing sink

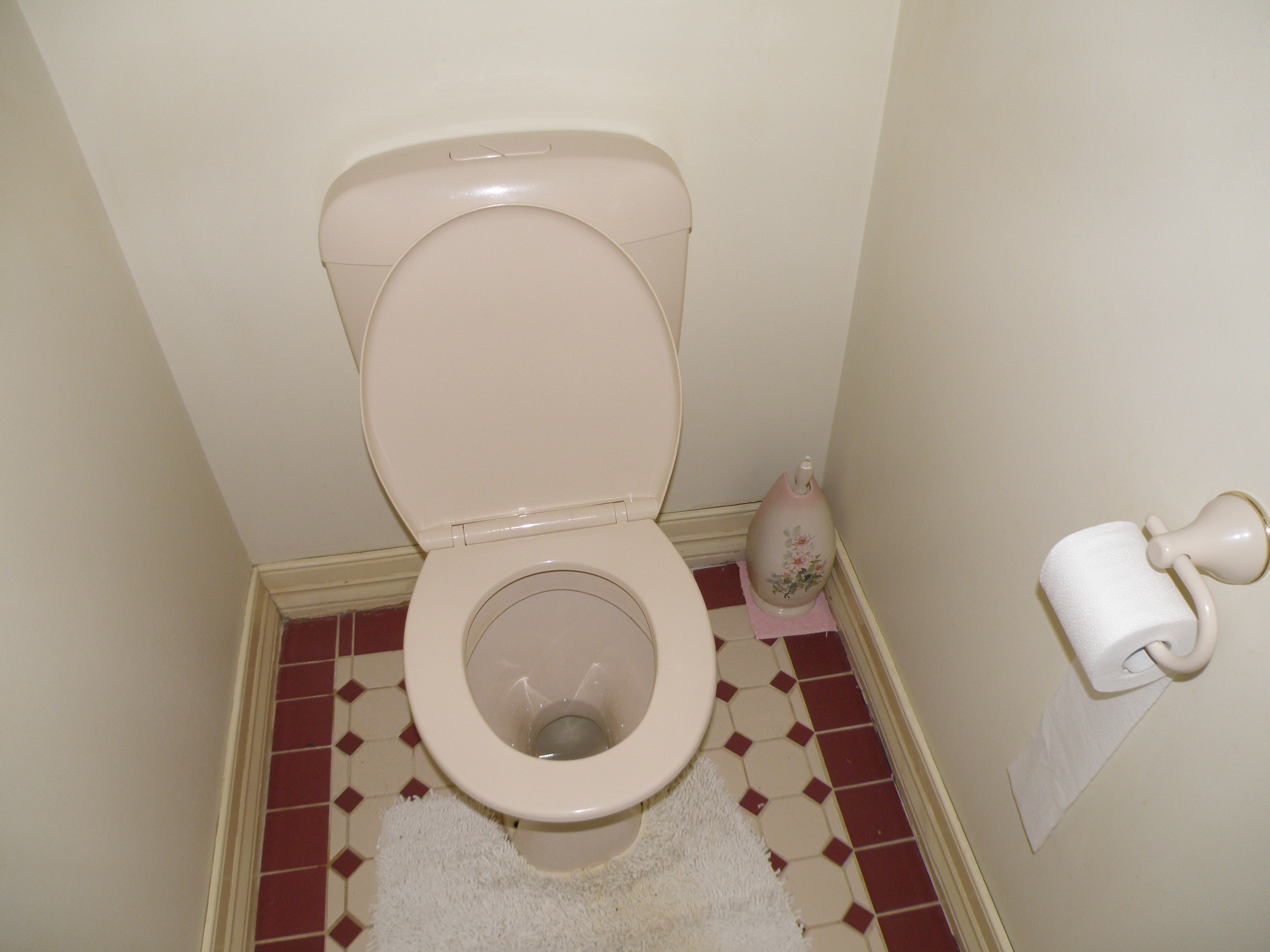
A small room with a flush toilet. A toilet brush (hidden in a decorative holder) and a toilet roll holder for toilet paper can be seen to the right of the flush toilet.

A toilet is a small room used for privately accessing the sanitation fixture (toilet) for urination and defecation. Toilet rooms often include a sink (basin) with soap/handwash for handwashing, as this is important for personal hygiene. These rooms are typically referred to in North America as half-bathrooms (half-baths; half of a whole or full-bathroom) in a private residence.

This room is commonly known as a "bathroom" in American English, a "toilet", "water closet" ("WC"), "lavatory", "loo" or “bathroom” in the United Kingdom and Ireland, a "washroom" in Canadian English, and by many other names across the English-speaking world.

== Names ==
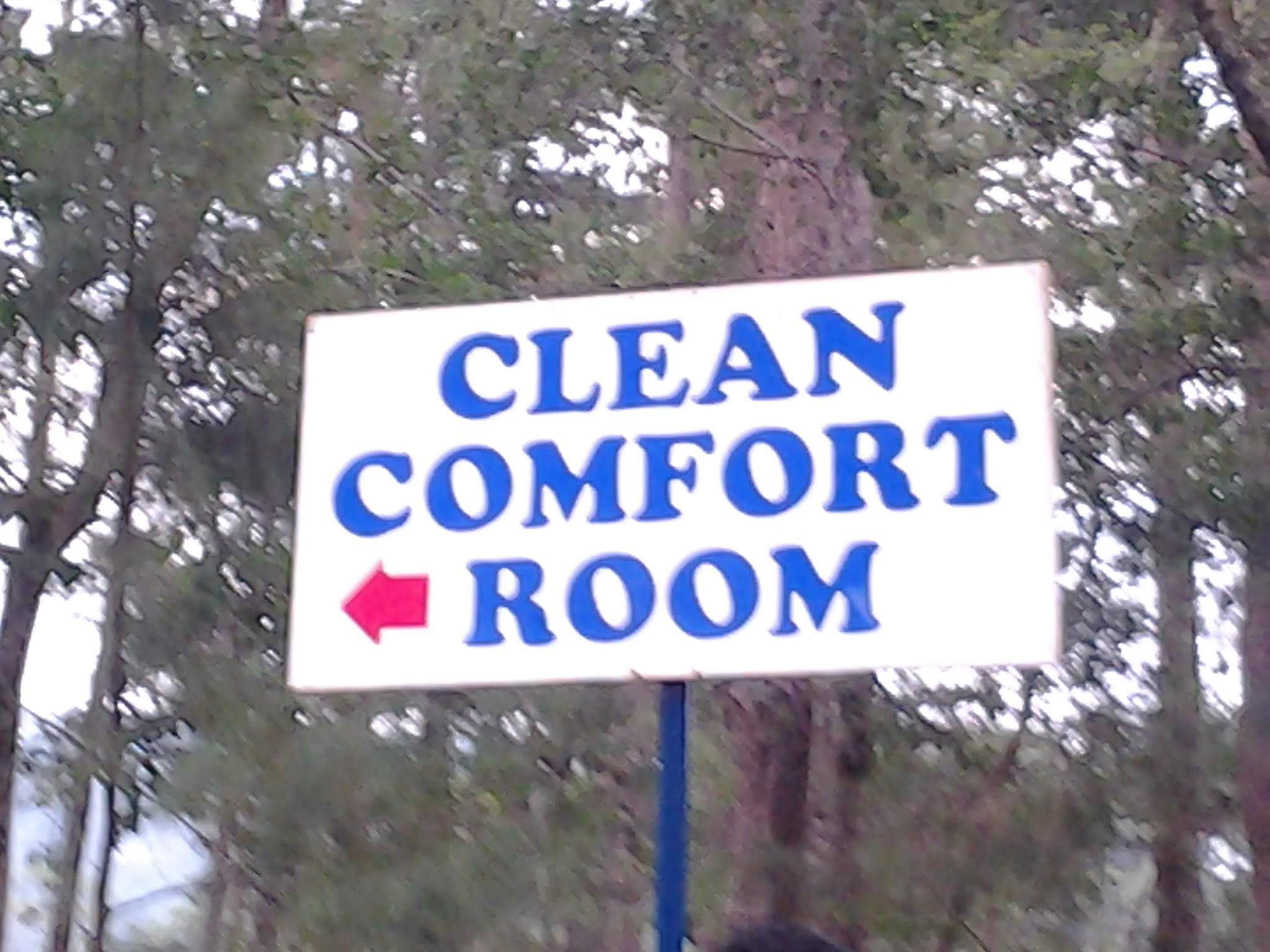
"Comfort Room" is used in Philippine English.

"Toilet" originally referred to personal grooming and came by metonymy to be used for the personal rooms used for bathing, dressing, and so on. It was then euphemistically used for the similarly private rooms used for urination and defecation. By metonymy, it then came to refer directly to the fixtures in such rooms. At present, the word refers primarily to such fixtures and using "toilet" to refer to the room or activity ("use the toilet") is somewhat blunt and may be considered indiscreet. (Note: In British contexts, it is considered non-U, with the upper class generally preferring "loo", "lavatory", and "bog".) It is, however, a useful term since it is quickly understood by English-speakers across the world, whereas more polite terms vary by region.

"Lavatory" (from the Latin lavatorium, "wash basin" or "washroom") was common in the 19th century and is still broadly understood, although it is taken as quite formal in American English, and more often refers to public toilets in Britain. The contraction "lav" is commonly used in British English.

In American English, the most common term for a private toilet is "bathroom", regardless of whether a bathtub or shower is present. In British English, "toilet" is the most common term, also used are "WC", an abbreviation for water closet, "lavatory", or "loo". In Australian English the words 'bog' or 'dunny' are common terms. In Philippine English, "comfort room" or its initialism "CR" is the most common term. Other terms are also used, some as part of a regional dialect.

Some forms of jargon have their own terms for toilets, including "lavatory" on commercial airplanes, "head" on ships, and "latrine" in military contexts. (Note: For other synonyms for toilet, see "bathroom" at Wikisaurus.) Larger houses often have a secondary room with a toilet and sink for use by guests. These are typically known as "powder rooms" or "half-baths" (half-bathroom) in North America, and "cloakrooms" in Britain.

== Other items in the room ==
The main item in the room is the sanitation fixture itself, the toilet. This may be the flushing sort, which is plumbed into a cistern (tank) operated by a ballcock (float valve). Or it may be a dry model, which does not need water.

The toilet room may also include a plunger, a rubber or plastic tool mounted on a handle, which is used to remove blockages from the toilet drain. Toilets often have a wall mirror above the sink for grooming, checking one's appearance and/or makeup. Some toilets have a cupboard where cleaning supplies and personal hygiene products may be kept. If it is a flush toilet, then the room usually also includes a toilet brush for cleaning the bowl.

Methods of anal cleansing vary between cultures. If the norm is to use paper, then typically the room will have a toilet roll holder, with the toilet paper hanging either next to or away from the wall. If instead, people are used to cleaning themselves with water, then the room may include a bidet shower (health faucet) or a bidet. Toilets such as the Washlet, popular in Japan, provide an automatic washing function.

A sink (hand basin), with soap, is usually present in the room or immediately outside it, to ensure easy handwashing. Above the sink there may be a mirror, either mounted on the wall, or on a medicine cabinet. This cabinet (which is more typically located in the household's main bathroom) typically contains prescription and over the counter drugs, first aid supplies, and grooming equipment for shaving or makeup.

== History ==
Into the modern era, humans typically practised open defecation or employed latrines or outhouses over a pit toilet in rural areas and used chamber pots emptied into streets or drains in urban ones. The Indus Valley civilization had particularly advanced sanitation, which included common use of private flush toilets. The ancient Greeks and Romans had public toilets and, in some cases, indoor plumbing connected to rudimentary sewer systems. The latrines of medieval monasteries were known as reredorters; in some cases, these were connected to sophisticated water systems that swept its effluent away without affecting the community's drinking, cooking, or washing water. In the early modern period, "night soil" from municipal outhouses became an important source of nitrates for creating gunpowder. 19th century refinements of the outhouse included the privy midden and the pail closet.

Indoor toilets were at first a luxury of the rich and only gradually spread to the lower classes. As late as the 1890s, building regulations in London did not require working-class housing to have indoor toilets; into the early 20th century, some English homes were built with an upstairs toilet for use by the owners and an outhouse for use by the servants. In some cases, there was a transitional stage where toilets were built into the house but accessible only from the outside. After World War I, all new housing in London and its suburbs had indoor toilets.

Bathrooms became standard later than toilets, but entered working-class houses at around the same time. For plumbing reasons, flush toilets have usually been located in or near residences' bathrooms. (Both were initially located above the kitchen and scullery on the same account.) In upper-class homes, the first modern lavatories were washrooms with sinks located near the bedrooms; in lower-class homes, there was often only a collapsible tub for bathing. In Britain, there was long a prejudice against having the toilet located in the bathroom proper: in 1904, Hermann Muthesius noted that "a lavatory [i.e., toilet] is practically never found in an English bathroom; indeed it is considered downright inadmissible to have one there". (Note: Muthesius, quoted in translation by Seligman in Long.) When toilets were placed within bathrooms, the original reason was cost savings. In 1876 Edward William Godwin, a progressive architect-designer, drew up affordable housing with the toilet in the bathroom, and faced criticism for it.

America and most European countries now combine their toilets and bathrooms. Separate toilets remain a builder's option even in places where the norm is for the toilet to be in the bathroom. In France, Japan, and some other countries, separate toilets remain the norm for reasons of hygiene and privacy. In modern homes outside of France, such separate toilets typically contain a sink. In Japan, the toilet sometimes has a built-in sink (whose waste water is used for the next flush) to allow users to clean themselves immediately. Japanese toilets also often provide special slippers—apart from those worn in the rest of the house—for use within the toilet.

== Society and culture ==
In English, all terms for toilets were originally euphemisms. It is generally considered coarse or even offensive to use such direct terms as "shitter", although they are used in some areas. Formerly, broadcast censorship even banned mentions of the euphemisms: Jack Paar temporarily quit the Tonight Show in February 1960 when NBC broadcast news footage in place of a joke he had taped involving the term "WC".

== Gallery ==
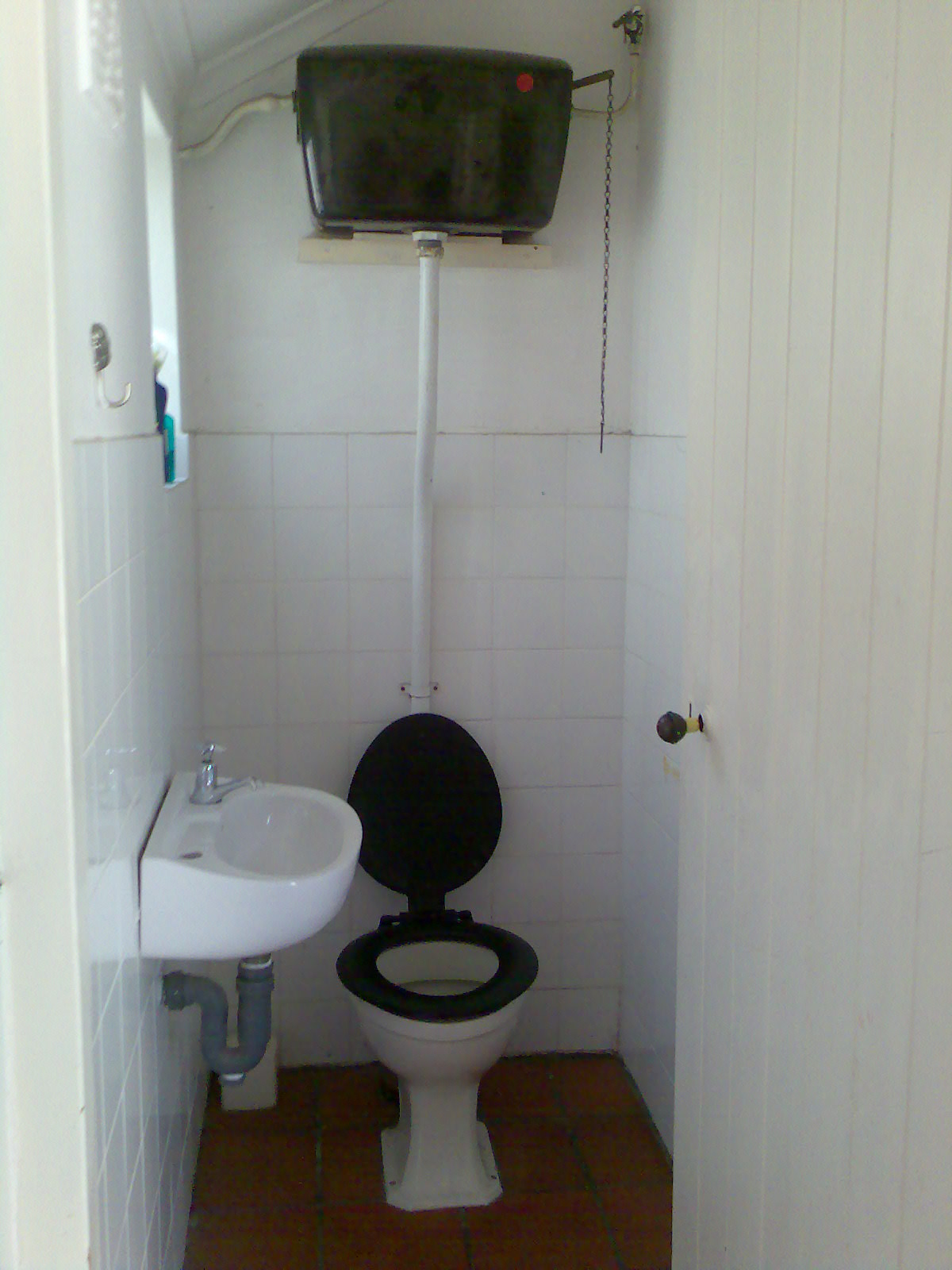
A toilet room with an older style flush toilet. The chain (on the upper right) is pulled to empty the elevated cistern (tank).

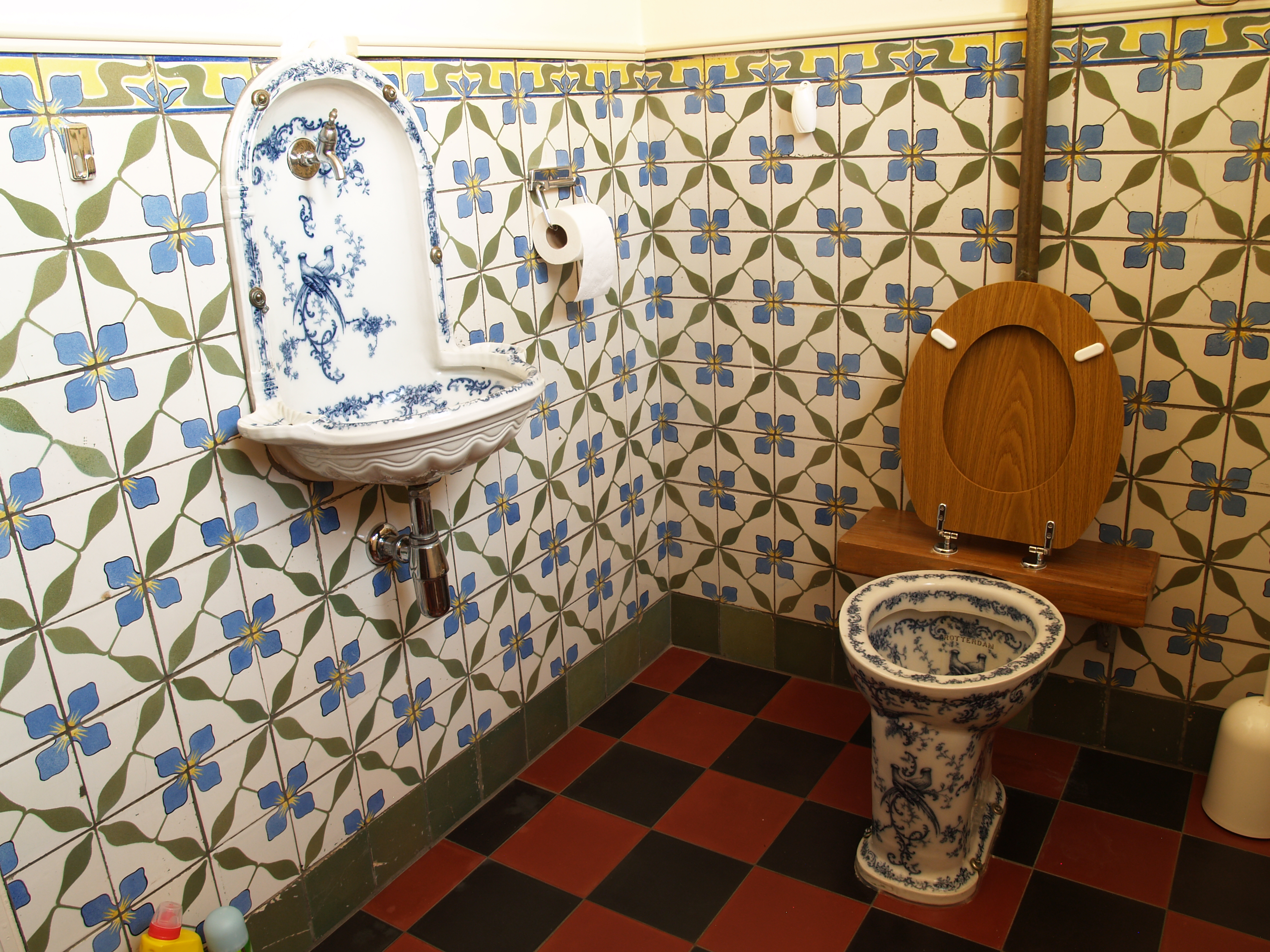
A Delftware-style toilet

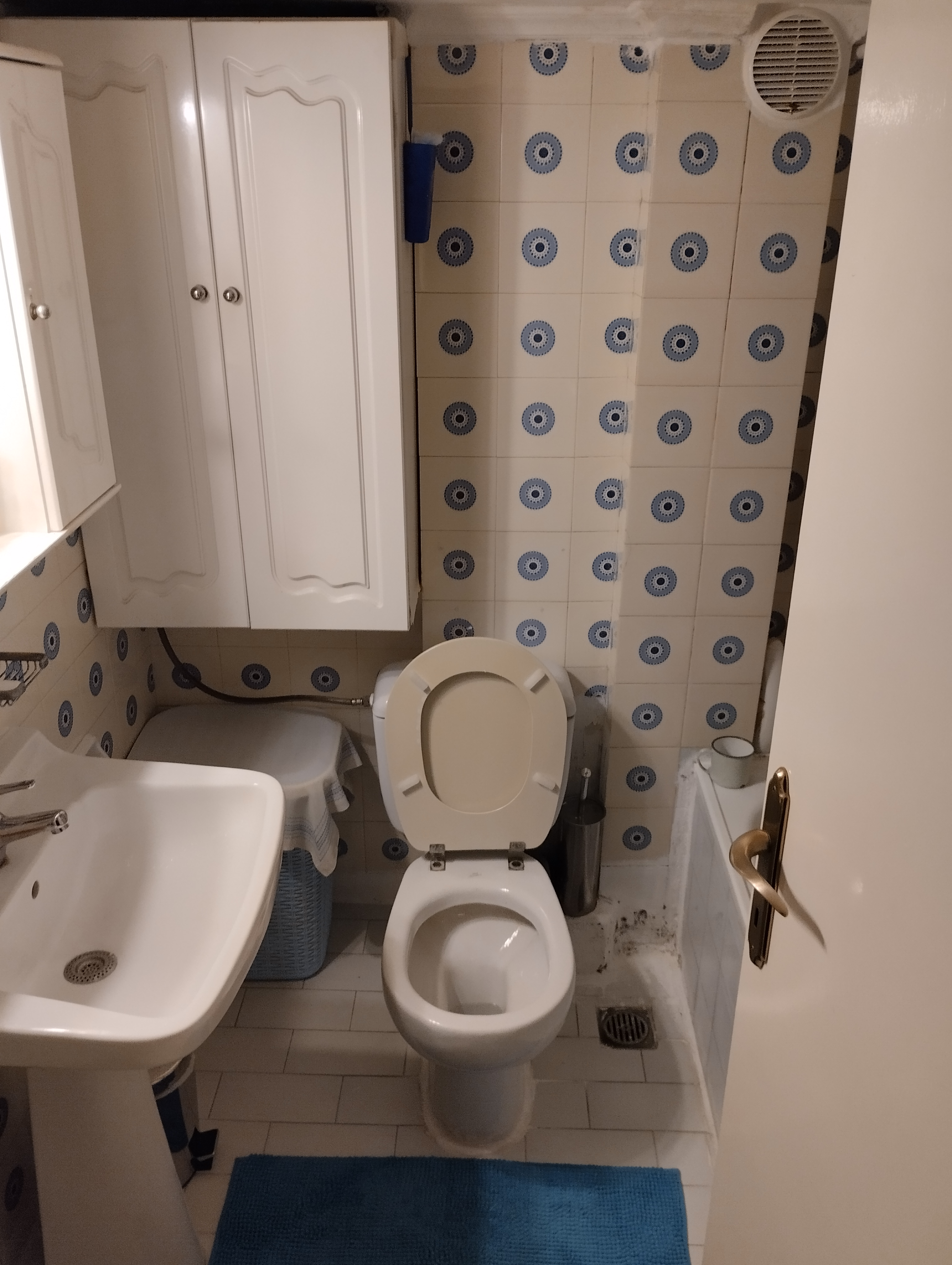
A toilet room in Greece constructed in the 70's with a modern style flush toilet

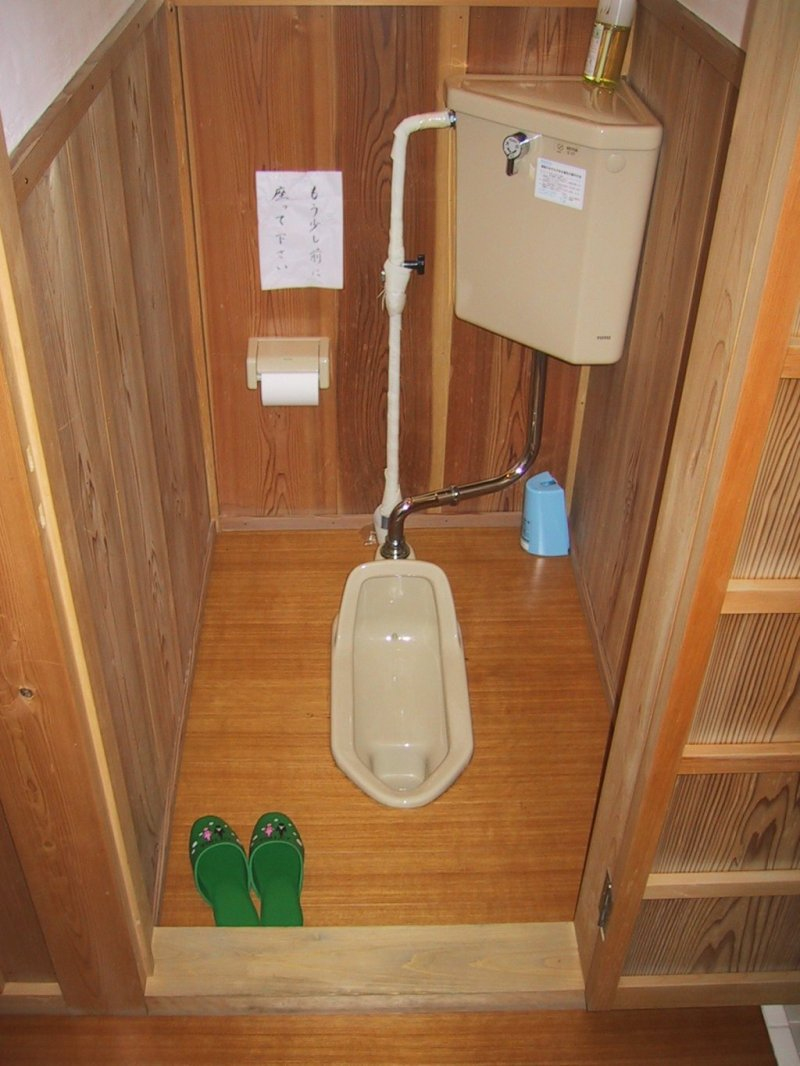
A Japanese temple hotel, with squat toilet and toilet slippers

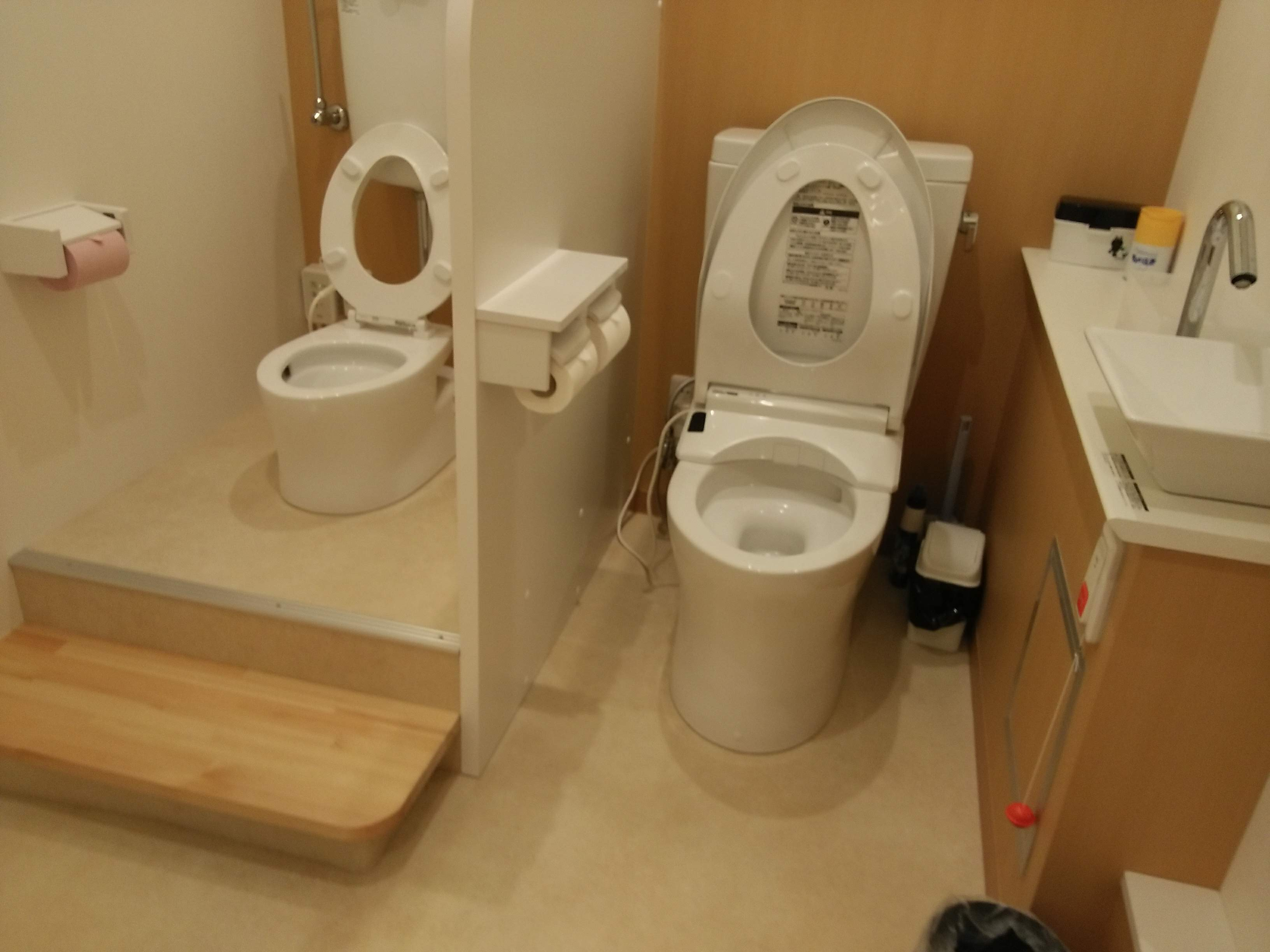
Smart toilet in Japan (see also Toilets in Japan).

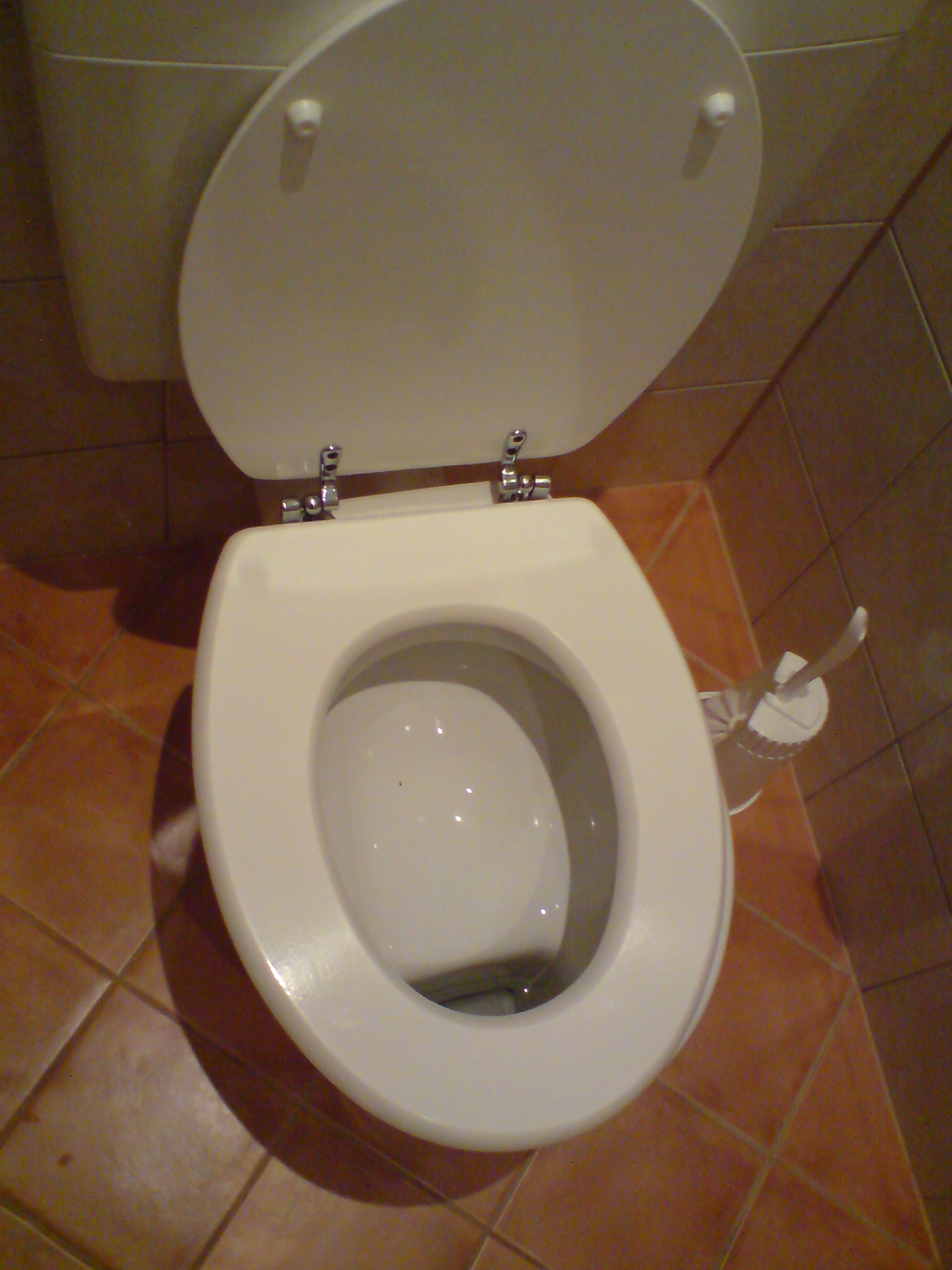
Traditional German Flachspüler toilet featuring a shallow platform (shelf) where waste rests before flushing, designed to prevent splashing and for inspecting waste for health reasons

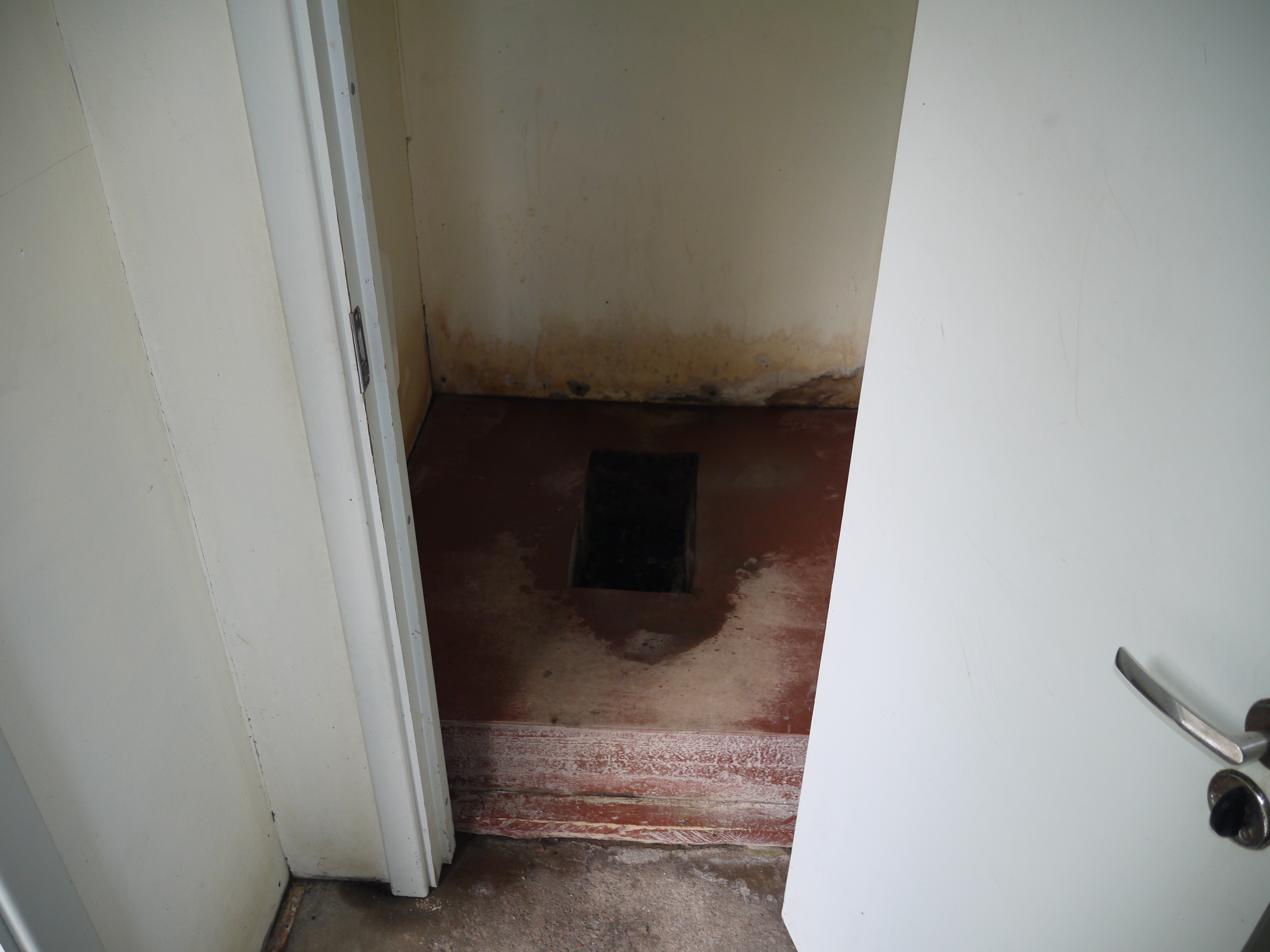
Squat pit toilet in Tsarskoye Selo, Russia

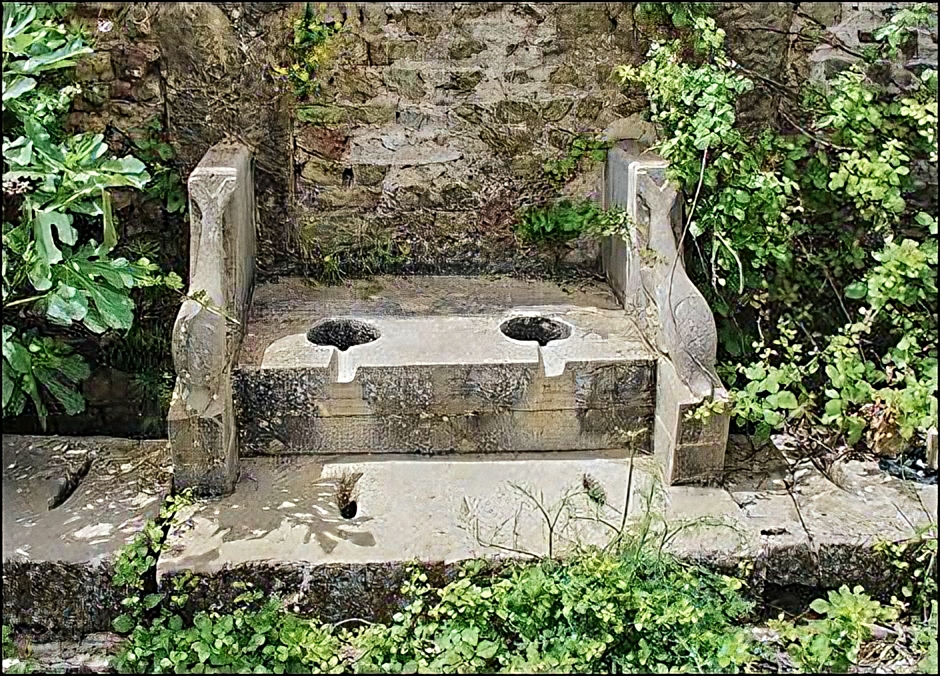
Double latrine at the Roman ruins of Timgad in Algeria

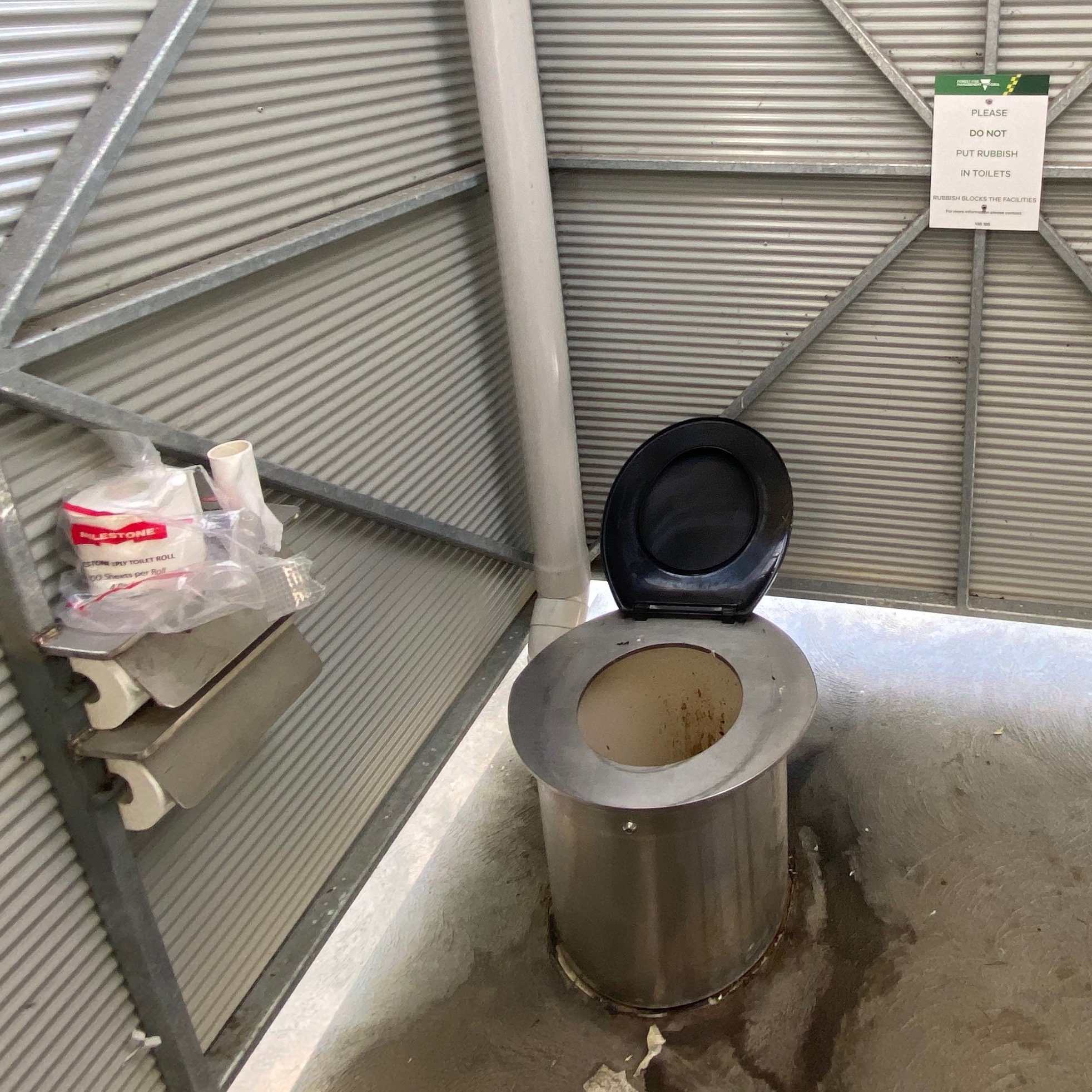
Australian 'long drop' pit latrine with ventilation pipe at a campsite in the Great Otway National Park

== See also ==
- Bathroom (for personal hygiene, with or without a toilet inside)
- Community toilet scheme
- EToilet
- Passenger train toilet
- Sanisette
- Sanitation
- Unisex public toilet
- Outhouse
