= Dow Jones News/Retrieval =

Dow Jones News/Retrieval was an online service offered by Dow Jones & Company beginning in 1973, which greatly expanded its subscriber numbers during the 1980s. It focused on financial information offering access to securities prices including quotes on stocks, bonds, options and mutual funds as well as a news database with items culled from The Wall Street Journal, Barron's and other sources, as well as sports reports, movie reviews, encyclopedia, electronic shopping, and email. Subscriber numbers rose from 11,000 in 1981 to 205,000 by 1986.

In the 1990s it also provided access to articles from The New York Times and Westlaw.

Fees for using the service were relatively expensive. It cost $30 (equivalent to $69 in 2025) to subscribe followed by a $12 annual membership fee (equivalent to $28 in 2025) . Additionally, prime-time usage charges were $2.30 per minute, and after-hours access was 44 cents a minute for basic services and general information, and $1.76 a minute for detailed reports such as SEC filings. "Blue Chip" and "Executive" discount plans were available for users who spent a lot of time on the service.

In the mid 1990s, the strategy was changed to provide access to the service to a broader business audience and the pricing was simplified, new software and web-based access was launched and the company became more customer-focused under Timothy M. Andrews, a longtime Dow Jones editorial, technology and marketing executive. The name was changed to Dow Jones Interactive. The $125 million revenue business became part of joint venture with Reuters Business Briefing in May 1999. The new company was called Dow Jones Reuters Business Interactive and the flagship product and the company were rebranded as Factiva later that year.

Dow Jones Interactive was shut down on June 30, 2003.
