= Playout247 =

Playout247 new company's name Vision247(website link) is a provider of network broadcast automation services for multiple types of broadcasting. The company is part of a group of companies that comprises Playout247, Vision IPTV and Solo Data. The company is a private company.

== History ==
Playout247 was founded in 2005 by its chairman, Matjaž Vidmar, and CEO Petra Oblak. In 2006 Playout247 launched their IPTV head-end and IPTV Portal hosting service. In May 2008 Playout247 announced the launch of 7 channels across Europe on the Kabel Kiosk platform in partnership with MME (Music Media Enterprises).

Later in 2008 Playout247 and PlayBox Technology formed a partnership to deliver an IP and satellite combined playout operation in central London. The service would support 24 conventional satellite channels and 38 Internet channels at full satellite broadcast quality and was the culmination of a two-year development project. In September 2010, on the back of a 40% growth in revenues, Playout247 announced a major investment programme that would more than double this capacity taking it up to 60 channels.

In October 2010 Playout247 and sister company Vision IPTV won the playout account for Renault TV with Publicis Media.

In February 2011 announced the completion of two studios designed to deliver a single solution for live streaming and satellite playout.

== Press ==
- 17 October 2006—Playout247 launched their new service providing an Internet IPTV head-end and IPTV Portal hosting including front-end custom development re-branding service as part of the package.
- May 2008—Playout247 have launched 7 new channels across Europe on the Kabel Kiosk platform in partnership with MME (Music Media Enterprises).
- October 2008—PlayBox partners with Playout247 for broadcast and IPTV solutions.
- 16 September 2010 (Close-Up Media via Comtex) -- Playout247 and Vision IPTV, sister companies, announced the beginning of a major investment program in studio and broadcast technology supported by capacity increases.
- Cannes, Oct 06, 2010 (M2 PRESSWIRE via Comtex) -- Digital marketing leader, Publicis Entertainment has announced that it has awarded the IPTV distribution contract for their Renault TV account to Vision IPTV and sister company Playout247.
- 10 January 2011. Soho Data Holdings, sister company to Vision IPTV and Playout247, today signed a £10m agreement with Xiking Culture Media (Beijing), to establish a data centre and render farm, aimed at the creative video and TV industries.
- 25 February 2011. Playout247 Opens State Of The Art Live TV Studio Facility.
