= Comtex =

Online business news distributor

Comtex News Network, Inc.
- Type: Public
- Traded as: Expert Market: CMTX
- Industry: News, Internet, Financial Information Services
- Founded: 1980; 46 years ago (incorporated as Academic Micropublishing Company in New York)
- Headquarters: New York City, United States
- Key people: Kan Devnani (president and CEO)
- Products: Custom newswires, electronic news feeds, stock trend information, electronic newsletters
- Website: comtex.com

Comtex News Network, Inc. is a distributor of news on the Internet, specializing in the business and financial market sectors. The company is a wholesaler of electronic real-time news and content gathered from thousands of sources, including national and international news bureaus, agencies and publications (including Business Wire, Dow Jones Newswires, The McClatchy Company, PR Newswire and United Press International).

== History ==
Comtex was incorporated in New York in 1980 and operated under the name Academic Micropublishing Company, Inc. until 1981, when the name was changed to Comtex Scientific Corporation. From 1989 until 1991 Infotechnology ("Infotech"), a Delaware business development corporation, then principally engaged in the information and communications business, acquired majority ownership of Comtex. From 1991 until 2006 AMASYS Corporation, a successor in interests to Infotech, held a majority ownership position, via a combination of stock and debt. In 2006 Comtex repaid all of its outstanding long-term debt and AMASYS sold all its shares. In late 1999 Comtex changed its name to Comtex News Network, Inc.

In 2004 Chip Brian joined Comtex as VP, Operations and was named President in 2005 and CEO in 2006. A new management team was charged with the reducing debt, strengthening the company's financial base and diversifying product lines.

== Consistency ==
Comtex enhances and standardizes the content received from such sources in order to provide editorially consistent and technically uniform products to its customers. Its processing includes adding stock ticker symbols, indexing by keyword and category and converting diverse publisher materials and formats into the industry standard delivery format NewsML, an XML derivative.

== Product areas ==
The company's product lines include CustomWires, subject-specific newswires including energy, finance, international and public company information; Comtex TopNews, comprising several categories of editorially selected news stories of the day; Publisher Full Feeds, which are deliveries from specific publishers providing their content offerings; and SmarTrend, based on proprietary time-series pattern recognition analysis. Comtex clients include information distributors such as MarketWatch, Factiva, Bloomberg, and Reuters, websites, corporate intranets and market data applications.

== Business structure ==
Consistent with standard practice in the information aggregation industry, Comtex generally has renewable long-term contractual relationships with those information providers and information distributors with which it does business. Comtex generates revenues primarily from charges to distributors for the licensing of enhanced content, including CustomWires, TopNews products and publishers' full feeds. Royalties are based upon the customers' business and revenue models such that success in their chosen markets generates increasing revenues for Comtex. Fees and royalties from information distributors comprise the majority of Comtex's revenue. Comtex operates and reports in one segment, business information services.
