= Toilet roll holder =

Item that holds a roll of toilet paper

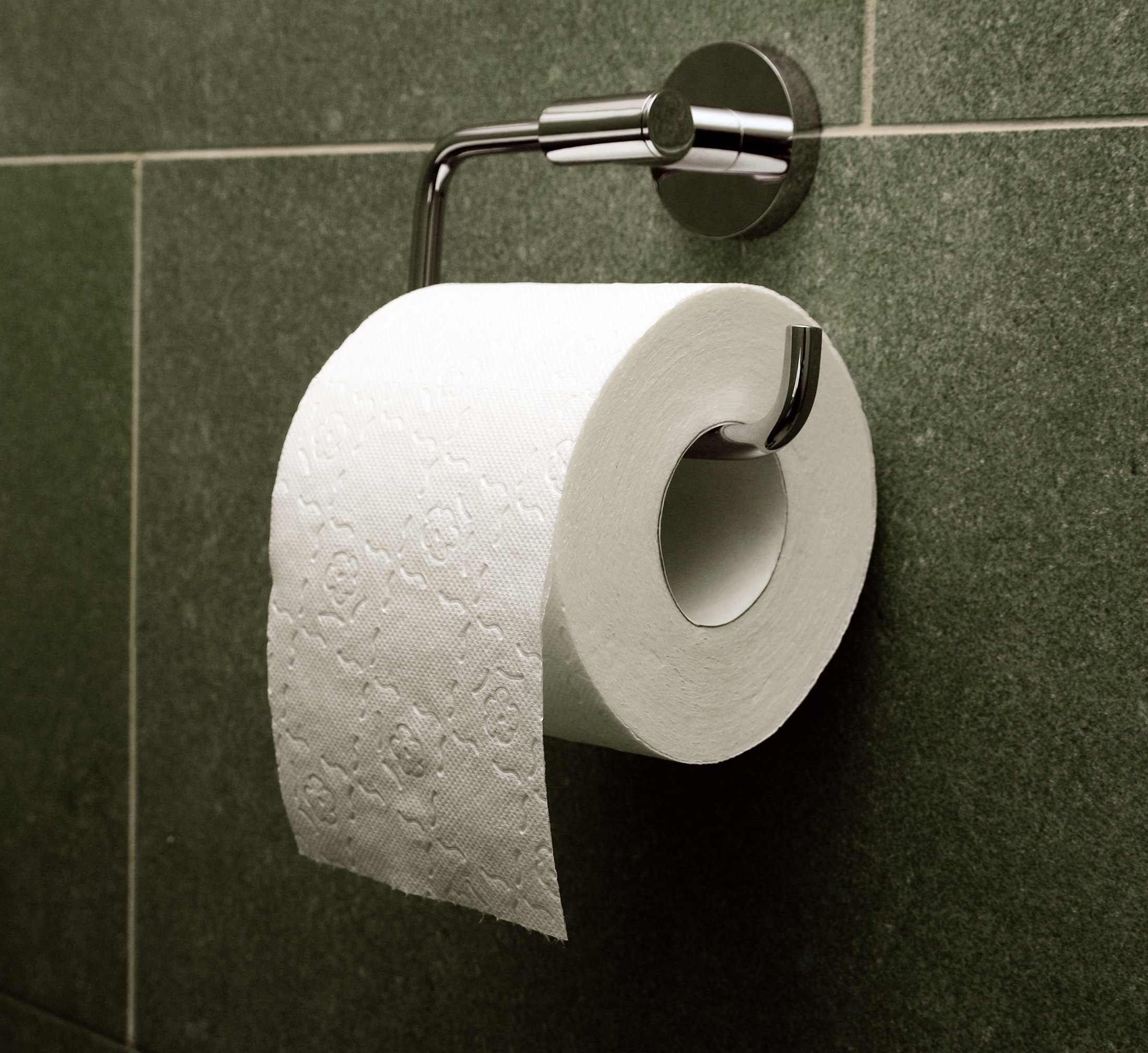
A traditional wall-mounted toilet roll holder with a horizontal axle.

A toilet-roll holder, also known as a toilet paper dispenser, is a contraption used to hold a roll of toilet paper. Common models include a hinged length of wire mounted horizontally on a wall, a thicker axle either recessed into a wall or mounted on a frame, or a freestanding vertical pole on a base. In recent years, automatic toilet paper dispensers that automatically fold and cut the toilet paper are being installed in public toilets.

== Main holders ==
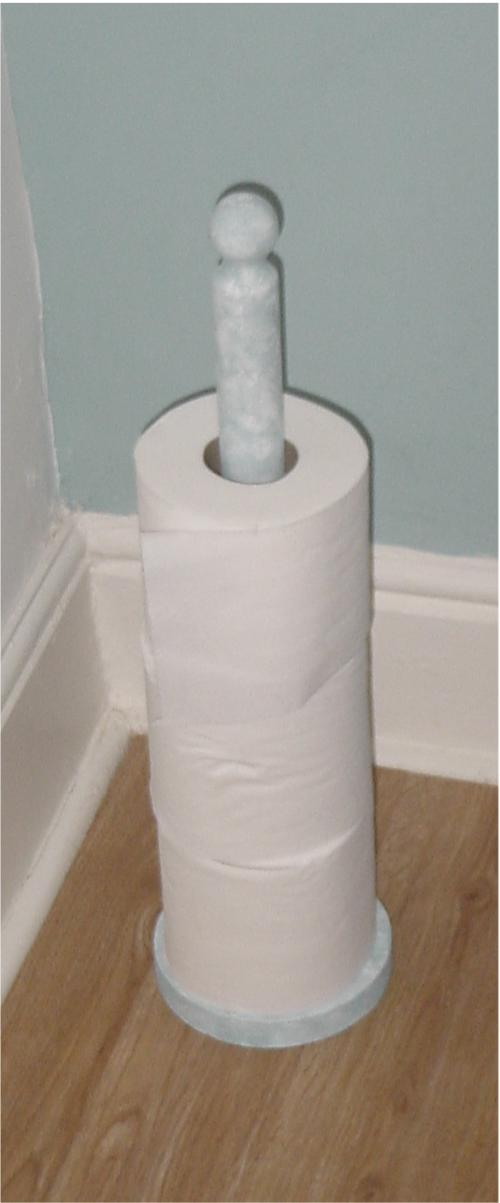
A vertical pole toilet roll holder.

A horizontal axle design is found in most homes, and also in many schools. It is easy to use due to its low friction and ease of refilling. This is the type of holder most commonly assumed about when toilet paper orientation is mentioned.

Whereas some have the roll mounted at a fixed distance from the surface on which it is mounted, others have an axle on a hinge or groove that allows it to move and maintain contact even as the roll shrinks from use. These designs provide additional friction to make it easier to tear off a piece of tissue. More sophisticated designs include a curved horizontal plate that covers the roll, thus removing the necessity of touching the roll, and a protruding horizontal bump that creates resistance to facilitate single-handedly pulling off slices of paper. These roll holders can be used in both under and over roll orientation, but may be difficult to use in the under orientation.

Originally intended to hold a stock of replacement rolls, the vertical pole has become the only paper holder in some households. It is particularly useful in homes where the family has mixed handedness. Its drawbacks include that there is a lot more friction than in other types of toilet roll holders, and thus not as easy to use.

== Automatic dispenser ==
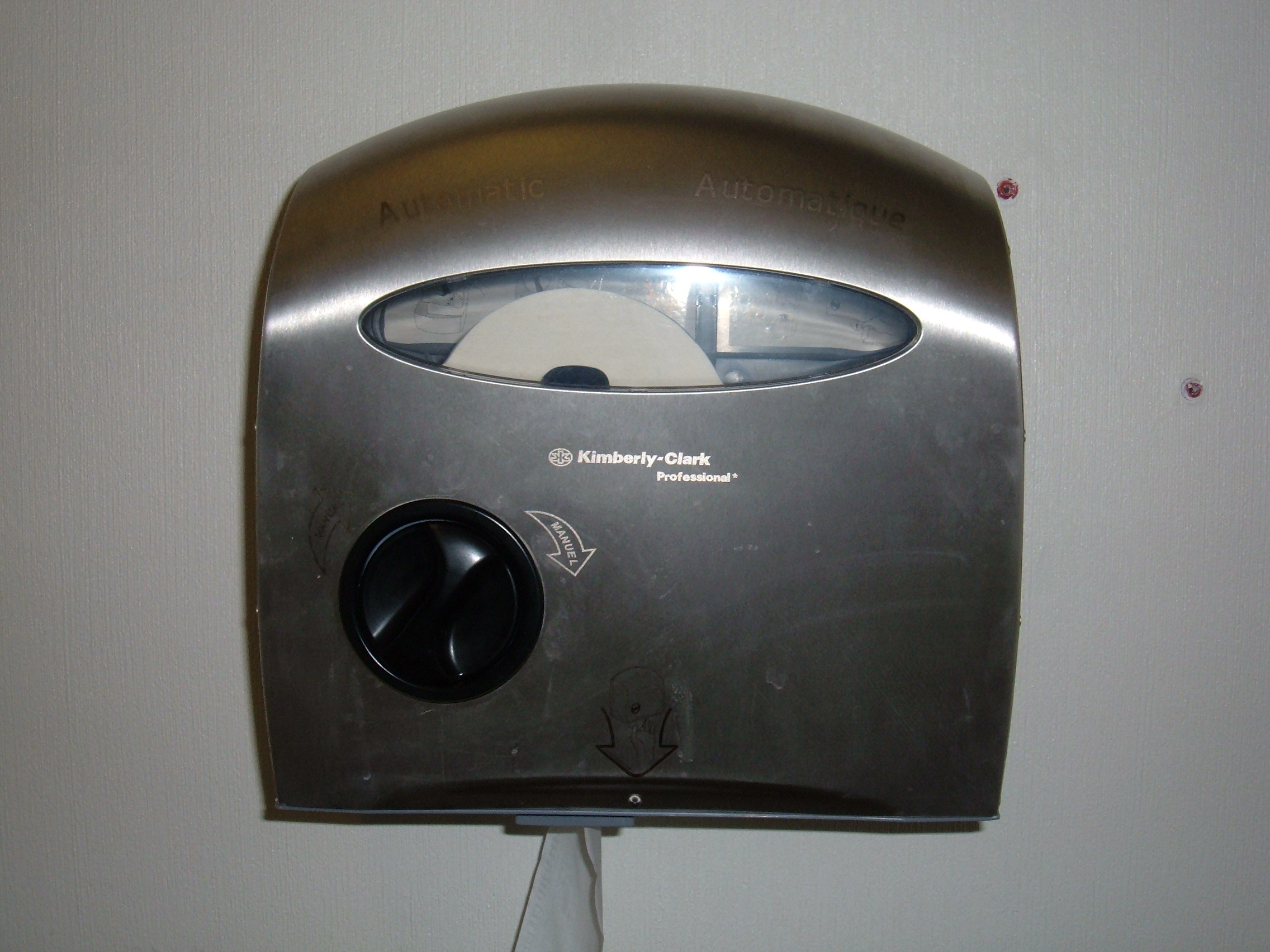
Kimberly-Clark introduced an automatic toilet paper dispenser in January 2008.

An automatic toilet paper dispenser can be either button or sensor-activated to fold and cut the toilet paper automatically. Automatic toilet paper dispensers can help aid disabled users, especially in large facilities. Examples are the Camitool by the Japanese company Shikoku, which uses motion sensors to dispense the toilet paper; the SCOTT by Kimberly-Clark, released in 2007, which is also motion activated, though also has a manual knob; and the OriFuji, introduced in 2015, which automatically cuts the toilet paper and folds it into a neat triangle shape.

== Public toilets ==
The holders in many public toilets are designed to make it difficult for patrons to steal the toilet rolls. Various contraptions have been devised to lock the spare rolls away, and release them only when the active roll is used up.

An increasing number of public toilets are furnished with holders that hold very large rolls of toilet paper. Others hold two large rolls with an access door that allows the user to switch between roll one and roll two when one roll is empty. These are designed to save money by reducing the frequency of janitorial services to restock the paper.

In many toilets, especially in elementary schools, a dispenser releases only a small square of toilet paper to prevent a user from intentionally clogging the toilet with large amounts of paper.

Coin-operated dispensers have also been developed.

== Orientation ==
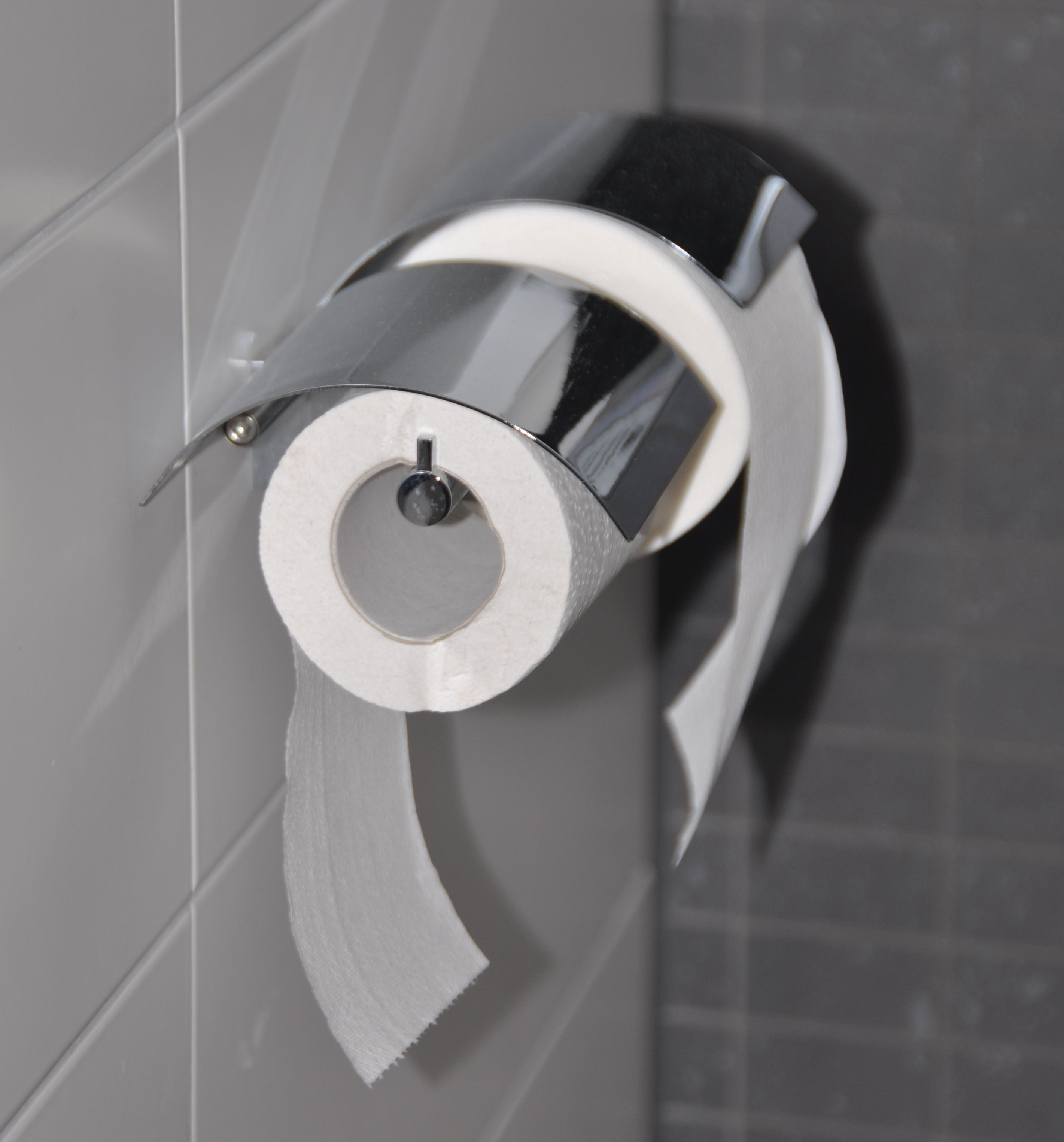
These are two paper holders: the closest one has an under orientation, while the further away one has an over orientation.

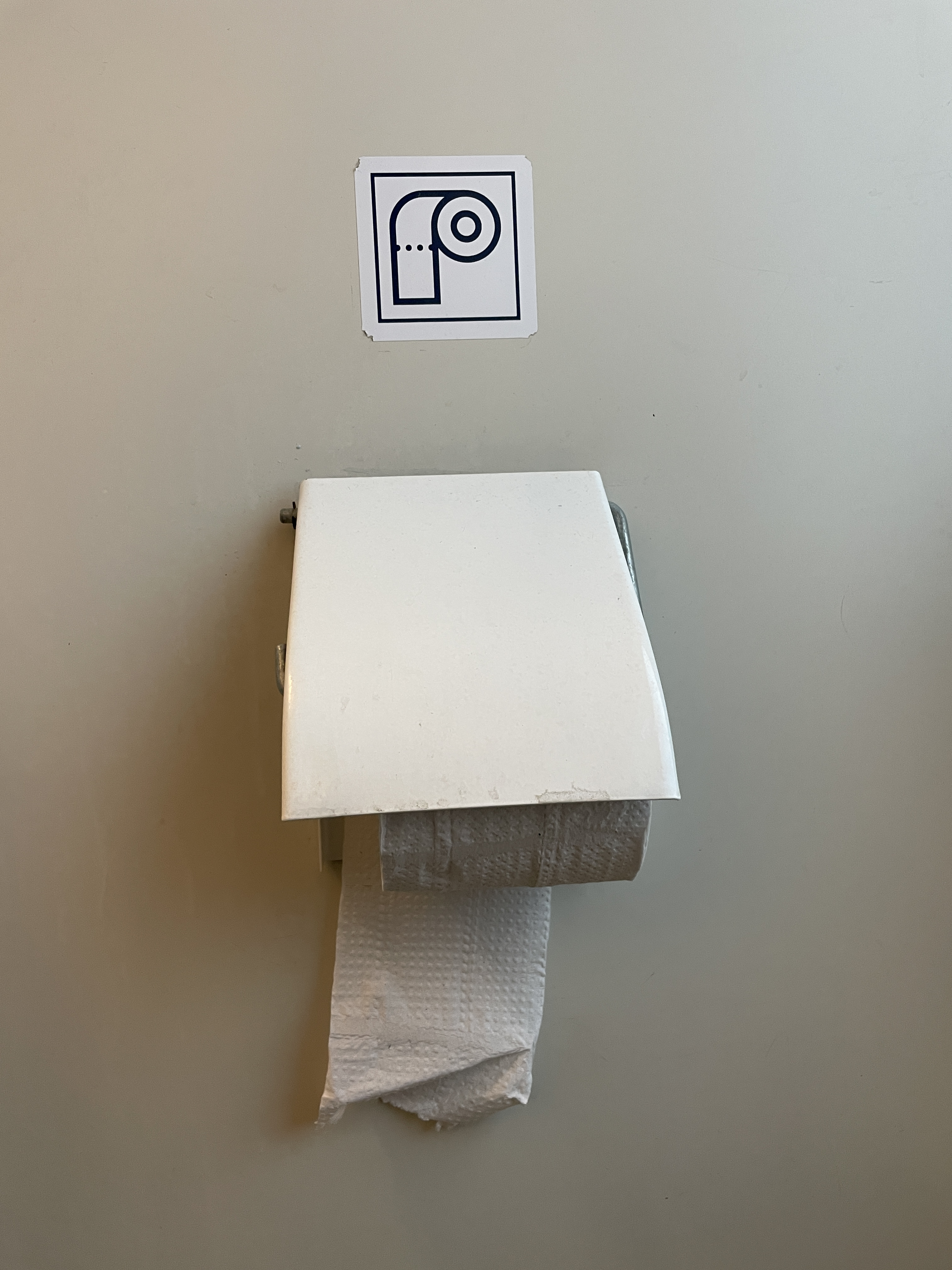
Pictogram with over orientation, paper holder with under orientation.

Some toilet roll holders or dispensers allow the toilet paper to hang in front of (over) or behind (under) the roll when it is placed parallel to the wall. This divides opinions about which orientation is better. Arguments range from aesthetics, hospitality, and cleanliness to paper conservation, ease of detaching sheets, and compatibility with pets. The US advice column Ask Ann Landers reported that the subject was the most controversial issue in the column's history and, at 15,000 letters in 1986, provoked the highest number of responses. Some writers have proposed that preference for one orientation over the other may have connections to age, sex, or political philosophy, and survey evidence has shown a correlation with socioeconomic status.

The main reasons given by people to explain why they hang their toilet paper a given way are ease of grabbing and habit. Some particular advantages cited for each orientation include: hanging over reduces the risk of accidentally brushing the wall or cabinet with one's knuckles, potentially transferring grime and germs; makes it easier to visually locate and to grasp the loose end; gives the option to fold over the last sheet to show that the room has been cleaned; and is generally the intended direction of viewing for the manufacturer's branding, so patterned toilet paper looks better this way.

The under position provides a tidier appearance, in that the loose end can be more hidden from view; reduces the risk of a toddler or a house pet such as a cat unrolling the toilet paper when batting at the roll; and in a recreational vehicle may reduce unrolling during driving. Partisans have claimed that each method makes it easier to tear the toilet paper on a perforated sheet boundary.

In various surveys, around 70% of people prefer the over position. In a survey of 1,000 Americans, Cottonelle found that "overs" are more likely than "unders" to notice a roll's direction (74 percent), to be annoyed when the direction is incorrect (24 percent), and to have flipped the direction at a friend's home (27 percent). According to W. C. Privy's Original Bathroom Companion, Number 2, "By more than 4 to 1, older folks prefer to have their toilet paper dispense over the front." The same claim is made by James Buckley's The Bathroom Companion for people older than 50. Toilet paper orientation is sometimes mentioned as a hurdle for married couples. The issue may also arise in businesses and public places. At the Amundsen–Scott Research Station at the South Pole, complaints have been raised over which way to install toilet paper. It is unclear if one orientation is more economical than the other. The Centralian Advocate attributes a claim to Planet Green that over saves on paper usage.

Various toilet paper dispensers are available which avoid the question of over or under orientation; for example, single sheet dispensers, jumbo roll dispensers in which the toilet roll is perpendicular to the wall, and twin roll dispensers. Swivelling toilet paper dispensers have been developed which allow the paper to be unrolled in either direction.
