= CABSAT =

Broadcast digital media and satellite expo

CABSAT کاب سات
- Status: Active
- Genre: Exhibitions, conferences, workshops
- Frequency: Annually
- Venue: Dubai World Trade Centre
- Location: Dubai
- Country: United Arab Emirates
- Most recent: 12–14 March 2019
- Next event: Tue, Oct 26, 2021 – Thu, Oct 28, 2021
- Website: www.cabsat.com

CABSAT (Arabic: کاب سات) is an annual largest broadcast digital media and satellite expo in the Middle East and Africa.
