= Conversational Capital =

Conversational Capital: How to Create Stuff People Love to Talk About
- Author: Bertrand Cesvet; Tony Babinski; Eric Alper
- Language: English
- Subject: Marketing
- Publisher: Pearson Education
- Publication date: August 7, 2008
- Publication place: Canada
- Media type: Print (Hardcover)
- Pages: 208
- ISBN: 978-0-13-714550-8
- OCLC: 214935159
- Dewey Decimal: 658.8/27 22
- LC Class: HF5415.1255 .C47 2009

Conversational Capital: How to Create Stuff People Love to Talk About is a book about engineering word-of-mouth into brand experiences. Contrary to the conventional theories of mass marketing literature, which teach that one must scream something ten times to be heard once, the authors teach that because we are all social storytellers, a product experience that is worthy of telling as one's own authentic story creates enormous brand capital in the form of meaningful and influential conversations.

Developed by three international brand architects, the project presents their perspectives on creative and strategic leadership through case-based insights drawn from works associated with companies and organizations including Adidas, Cirque du Soleil, Red Bull and MGM Grand.

== Overview ==
Based on their experiences with some of the world's recognized generators of word-of-mouth, the authors behind Conversational Capital began to realize that experiences had residual value—value that extended further than mere memories but instead resided in the realm of identity-shaping and storytelling. That is to say, when an experience was sufficiently powerful or transformative for an individual, they felt compelled to make the experience part of their own life story, and thereby propagate the story of the experience as part of their own (and now more exciting) identity. With this in mind, Bertrand Cesvet, Tony Babinski and Eric Alper began to deconstruct the antecedents to word-of-mouth. Invariably, they found that the elements that gave rise to the conversations of consumers consisted of eight possible drivers. Critically, these elements fed into doing two things for the experience in question: 1) making it meaningful and 2) making it intense.

The authors of Conversational Capital share these eight key ingredients to embedding the makings of word-of-mouth into every consumer encounter with brands. They term these elements the Eight Engines of Conversational Capital.

== Summary ==
=== The Eight Engines ===
1. Myths are the narratives that become part of the very fabric of consumption because they provide important clues as to fundamental meaning of that act.

2. Rituals are an essential part of how human beings create and formalize meaning. The presence of ritual marks out an experience as deeper in meaning - a phenomenon that is true for consumer experiences, as well.

3. Exclusive Product Offering (E.P.O.) is about allowing consumers to create an experience that asserts and actualizes their individuality; to, in a world of seven billion people, feel and be unique.

4. Relevant Sensorial Oddity (R.S.O.) is about stimulating the range of senses (sight, sound, taste, touch, and scent) with something that will resonate in a meaningful way.

5. Icons are signs and symbols that clearly demarcate a consumption experience from any other.

6. Tribalism is about the power of a brand experience to inspire the association of like-minded people.

7. Endorsement is not about celebrity — it's about how the meaning and intensity of a brand experience naturally lead to credible people organically endorsing it.

8. Continuity is a strong harbinger of reputation, a fact that rests on the unity between what you promise, what people expect and what you deliver.

The authors also recognize that Conversation Capital is nothing without conversational liquidity—the ability to share the stories as broadly as possible, and perhaps for this reason they frequently reference and recognize the open-source movement and its way of creating connected communities that transcend geographic and other boundaries.

== See also ==
- The Five Dysfunctions of a Team
