= Factiva =

Business information and research tool

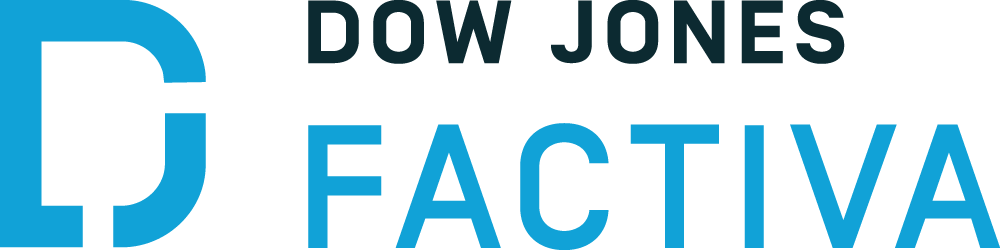
- Founded: 1999
- Owner: News Corp
- Parent: Dow Jones & Company
- Website: www.factiva.com

Factiva is a business information and research tool owned by Dow Jones & Company. Factiva aggregates content from both licensed and free sources. Providing organizations with search, alerting, dissemination, and other information management capabilities.

== History ==
The company was founded as a joint-venture between Reuters and Dow Jones & Company in May 1999 under the Dow Jones Reuters Business Interactive name, and renamed Factiva six months later. Timothy M. Andrews, a longtime Dow Jones executive, was founding president and chief executive of the venture.

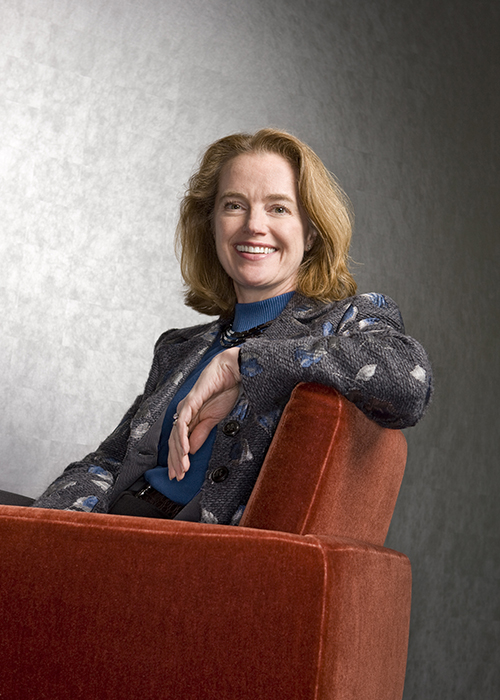
Clare Hart in 2008

Andrews was succeeded by Clare Hart in January 2000, another longtime Dow Jones executive, who was serving as Factiva's vice president and director of global sales.

It developed modules with Microsoft, Oracle Corp., IBM and Yahoo!. Factiva has also partnered with EuroSpider, Comintelli, PeopleSoft, Media Map, Biz360, Choice Point, BTRadianz, AtHoc, and Reuters. Factiva has also been included as of March 2003 in Microsoft's Office 2003 program as one of the News research options within the Research Pane.

In 2005, Factiva acquired two private companies: London-based 2B Reputation Intelligence Ltd. and Denver, Colorado-based taxonomy services and software firm, Synapse, the Knowledge Link Corporation. 2B was a technology and consulting business, specializing in media monitoring and reputation management. Synapse provided taxonomy management software, pre-built taxonomies and taxonomy-building and indexing services.

This acquisition brought with it Synaptica, the taxonomy management software tool developed by Synapse, and Taxonomy Warehouse, a website developed by Synapse. Both Synaptica and Taxonomy Warehouse were developed by Factiva after the acquisition and are now owned by Dow Jones.

In 2006, Reuters sold its 50 percent share of Factiva to Dow Jones. Factiva was integrated into the Enterprise Media Group within Dow Jones. Clare Hart was the executive vice president of this operating group.

In 2007, Factiva was included as a Dow Jones company sold to Rupert Murdoch's News Corp.

Factiva provides searching by free-text, as well as region, subject, author, industry and company metadata. Searches can be further filtered by publication, language and date range.

Factiva offers a number of enterprise integration options, including a fully comprehensive web services API, the Factiva Developers Kit. This toolkit allows organizations to embed Factiva content and services within enterprise workflow applications.

In 2008 Dow Jones launched the website Synaptica Central to highlight the Synaptica tool and to discuss controlled vocabularies and semantic technologies.

In 2012, Dow Jones announced a new search platform for its digital network based on technology licensed from MarkLogic Corporation.

== See also ==
- Dow Jones News/Retrieval
- Media monitoring service
