= List of water-related charities =

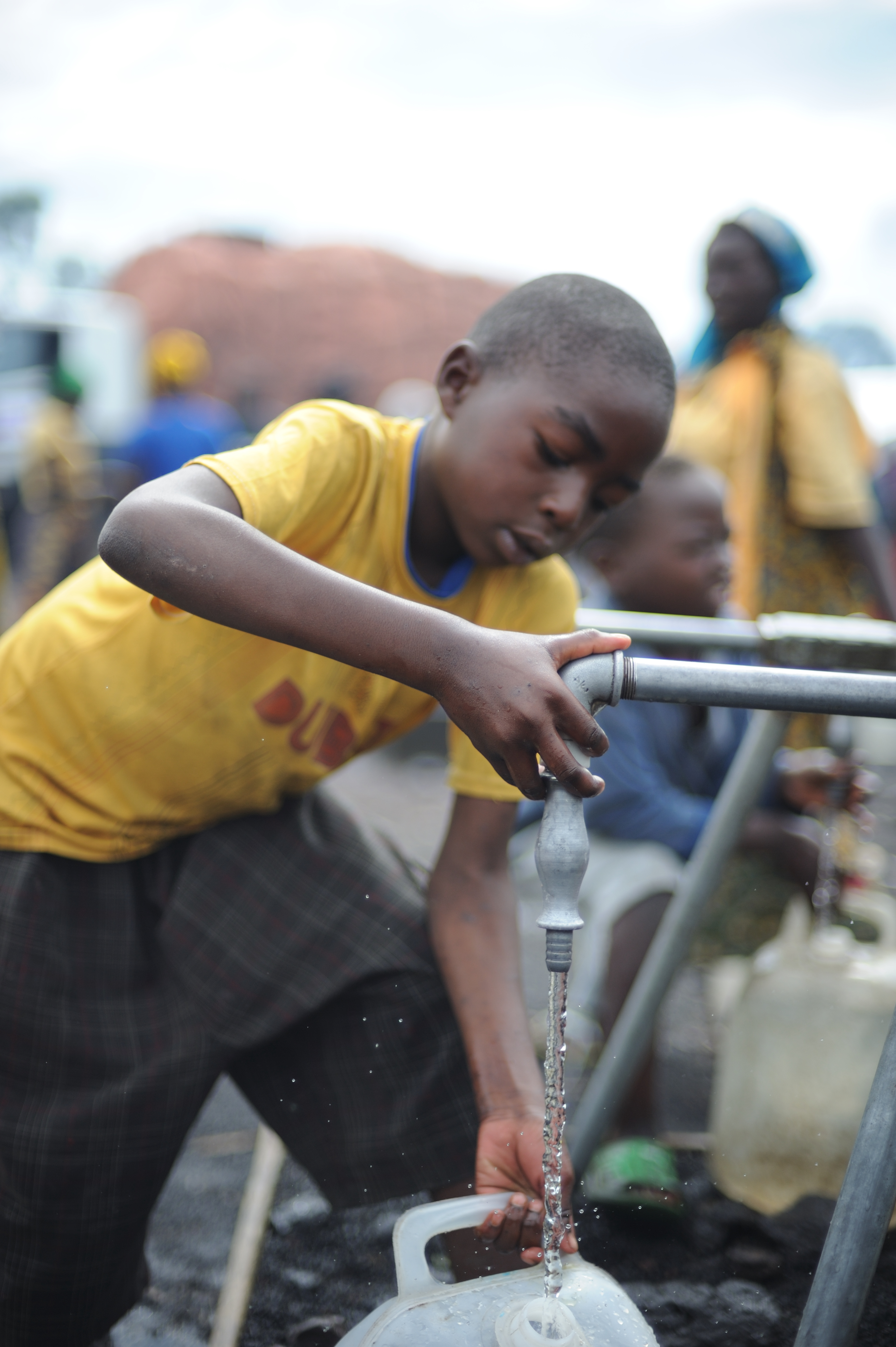
Humanitarian aid in the Democratic Republic of the Congo, 2008

This is an incomplete list of water-related charities - charitable organizations based in North America and Europe working around the world on problems related to water provision, water sanitation, water quality, access to water, and related topics.

== List ==
- Blood: Water Mission Launched first project in 2005. Working to empower communities to fight against HIV/AIDS and the water crisis in Africa.
- CARE Founded in 1945.
- charity: water Founded by 2006 by a former club promoter. Funded by private donors, foundations, and sponsors. Founded on the questionable promise that 100% of donations go directly to the field to fund water projects, such as construction of freshwater wells, rainwater catchments and sand filters.
- Global Water Foundation Founded by Johan Kriek in 2005.
- Global Water Security & Sanitation Partnership Multi-donor partnership administered by the World Bank that works directly with client governments at the local and national level. Their work helps to effect the regulatory and structural changes needed for broad water and sanitation sector reform.
- Initiative: Eau Founded in 2013 by Donald Brooks and Christina Long. Dedicated to strengthening water, sanitation, and hygiene capacity in developing areas and crisis zones. Currently active in Burkina Faso and Senegal.
- International Medical Corps Established in 1984 by volunteer doctors and nurses. As part of its comprehensive approach to health, International Medical Corps prioritizes equitable, reliable access to clean water, the provision/improvement of sanitation facilities, and education of safe hygiene practices.
- Lifewater International Founded in 1977 by William Ashe. Christian-based non-profit, with a focus on addressing the crisis through local communities. Trains volunteer field trainers in shallow well drilling, hand pump repair, biosand filtration, sanitation, community health, and WASH. Focused on long-term change and improved community health.
- Living Water International Founded in 1990. Christian-based and located in Houston, Texas. Train, consult and equip local people to implement clean water solutions in their own countries, specifically with shallow well drilling, pump repair, and hygiene education.
- One Drop is an international non-profit organization created by Cirque du Soleil founder Guy Laliberté, focused on water initiatives.
- Pump Aid-Water for Life Registered in the UK in 1998. UK-based NGO brings a new approach to aid and uses small-business models to work with entrepreneurs and communities so they can reach a point of self-reliance. Winner of International Aid and Development Charity of the year 2017.
- UNICEF - WASH Approved by the UNICEF Executive Board in 2006. Objective is to contribute to the realization of children's rights to survival and development through support of national programmes that increase equitable and sustainable access to safe water.
- Water For People Formed in 1991. Work to provide innovative solutions to water scarcity, while respecting the dignity of local people, using local resources, working with trusted partners, and experimenting with promising new ideas.
- Water is Basic Formed in 2006; Completed first well in 2008. A borehole drilling organization in the Republic of South Sudan birthed and led by Sudanese religious leaders. WiB has drilled over 500 wells and repaired 75 others.
- Water.org Founded as WaterPartners International in 1990. Driving the water sector for new solutions, new financial models, greater transparency, and local partnerships. Encourages community ownership, and selects technology based on local conditions. Works in Africa in Ethiopia, Ghana, Kenya, and Uganda.
- WaterAid Launched in 2009. Work with local partners and influence decision-makers to maximize efforts to improve access to safe water, hygiene and sanitation. Focus on promotion, support to governments and service providers, and advocation.
- WaterCan/EauVive Charter established in 1987. Canadian-based charity that supports small-scale community projects that are sustainable, low-cost and locally appropriate, emphasizes community ownership and self-help, and particularly involves women.
- Water1st International Founded in 2009 in Seattle, Washington, USA by professional water engineer Marla Smith-Nilson. They focus on access to running water at the home. They have completed 5,000 projects; 99% of them are still in operation.
- Wells of Life Started in 2010 out of Orange County, California, this organization provides potable water by drilling wells in Africa - specifically in Uganda. Collaborates with local communities, government officials, and local drilling teams.
- World Vision claims to provide clean water access to a new person every ten seconds. In 2016 alone, 4.6 million received clean water access; 3.3 million with improved hygiene, and 1.6 million with improved sanitation.
- Planet Water Foundation, Started in 2009 by Mark Steele, Founder and CEO (Board Chairman & Director) U.S. based non-profit organization are dedicated to providing clean water to some of the poorest communities by installing community-based water filtration systems and implementing Water-Health and Hygiene educational programs. Their initiatives target schools, children and rural communities of Asia and Latin America, as well as supporting the provision of safe water access following natural disasters. This organization supports over 4.5 million people in 32 different countries.
- Quba Foundation,– Pakistan-based non-profit dedicated to providing sustainable clean water access to underserved communities through the Suqya Water Project, including hand pumps, solar-powered water systems, and hygiene education programs. Targets villages, women, and children to improve health, sanitation, and education outcomes.

== See also ==
- Failures of Water Supply and Sanitation Systems
- End Water Poverty
- Global Water Partnership
- Sanitation and Water for All
- Water issues in developing countries
- Water scarcity in Africa
