= Responses to the Flint water crisis =

Various organizations, private and political, reported on and responded to the water crisis in Flint nationwide. The media attention in Flint spread to encompass infrastructural problems in other cities, and studies on the crisis and its fallout proliferated. Media figures and organizations reported on the crisis extensively, and several called for Governor Rick Snyder's arrest or resignation. The event was described by civil rights advocates as an example of environmental racism.

== Lead poisoning and aging infrastructure problems in other cities ==
An investigative report by Reuters released December 19, 2016, found nearly 3,000 areas in the United States with lead contamination rates at least double those in Flint. The Trump administration blocked publishing a federal health study on the nationwide water-contamination crisis.

The water disaster called attention to the problem of aging and seriously neglected water infrastructure nationwide. The Flint crisis recalled recent lead contamination crises in the tap water in various cities, such as the lead contamination in Washington, D.C. drinking water (2001), Columbia, South Carolina (2005); Durham and Greenville, North Carolina (2006); Jackson, Mississippi (2015); and Sebring, Ohio (2015). The New York Times notes, "Although Congress banned lead water pipes 30 years ago, between 3.3 million and 10 million older ones remain, primed to leach lead into tap water by forces as simple as jostling during repairs or a change in water chemistry." Inadequate regulation was cited as one reason for unsafe lead levels in tap water and "efforts to address shortcomings often encounter push-back from industries like agriculture and mining that fear cost increases, and from politicians ideologically opposed to regulation". The crisis called attention to a "resource gap" for water regulators. The annual budget of the EPA's drinking water office declined 15% from 2006 to 2015, with the office losing over 10% of employees, and the Association of State Drinking Water Administrators reported in 2013 that "federal officials had slashed drinking-water grants, 17 states had cut drinking-water budgets by more than a fifth, and 27 had cut spending on full-time employees", with "serious implications for states' ability to protect public health".

In the aftermath of the water crisis, it was noted that elevated blood-lead levels in children are found in many cities across Michigan, including Detroit, Grand Rapids, Muskegon, and Adrian. Although statewide childhood lead-poisoning rates have dramatically declined since the removal of lead from gasoline, certain areas of the state (particularly low-income areas with older housing stock) continue to experience lead poisoning, mostly from lead paint in homes built before 1978 and lead residue in dust and soil. Lead abatement efforts are slow.

== Reforming the Lead and Copper Rule ==
The water crisis in Flint, Michigan made it apparent that reform needs to be made nationwide to improve water infrastructure. Michigan, as the center of the water crisis, has since strengthened its Lead and Copper Rule. The new Lead and Copper Rule in Michigan requires that all lead contaminated pipes be replaced within the next twenty years. In 2019, the Environmental Protection Agency suggested the first change to the Lead and Copper Rule in almost three decades to set more strict protocols for when lead is identified in water.

After the crisis in Flint, Michigan, Trump's administration created a new set of regulations that would allow states to react more effectively and in a faster manner in the event of a public health crisis. These changes, proposed in amendments to the Lead and Copper Rule, still allow lead water lines to service communities, which has drawn a lot of criticisms from the public. This new proposal highlighted four changes in the Lead and Copper Rule, a rule that previously has not been revised in years. The proposed revisions consist of:

- Requiring water systems to create a database of where the lead pipes are located, and when the water running through the pipes reaches lead levels greater than 15 parts per billion, the problem must be investigated and fixed.
- Creating an alert when water samples reach 10 parts per billion so that communities can determine how to lower the lead levels in the water before it reaches 15 parts per billion.
- Requiring water systems to alert customers within a one-day period if their water sample tests higher than 15 parts per million.
- Requiring water systems to replace water service lines to a home if they are contaminated with lead, and if the homeowner chooses to replace the piping. Every year thereafter, the water system must replace three percent of the lead contaminated water system.

However, critics are calling for the replacement of all lead service lines in communities; a project that would cost billions of dollars, which was not a part of the proposed amendments to the Lead and Copper Rule.

The problem with the current Lead and Copper Rule is that it allows states to test their own water systems. This can cause problems because the water systems in individual homes affect the quality of the water there. Therefore, water pipes could be contaminated and never get tested, or the test results are never reported. Since the crisis in Flint, the Environmental Protection Agency has called for more aggressive replacement of contaminated pipes, as well as improved education so people know to test their water. The crisis in Flint spurred the Natural Resources Defense Council (NRDC) to test water systems across the nation for possible contaminants. The study showed that every state in the country had areas which tested positive for matter that could be harmful to human health.

== Accusations of environmental racism ==
Civil rights advocates characterized the crisis as a result of environmental racism (Flint's population is 56.6% African American per the 2010 census), a term primarily referring to the disproportionate exposure of ethnic minorities to pollution as a result of "poverty and segregation that has relegated many blacks and other racial minorities to some of the most industrialized or dilapidated environments". Columnist Shaun King, for example, wrote that the crisis was "a horrific clash of race, class, politics and public health".

Flint residents themselves have identified racism as a contributing factor to the crisis. In a qualitative study done by The Center for Research on Ethnicity, Culture and Health (CRECH) at the University of Michigan, researchers investigated Flint youth's perceptions of the Flint water crisis. The young Flint residents, with 93% identifying as black, were asked questions regarding the socioeconomic factors that attributed to the crisis. In these interviews, themes of race, genocide, and oppression became apparent as youth expressed opinions on how their "poor Black city" was stigmatized and deprioritized by those in power. While some participants attributed the crisis to intentional ignorance in the face of a stereotype of cities with high crime rates such as Flint, others connected the crisis to an "intentional program of genocide". Regardless of varying dissent, the interviews were notably "emotionally charged", and much of the interviewees posed an idea of internalized oppression. Researchers noted that these results can help academics study the racialized mental trauma and stress among youth who experienced the Flint water crisis.

The Michigan Civil Rights Commission later reiterated this belief in a 138-page report titled "The Flint Water Crisis: Systemic Racism Through the Lens of Flint". Its writers, including Agustin Arbulu, Director of the Michigan Department of Civil Rights, said of it,

Policy makers, government leaders, and decision makers at many levels failed the residents of Flint ... By not challenging their assumptions, by not asking themselves the tough questions about how policy and decisions play out in different communities, especially communities primarily made up of people of color, those decisions and actions – or in some cases, lack of action – led to the tragedy taking place in Flint.

Arthur Horwitz, co-chair of the commission during the time of the investigation, said,

We strongly believe that the actions that led to the poisoning of Flint's water and the slow response resulted in the abridgement of civil rights for the people of Flint ... We are not suggesting that those making decisions related to this crisis were racists, or meant to treat Flint any differently because it is a community of color. Rather, the response is the result of implicit bias and the history of systemic racism that was built into the foundation of Flint. The lessons of Flint are profound. While the exact situation and response that happened in Flint may never happen anywhere else, the factors that led to this crisis remain in place and will most certainly lead to other tragedies if we don't take steps to remedy them. We hope this report is a step in that direction.

The Governor's office responded: "Some findings of the report and the recommendations are similar to those of the (Flint Water Advisory Task Force and) the legislative panel and the Flint Water Interagency Coordinating Committee ... The Governor takes the reporting of each of these panels very seriously, and appreciates the public input that was shared." State Senate Minority Leader Jim Ananich responded, "The presence of racial bias in the Flint water crisis isn't much of a surprise to those of us who live here, but the Michigan Civil Rights Commission's affirmation that the emergency manager law disproportionately hurts communities of color is an important reminder of just how bad the policy is. Now is the time to address this flawed law. ... The people of Flint deserve the same level of safety, opportunity and justice that any other city in Michigan enjoys".

== Media responses ==
On October 8, 2015, the editorial board of the Detroit Free Press wrote that the crisis was "an obscene failure of government" and criticized Snyder.

From December 2015 and for the next two years, reporter Jiquanda Johnson reported on the ins and outs of the water crisis for The Flint Journal, beginning with a report on the preliminary findings of the Flint Water Advisory Task Force on December 30. The experience led Johnson to found Flint Beat to do deeper coverage from the perspectives of the community there.

On December 31, 2015, the editorial board of the MLive group of Michigan newspapers called upon Snyder to "drop executive privilege and release all of his communications on Flint water", establish a procedure for compensating families of children with elevated lead blood levels, and return Flint to local control.

Some of the most important reporting on the crisis was conducted by investigative reporter Curt Guyette, who works not for a news organization but for the American Civil Liberties Union's Michigan Democracy Watch Project. The work of Guyette and the ACLU was credited with bringing the water contamination to public light.

MSNBC host Rachel Maddow has extensively reported on the water crisis on her show since December 2015, keeping it in the national spotlight. She has condemned Snyder's use of emergency managers (which she termed a "very, very radical" change "to the way we govern ourselves as Americans, something that nobody else has done") and said, "The kids of Flint, Michigan have been poisoned by a policy decision." Maddow visited Flint and hosted a town hall with government officials and other involved experts on her show on January 27. On October 5, 2017, Maddow won an Emmy Award for the special.

In February 2018, Jordan Chariton Reports, the YouTube channel and reporting website, released an investigative piece on Truthdig showing that the science and data used to declare the water safe in Flint, Michigan was suspect. This report was later featured on the Thom Hartmann Program.

On April 23, 2019, Status Coup, an independent investigative reporting network co-founded by Jordan Chariton and Jenn Dize, released the documentary Flushing Flint which claimed that the water testing by Michigan Department of Environmental Quality (MDEQ) was falsified by MDEQ staff taking water samples after flushing running water from taps for several minutes before taking the samples, contrary to normal procedures for water testing, and by MDEQ staff telling residents that they should take water samples after flushing running water from their taps for several minutes. This would clearly contravene the U.S. Environmental Protection Agency (EPA) guidance that samples taken must be "first-draw samples at taps in homes/buildings".

On April 16, 2020, an article was published giving details of evidence of corruption and a cover-up by former Governor Rick Snyder and his "fixer" Rich Baird, and stating that the statute of limitations on some of the most serious felony misconduct-in-office charges would expire on April 25, 2020. The article was published by Vice News, written by Jordan Chariton and Jenn Dize, the co-founders of Status Coup, with photos by Brittany Greeson. Responses from Michigan state authorities denied that a deadline was approaching, and said that criminal prosecutions would follow.

== Groups ==
In January 2016, a coalition of local and national groups, including the Natural Resources Defense Council (NRDC), filed suit seeking federal court intervention to secure access to safe drinking water for the people of Flint, Michigan. In November 2016, a federal judge ordered the implementation of door-to-door delivery of bottled water to every home without a properly installed and maintained faucet filter. In March 2018, a settlement was reached that required the city to replace thousands of lead service lines and return to using the predictive model.

In June 2019, the University of Michigan researchers responsible for developing the model, Jake Abernethy and Eric Schwartz, founded BlueConduit, a company aimed at leveraging data science and machine learning to find and remove lead pipes in other municipalities. Retired Brigadier General Michael C. H. McDaniel, who was appointed by Flint Mayor Karen Weaver to serve as program manager for the lead service line replacement programs in Flint, joined BlueConduit as Director of Government and Customer Services.

The watchdog group Common Cause called upon Snyder to release all documents related to the Flint water crisis. The governor's office is not subject to the Michigan Freedom of Information Act.

The hacktivist group Anonymous released a YouTube video calling for the arrest of Snyder.

== Prominent figures ==
Michael Moore, a Genesee County native and director-producer of several movies related to Flint, called for Snyder's arrest for mishandling the water crisis in an open letter to the governor, writing, "The facts are all there, Mr. Snyder. Every agency involved in this scheme reported directly to you. The children of Flint didn't have a choice as to whether or not they were going to get to drink clean water." A spokesman for the governor called Moore's call "inflammatory". Later, after hearing of the Legionnaires' outbreak, Moore termed the state's actions "murder". Speaking to reporters in Flint, he emphasized that "this was not a mistake ... Ten people have been killed here because of a political decision. They did this. They knew." Moore also criticized Barack Obama's trip to Flint, where he drank water, "disappointing".

In a post on her Facebook page, environmental activist Erin Brockovich called the water crisis a "growing national concern" and said that the crisis was "likely" connected to the Legionnaires' disease outbreak. Brockovich called for the U.S. Environment Protection Agency to become involved in the investigation, saying that the EPA's "continued silence has proven deadly".

On January 16, 2016, the Reverend Jesse Jackson met with Mayor Weaver in Flint and said of the crisis, "The issue of water and air and housing and education and violence are all combined. The problem here obviously is more than just lack of drinkable water. We know the problems here and they will be addressed." Jackson called Flint "a disaster zone" and a "crime scene" during a rally at a Flint church the next day. Jackson, in conjunction with the group Concerned Pastors for Social Action, held a major national march in Flint on February 19 to address the water issue, as well as inner city violence and urban reconstruction.

On January 18, Nontombi Naomi Tutu, daughter of Desmond Tutu, said in a speech at the University of Michigan–Flint, "We actually needed the people of Flint to remind the people of this country what happens when political expediency, when financial concerns, overshadow justice and humanity."

On January 24, actor and clean drinking water advocate Matt Damon called for Snyder's resignation.

On March 7, actor Mark Ruffalo, head of the group Water Defense, visited Flint and called for more federal aid in the emergency and Snyder's resignation while saying, "It's an absolute outrage, it's a moral indecency." Water Defense conducted studies on Flint water in the spring of 2016, claiming it is still unsafe for bathing or showering. Their findings were disputed by Virginia Tech water expert Marc Edwards on May 31, 2016.

In the third episode of the Adult Swim comedy series Million Dollar Extreme Presents: World Peace, Charles Carroll (member of the group of YouTube comedians Million Dollar Extreme) delivered a monologue where he described how viewers can recreate the contaminated water in Flint. In his monologue, the right wing-leaning Carroll discussed the concept of tyrannicide with costars Sam Hyde and Andrew Ruse and claims that the situation in Flint is a situation where the violent murder of Republican leadership in the state of Michigan would be justified.

Comedian Steve Harvey made a joke which caused controversy after he got in an argument on The Steve Harvey Morning Show. On it a viewer called in to say that "Cleveland don't deserve jack, and he over there bathing in all that silver water" after the Cleveland Cavaliers NBA team lost in the finals to the Golden State Warriors. Steve Harvey retorted "one more thing. ... Enjoy your nice brown glass of water". The network immediately apologized on air for Harvey's behavior. Following this there was considerable outrage with both Flint mayor Karen Weaver and Little Miss Flint demanding an apology from Steve Harvey. Harvey doubled down on his statement saying it was all in good fun.

On April 28, 2018, Michelle Wolf was the featured entertainer at the White House Correspondents' Dinner. Wolf's last line in her speech was "Flint still doesn't have clean water".

== Education and research ==
During its winter 2016 semester, the University of Michigan–Flint offered a one-credit, eight-session series of public forums dedicated to educating Flint residents and students on the crisis.

The University of Michigan (Ann Arbor) committed to spending $100,000 to research the crisis and possible ways to address it.

Wayne State University in Detroit is leading a separate study with five other schools focusing on the Legionnaires' outbreak called the Flint Area Community Health and Environment Partnership. On October 9, 2017, they released their preliminary analysis, which showed approximately 10 percent of all homes on the Flint municipal water system had chlorine levels less than 0.2 mg/L when measured at the kitchen faucet (bypassing filters when present) after five minutes of flushing.

On August 7, 2017, West Virginia University published a study validating the correlation between the intake of lead contaminated water and the increase of fetal deaths along with miscarriages during November 2013 to March 2015. The study was led jointly by Daniel Grossman of West Virginia University and David Slusky of the University of Kansas. The data was constructed over the course of two years focusing on the city of Flint and how the data differs among neighboring cites in Michigan. Data shows that after the city switched the water source to the Flint River, fetal deaths rose 58% among women aged 15–49 compared to control areas.

=== William Paterson University/University of Wisconsin-Milwaukee Study ===
On November 6, 2017, a retrospective cohort study was published in the Journal of Public Health Policy regarding birth weight outcomes in Flint in the early stages of the water crisis. The study was completed using birth data from 2005 to 2015 to assess the birth weights of infants born before and after the Flint, Michigan, water supply was changed. Low birth weight was defined as a birth weight less than 2,500 grams. Beginning with January 2014 conception dates, the Flint, Michigan, population saw the incidence of low birth weight infants increase from 13.3% to 15.7%. Further analysis, using other counties as controls with similar demographics during the same time period, were then assessed in order to prove these lower birth weights did not happen by chance.

Overall, birth weight in Flint was found to be 48.9 grams less than the control group with a statistically significant 1.53% increase in incidences of low birth weight. The study also analyzed the effects of race in regards to changes in birth weights. White mothers saw a 71-gram reduction in birth weight, resulting in a 2.73% increase in low birth weight infants. There were not any statistically meaningful differences among African American infants. There were likely not enough control counties to properly assess African American birth weights separately. The main limitation of the study was that infants of Flint were compared to infants of other counties. Also, the birth weights after the climax of the crisis were not assessed to see if they bounced back to pre-crisis weights. Increased lead consumption and stress were hypothesized to be reasons behind the increase in low birth weights, but there were likely many additional confounding factors.

=== Wayne State University, Department of Communication Study ===
In a study published in the journal Communication Studies, researchers conducted a survey on the crisis communications methods used during the Flint water contamination by looking at media use between different racial groups. The results were accordant with past research, where racial minorities generally utilized more interpersonal and social connections as informational resources in comparison to their white counterparts. Additionally, the study found that "In almost every category pertaining to health effects and other topics related to the Flint water crisis, African American respondents wanted additional information at higher levels than White respondents." Lastly, researchers found that Instagram was widely used by African-American residents to receive crisis information.

== Other possible causes and responses ==
The crisis highlighted a lack of transparency in Michigan government; the state is one of just two states that exempts the governor's office from state freedom-of-information legislation. A number of commentators framed the crisis in terms of human rights, writing that authorities' handling of the issue denied residents their right to clean water.

Some have framed it as the result of austerity measures and given priority over human life. Jacob Lederman, for example, contends that Flint's poisoned water supply, in addition to high crime rates, devastated schools and crumbling infrastructure, can be attributed to neoliberal economic reforms.

Robby Soave, writing in Reason magazine, said that administrative bloat in public-sector trade unions was to blame for the crisis: "Let's not forget the reason why local authorities felt the need to find a cheaper water source: Flint is broke and its desperately poor citizens can't afford higher taxes to pay the pensions of city government retirees. As recently as 2011, it would have cost every person in Flint $10,000 each to cover the unfunded legacy costs of the city's public employees." Shikha Dalmia wrote in Reason magazine that "Flint was a government-made disaster from top to bottom. Private companies didn't run the system or profit from it".

The crisis brought the National Water Infrastructure Conference to Flint in early March 2017. Michigan Governor Rick Snyder and Flint Mayor Karen Weaver spoke on the first day. Marc Edwards spoke there two days later.

On April 20, 2017, Stephen Estes-Smargiassi, director of planning and sustainability at the Massachusetts Water Resources Authority, told a forum on lead water contamination at the Harvard School of Public Health that a chain-reaction of failures, including those by the financial managers, allowed the water crisis to develop as long as it did. He stated:

What happened in Flint? Well, a firestorm of things that went wrong. [Flint] changed [its] source water, didn't do a good job on corrosion control in their treatment ... They had, about half of the homes had lead service lines. Money was more important to the emergency manager than people were. That's pretty clear from the evidence ... State regulators could have picked up on this, but fell down on the job, maybe worse than that. We'll see what happens to those who were indicted. And the federal regulators could have picked up the problem, but didn't until quite late. All of those things, that firestorm of events, resulted in really awful water quality.
