= Global Water Security & Sanitation Partnership =

World Bank trust fund

- Type: Intergovernmental organisation
- Purpose: Sanitation, hygiene, water supply
- Location: Washington, D. C., United States of America
- Region served: Worldwide, with particular focus on Africa, South Asia, and Latin America
- Key people: Jyoti Shukla, Senior Manager
- Website: wsp.org www.worldbank.org/en/programs/global-water-security-sanitation-partnership

The Global Water Security & Sanitation Partnership (GWSP), formerly the Water and Sanitation Program, is a trust fund administered by the World Bank geared at improving the accessibility and infrastructure of water and sanitation for underdeveloped countries. GWSP works in more than 25 countries through regional offices in Africa, East and South Asia, Latin America, the Caribbean, and an office in Washington, D.C. Heath P. Tarbert is the Acting Executive Director for the United States. The GWSP is best known for its work providing technical assistance, building partnerships and capacity building. GWSP focuses on both regulatory and structural changes and also behavior change projects, such as a scaling up handwashing project and scaling up sanitation project. Another key aspect of GWSP's work is sharing knowledge and best practices through multiple channels. The GWSP has determined five main focus areas: Sustainability, inclusion, institutions, financing, and resilience.

== Activities ==
In addition to other field projects, the program published 108 field notes and technical briefs in 2016. During this year, just under $40 billion US dollars was distributed worldwide, mostly in Africa. The program divides its efforts between the development of sanitation infrastructure and supplies and researching issues impacting the well-being of the communities lacking such facilities.

=== Countries affected ===
==== Africa ====
Country	Project Overview	Projected Cost (USD)	Ref
Benin	Reduce network losses by putting a rehabilitation program and preventative maintenance schedule in place; Direct new finance towards the most poorly-covered areas (Ouémé, Atlantique, and Borgou) to reduce geographical disparities; Secure employment conditions and further train employees working in sanitation	$40mil/year	
Ethiopia	Ending open defecation and improving facilities in public sectors and households; Improved access to clean water; Develop programs to encourage proper disposal of waste and to encourage handwashing	$633.5K/year	
Kenya	Develop and implement a database to monitor coverage/functionality of rural water supply systems; Invest in low-cost sewerage options including small-bore sewerage and decentralized treatment plants; Raise funds for storage/transmission of water to cope with demand and expected population growth	$487mil/year	
Madagascar	Improve fecal disposal; Improve facilities in public sectors and households; Expand sustainable and cost-effective access to water and sanitation	$17.3mil	
Niger	Develop financing strategy within the sanitation and hygiene subsector; Improve facilities in public sectors and households; Develop programs to encourage proper disposal of waste and to encourage handwashing	$40mil/year	
Senegal	Secure more water resources to supply Dakar; Improve the reliability and forecasting of funding allocated by the government from its own budget; Set up a licensing system for entities providing pit emptying services; Improve public and household facilities	$65mil/year	
Tanzania	Bring household surveys in line with international best practice on sanitation; Revisit policy of only using public funds for sewerage expansion in favor a pro-poor approach	125mil/year	

==== East Asia and the Pacific ====
- Bangladesh
- Cambodia
- India
- Indonesia
- Laos
- Pakistan
- Philippines
- Vietnam

==== Latin America ====
- Bolivia
- Ecuador
- Haiti
- Honduras
- Nicaragua
- Peru

=== Other Focus Areas ===
==== Ending open defecation ====
The program has devoted much of its influence to ending open defecation (OD) which affects 1 billion people worldwide and ultimately leading to an estimated 842,000 deaths annually. As part of the RWSP, the WSP began extensive collecting of data in several countries to explore the factors contributing to open defecation in rural areas. The main methodology they have developed is dubbed the SaniFOAM framework. It is focused on identifying the specific practices or attitudes that need to be improved within a community and then finding solutions to influence them to ultimately end open defecation.

==== Rural Water and Sanitation Project (RWSP) ====
The Water and Sanitation Program focused mostly on metropolitan areas. The Rural Water and Sanitation Project focuses mainly on the rural areas that don't have access to the materials that the metropolitan areas do. The RWSP expands the water and sewage infrastructure in areas that only have it in a small part of the country. The project utilizes techniques to shift behavioral habits and sanitation marketing to create a demand for products and services to improve water quality. Beginning in 2006 it was implemented India, Indonesia, and Tanzania. It has now spread to over a dozen countries.

==== Water Partnership Program (WPP) ====
The Water Partnership Program focuses on agricultural use of water. WPP recognizes that 70% of the freshwater is being used for agricultural usage. The WPP is researching into agriculture, and taking steps to preserve fresh water from being exploited for growing crops.

== Methodology ==
=== Sustainability ===
The GWSP has stated that their goal is to promote and help fund private sector initiatives in countries with limited access to water. The reasoning of the GWSP behind promoting development in the private sector is that they claim private water suppliers are able to provide better access with less cost, and that the public sector lacks the resources to improve the access to water. However, there have been criticisms made about the practice of water privatization in developing nations. Some criticisms include how, for the sake of increasing profit for water corporations, these private water suppliers do not do an adequate job of developing infrastructure, and once programs to aid development end, many lower-income households are left without access to inexpensive water.

The GWSP takes steps to ensure the sustainability of water.

- Plan for the future of population growth, urbanization, and climate change
- Infrastructure built to last and be maintained

=== Inclusion ===
The GWSP includes everyone and makes sure not to discriminate anyone from water.

=== Institutions ===
There are set rules that institutes make. GWSP tries to figure out the rules to expand its services.

=== Financing ===
An estimate of US$114 billion per year until 2030 has been made. To reach that goal, the GWSP is taking steps balancing sources of income, making water affordable, and keeping the viability of water is kept up.

=== Resilience ===
Extreme weather, and climate change will effect how the GWSP runs. The steps taken to help slow down the shock is to build buildings that are more resilient to temperature change while still providing water.

== History ==
In an effort to improve upon water and sanitation technology for impoverished nations, the World Bank and United Nations Development Programme (UNDP) founded the program in 1978.

The program and its forebearer UNDP invested most of its efforts to testing cost-effective technologies such as hand pumps and latrines for future implementation in the 1980s. However, as other world governments and organizations began developing systemic solutions and strategies to approach issues regarding safe water and sanitation, the program followed suit in widening its scope of impact.

Beginning in the early 1990s the World Bank Water and Sanitation Program worked on sustainable solutions for communities to provide water for themselves. Their main objectives were to create systems that could stay in operation and help the communities be independent. By the end of the decade the program divided its efforts into both field projects and research and evaluation of the world's water systems and practices.

== Donors ==
The program is funded by several countries including Australia, Austria, Canada, Denmark, Finland, France, Ireland, Luxembourg, Netherlands, Norway, Sweden, Switzerland, United Kingdom, and United States, as well as by the Bill & Melinda Gates Foundation.

== See also ==
- WASH
- Human right to water and sanitation
- Water issues in developing countries
