= Joseph Potter =

Joseph or Joe Potter may refer to:

- Joseph H. Potter (1822–1892), general in the Union Army during the American Civil War
- Joseph Potter (architect) (1756–1842), English architect and builder
- William Everett Potter (1905–1988), known as Joe, U.S. Army general, Governor of the Panama Canal Zone and Disney Legend
- Joseph E. Potter (1946–2024), American sociologist
- Joseph Potter (cricketer) (1839–1906), English cricketer
- Joseph Potter (actor), British actor
- Joe Potter (curler), see Ontario Curling Association

== See also ==
- Joey Potter, female fictional character in Dawson's Creek
- Jo Potter (born 1984), female footballer
- Joe Potter, a character from the Black Mirror television episode White Christmas
