= Texas Policy Evaluation Project =

Collaborative research group in Texas

The Texas Policy Evaluation Project, or TxPEP, is a collaborative group of university-based investigators who evaluate the impact of legislation in Texas related to women's reproductive health. It began in the fall of 2011 with the purpose of documenting and evaluating the impact of reproductive health legislation passed by the 82nd Texas Legislature. Those measures included large cuts to state family planning funding programs in the 2012–2013 budget as well as changes in the eligibility of organizations to participate in those programs, and Texas House Bill 15, a law requiring that women undergo a mandatory sonogram at least 24 hours before an abortion.

Their evaluation work continued after the 83rd Texas Legislature in 2013, when the legislature added funding streams for family planning to the 2014–15 budget and passed Texas House Bill 2, an omnibus bill restricting abortion care that was introduced in a special legislative session in summer 2013. HB 2 placed limits on medication abortion, banned abortion ≥20 weeks “post-fertilization,” and required abortion providers to have hospital admitting privileges and abortion facilities to meet the standards of ambulatory surgical centers (ASCs). In June 2016, the US Supreme Court struck down the admitting privileges and ASC requirements in HB 2, citing TxPEP research findings in its ruling.

The project continues to publish peer-reviewed journal articles on topics such as family planning, contraceptive counseling, abortion, judicial bypass for abortion, and more.

Researchers working on the project are affiliated with multiple institutions, including the University of Texas at Austin Population Research Center, the University of California San Francisco, and Ibis Reproductive Health.

== Researchers ==
Researchers involved with TxPEP include:

- Joseph E. Potter, a professor of sociology and Population Research Center research associate at the University of Texas at Austin.
- Daniel Grossman, a professor of obstetrics, gynecology, and reproductive sciences at the Bixby Center for Global Reproductive Health at University of California San Francisco.
- Kristine Hopkins, a research assistant professor and Population Research Center research associate at the University of Texas at Austin.
- Kari White, an assistant professor in the Department of Health Care Organization and Policy at the University of Texas at Austin.

Additional researchers can be found on the "Researchers" page of the TxPEP website.

== Studies ==
The TxPEP research agenda includes studying the impact of the Supreme Court decision on abortion access in Texas, the effects of Texas House Bill 3994 in restricting judicial bypass for teens seeking abortion care without parental consent, as well as the impact of the new and reorganized state family planning programs and the Medicaid rule change permitting reimbursement for immediate postpartum provision of long-acting reversible contraception.

On November 17, 2015, TxPEP released a study that found that at least 100,000 Texas women between the ages of 18 and 49, and possibly as many as 240,000, had attempted to self-induce abortions at some point in their lives. On March 17, 2016, another study conducted by TxPEP researchers was published in the American Journal of Public Health. found that after HB 2 became law and some abortion clinics closed, women whose nearest clinic closed traveled on average 85 miles each way, compared to 22 miles each way for women whose nearest clinic did not close, and that women whose clinics closed were also more likely to spend more time obtaining an abortion.

== Publication List ==
Baum, S. E., White, K., Hopkins, K., Potter, J. E., & Grossman, D. (2016). Women's experience obtaining abortion care in Texas after implementation of restrictive abortion laws: a qualitative study. PLOS ONE, 11(10), e0165048.

Baum, S. E., White, K., Hopkins, K., Potter, J. E., & Grossman, D. (2019). Rebound of medication abortion in Texas following updated mifepristone label. Contraception. https://doi.org/10.1016/j.contraception.2019.01.001

Coleman-Minahan, K., Aiken, A. R., & Potter, J. E. (2017). Prevalence and predictors of prenatal and postpartum contraceptive counseling in two Texas cities. Women's Health Issues, 27(6), 707–714. https://doi.org/10.1016/j.whi.2017.05.004

Coleman‐Minahan, K., Dillaway, C. H., Canfield, C., Kuhn, D. M., Strandberg, K. S., & Potter, J. E. (2018). Low‐Income Texas Women's Experiences Accessing Their Desired Contraceptive Method at the First Postpartum Visit. Perspectives on sexual and reproductive health, 50(4), 189–198. https://doi.org/10.1363/psrh.12083

Coleman-Minahan, K., Stevenson, A. J., Obront, E., & Hays, S. (2019). Young women's experiences obtaining judicial bypass for abortion in Texas. Journal of Adolescent Health, 64(1), 20–25. https://doi.org/10.1016/j.jadohealth.2018.07.017

Fuentes, L., Lebenkoff, S., White, K., Gerdts, C., Hopkins, K., Potter, J. E., & Grossman, D. (2016). Women's experiences seeking abortion care shortly after the closure of clinics due to a restrictive law in Texas. Contraception, 93(4), 292–297. http://doi.org/10.1016/j.contraception.2015.12.017

Gerdts, C., Fuentes, L., Grossman, D., White, K., Keefe-Oates, B., Baum, S., Hopkins, K., Stolp C. W., Potter, J. E. (2016). The impact of clinic closures on women obtaining abortion services after implementation of a restrictive law in Texas. American Journal of Public Health, 106(5), 857–864. https://doi.org/10.2105/AJPH.2016.303134

Goyal, V., Canfield, C., Aiken, A. R., Dermish, A., & Potter, J. E. (2017). Postabortion contraceptive use and continuation when long-acting reversible contraception is free. Obstetrics and gynecology, 129(4), 655.

Grossman, D., Baum, S., Fuentes, L., White, K., Hopkins, K., Stevenson, A. J., & Potter, J. E. (2014). Change in abortion services after implementation of a restrictive law in Texas. Contraception, 90(5), 496–501. http://doi.org/10.1016/j.contraception.2014.07.006

Grossman, D., White, K., Hopkins, K., & Potter, J. E. (2014). The public health threat of anti-abortion legislation. Contraception, 89(2), 73–4. http://doi.org/10.1016/j.contraception.2013.10.012

Grossman, D., White, K., Hopkins, K., & Potter, J. E. (2017). Change in distance to nearest facility and abortion in Texas, 2012 to 2014. Jama, 317(4), 437–439.

Hendrick, C. E., & Potter, J. E. (2017). Nativity, Country of Education, and Mexican‐Origin Women's Breastfeeding Behaviors in the First 10 Months Postpartum. Birth, 44(1), 68–77. https://doi.org/10.1111/birt.12261

Hopkins, K., Hubert, C., Coleman-Minahan, K., Stevenson, A. J., White, K., Grossman, D., & Potter, J. E. (2018). Unmet demand for short-acting hormonal and long-acting reversible contraception among community college students in Texas. Journal of American College Health, 66(5), 360–368. https://doi.org/10.1080/07448481.2018.1431901

Hopkins, K., White, K., Linkin, F., Hubert, C., Grossman, D., & Potter, J. E. (2015). Women's experiences seeking publicly funded family planning services in Texas. Perspectives on Sexual and Reproductive Health, 47(2), 63–70. http://doi.org/10.1363/47e2815

Potter, J. E., Coleman-Minahan, K., White, K., Powers, D. A., Dillaway, C., Stevenson, A. J., ... & Grossman, D. (2017). Contraception after delivery among publicly insured women in Texas: use compared with preference. Obstetrics and gynecology, 130(2), 393.

Potter, J. E., Hopkins, K., Aiken, A. R. A., Hubert, C., Stevenson, A. J., White, K., & Grossman, D. (2014). Unmet demand for highly effective postpartum contraception in Texas. Contraception, 90(5), 488–95. http://doi.org/10.1016/j.contraception.2014.06.039

Potter, J. E., Hubert, C., Stevenson, A. J., Hopkins, K., Aiken, A. R. A., White, K., & Grossman, D. (2016). Barriers to postpartum contraception in Texas and pregnancy within 2 years of delivery. Obstetrics & Gynecology, 127(2), 289–296. http://doi.org/10.1097/AOG.0000000000001201

Potter, J. E., Hubert, C., & White, K. (2017). The availability and use of postpartum LARC in Mexico and among Hispanics in the United States. Maternal and child health journal, 21(9), 1744–1752. https://doi.org/10.1007/s10995-016-2179-6

Potter, J. E., Stevenson, A. J., Coleman-Minahan, K., Hopkins, K., White, K., Baum, S. E., & Grossman, D. (2019). Challenging unintended pregnancy as an indicator of reproductive autonomy. Contraception. https://doi.org/10.1016/j.contraception.2019.02.005

Stevenson, A. J. (2014). Finding the Twitter users who stood with Wendy. Contraception, 90(5), 502–507. http://doi.org/10.1016/j.contraception.2014.07.007

Stevenson, A. J., Flores-Vazquez, I. M., Allgeyer, R. L., Schenkkan, P., & Potter, J. E. (2016). Effect of removal of Planned Parenthood from the Texas Women's Health Program. New England Journal of Medicine, 374(9), 853–860. http://doi.org/10.1056/NEJMsa1511902

White, K., Adams, K., & Hopkins, K. (2019). Counseling and referrals for women with unplanned pregnancies at publicly funded family planning organizations in Texas. Contraception, 99(1), 48–51. https://doi.org/10.1016/j.contraception.2018.09.006

White, K., Baum, S. E., Hopkins, K., Potter, J. E., & Grossman, D. (2019). Change in Second-Trimester Abortion After Implementation of a Restrictive State Law. Obstetrics & Gynecology, 133(4), 771–779.

White, K., Campbell, A., Hopkins, K., Grossman, D., & Potter, J. E. (2017). Barriers to Offering Vasectomy at Publicly Funded Family Planning Organizations in Texas. American journal of men's health, 11(3), 757–766. https://doi.org/10.1177%2F1557988317694296

White, K., Carroll, E., & Grossman, D. (2015). Complications from first-trimester aspiration abortion: a systematic review of the literature. Contraception, 92(5), 422–438. http://doi.org/10.1016/j.contraception.2015.07.013

White, K., Grossman, D., Hopkins, K., & Potter, J. E. (2012). Cutting family planning in Texas. New England Journal of Medicine, 367(13), 1179–1181. http://doi.org/10.1056/Nejmp1207920

White, K., Grossman, D., Stevenson, A. J., Hopkins, K., & Potter, J. E. (2017). Does information about abortion safety affect Texas voters' opinions about restrictive laws? A randomized study. Contraception, 96(6), 381–387. https://doi.org/10.1016/j.contraception.2017.08.007

White, K., Hopkins, K., Aiken, A. R. A., Stevenson, A. J., Hubert, C., Grossman, D., & Potter, J. E. (2015). The impact of reproductive health legislation on family planning clinic services in Texas. American Journal of Public Health, 105(5), 851–8. http://doi.org/10.2105/AJPH.2014.302515

White, K., Hopkins, K., Grossman, D., & Potter, J. E. (2018). Providing family planning services at primary care organizations after the exclusion of Planned Parenthood from publicly funded programs in Texas: early qualitative evidence. Health services research, 53, 2770–2786. https://doi.org/10.1111/1475-6773.12783

White, K., Potter, J. E., Stevenson, A. J., Fuentes, L., Hopkins, K., & Grossman, D. (2016). Women's knowledge of and support for abortion restrictions in Texas: findings from a statewide representative survey. Perspectives on Sexual and Reproductive Health, 48(4). http://doi.org/10.1363/48e8716

Woo, C. J., Alamgir, H., & Potter, J. E. (2016). Women's experiences after Planned Parenthood's exclusion from a family planning program in Texas. Contraception, 93(4), 298–302. http://doi.org/10.1016/j.contraception.2015.12.004
