= Sanitation and Water for All =

Global partnership organization

- Abbreviation: SWA
- Formation: 2010
- Type: Partnership
- Purpose: Sanitation, hygiene, water supply
- Chair: Kevin Rudd
- Executive Chair: Catarina de Albuquerque
- Website: sanitationandwaterforall.org

The Sanitation and Water for All (SWA) is a global partnership committed to achieving universal access to clean drinking water and adequate sanitation. In 2015, 2.4 billion people lacked access to improved sanitation, 946 million people defecate in the open and 663 million people lack access to basic water sources.

Over 100 partners, including governments, civil society and development partners, work together as part of SWA.

The SWA Partnership organizes meetings called "High Level Meetings" (HLM). After two HLM in 2010 and 2012, the third HLM took place in Washington, D.C., in April 2014, with over sixty delegations from developing countries and donors, including 20 finance ministers from SWA partner countries.

SWA's communications team was hosted by the Water Supply and Sanitation Collaborative Council (WSSCC) until the end of 2019. From 2020 onwards, it is being hosted by UNICEF.

== Partnership ==
SWA's partners are categorized into six different constituencies. Each constituency is represented on the steering committee, which holds decision-making authority for the partnership.

SWA has the following partner categories:

- Government partners (governments that are supporting their own domestic implementation of the objectives of SWA)
- External Support Agencies (multilateral partners, donor partners and development banks)
- Civil Society (non-profit organizations or networks active at national, international or regional levels)
- Research and Learning (academic institutions or agencies or networks with recognized technical and policy expertise and influence, and global and/or regional remit, undertaking or promoting research or learning in support of SWA objectives)
- Private sector (for-profit businesses or networks representing business constituencies with recognized commitment, influence and global and/or regional remit that work in support of SWA's objectives),
- Utilities and Regulators (at national level, influencing policy, linking government and WASH users, and enabling financing).

== History ==
A number of water and sanitation stakeholders first conceptualised SWA in 2006 to improve access to sanitation and drinking water.

In 2007, DFID reiterated its call for a better WASH sector coordination and the need for a Global Action Plan based “Five Ones”:

1. one annual global monitoring report;
2. one high level global Ministerial Meeting on water;
3. at country level, one national plan for water and sanitation;
4. one coordinating body;
5. and activities of the United Nations (UN) agencies in water and sanitation to be coordinated by one lead UN body under the UNDP country plan.

In 2008, DFID, the Dutch Directorate-General for International Cooperation (DGIS), other donors and developing country governments officially agreed to create a Global Framework for Action on Sanitation and Water Supply (GF4A), which was launched at a side-event during the UN MDG High-Level Event.

In April 2010, the partners organized the first high-level meeting in Washington, D.C., US, and developing countries and donors tabled commitments to improve sanitation and water. In September 2010, under a new name – Sanitation and Water for All (SWA) – the new partnership was formalized with an agreed governing document, an elected steering committee and a secretariat.

== See also ==
- WASH
- Human right to water and sanitation
- Water issues in developing countries
