= Daniel Grossman (physician) =

American obstetrician, gynecologist, and medical researcher

Daniel Grossman is an American obstetrician, gynecologist, and medical researcher. He is a professor in the Department of Obstetrics, Gynecology & Reproductive Sciences at the University of California, San Francisco, where he is also the director of the collaborative research group Advancing New Standards in Reproductive Health (ANSIRH). He is also an investigator for the Texas Policy Evaluation Project (TxPEP) and a senior advisor at Ibis Reproductive Health. In 2013, he received the Felicia Stewart Advocacy Award from the American Public Health Association.

== Education and career ==
Grossman received his B.S. from Yale University and his M.D. from Stanford University. He later completed his residency in obstetrics and gynecology at the University of California, San Francisco. In 2005, he left the Population Council, where he had been working in Mexico City as their Health Specialist, to work for Ibis. He later became Ibis' vice president for research before leaving this position to become the director of ANSIRH.

== Research ==
Grossman's most recent research mainly focuses on access to contraception and safe abortion. For example, through his work with the Texas Policy Evaluation Project, he has studied changes in abortion access and rates of self-induced abortions in Texas after the state passed Texas Senate Bill 5, a restrictive abortion law, in 2013. He later served as a key witness in Whole Woman's Health v. Hellerstedt, the 2016 Supreme Court case regarding the constitutionality of the law. In 2017, he published another study on the law's effects which showed that the law reduced the abortion rate in rural parts of the state by almost half, while having little effect on the abortion rate in either urban areas or areas where the distance to the nearest clinic did not change significantly.
