= Jiquanda Johnson =

American journalist

Jiquanda Johnson (born 1976) is an American journalist who founded Flint Beat in Flint, Michigan in 2017 and reported on, among other things, the Flint water crisis. The site has become important for national news organizations and community members, which use her reporting and Flint Beat to chronicle the long-term effects and historical conditions in Flint related to the crisis.

== Career ==
Johnson is a Michigan native who reported on the Flint water crisis and many other issues for Detroit News, Flint Journal and NBC News. Johnson is currently the CEO of Brown Impact Media Group, an independent media company she founded in 2014, and sits on the board of directors as vice president for East Lansing Info, a local newsroom covering East Lansing, Michigan.

=== Flint Beat ===
Johnson's career as a journalist began in 2002 with The Detroit News, before moving to the Flint Journal and, later, Flint Beat. She talked about the founding and growth of Flint Beat on the PBS program "The Follow Up" in 2019, talking about the news gaps in Flint that drove her to launch the site, and how community was at the heart of creating Flint Beat. "They're not voiceless," she said in an interview with the Poynter Institute, "They just don't have a platform. Flint Beat is that platform."

In interviews, Johnson has said it's challenging to report on her own community where she grew up and has recounted her own daughter's exposure to lead in Flint's water, as well as to gun violence, as challenges. Additional challenges that Johnson has faced with Flint Beat as a startup newsroom is a lack of funding; while she struggled with funding the newsroom in its first few years, the newsroom had "record breaking" fundraising years in 2020 and 2021, with additional support from programs like Report for America.

In 2021, Flint Beat won the "News Media Publication of the Year" award from the Michigan Press Association.

=== News Movement ===
Following the creation of Flint Beat, Johnson developed an educational program, News Movement, to train students in reporting practices and journalism. The after-school and summer camp program, for youth in North Flint, is grant-funded by the Ruth Mott Foundation and housed at the Sylvester Broome Empowerment Village.

== Facebook censorship ==
In 2018, Johnson came into national spotlight as a journalist whose posts about racism were removed by Facebook. She had posted images of the aftermath of her father's truck being vandalized with racial slurs and having its tires slashed, before her posts were removed from the site and she faced a temporary ban.

The company reversed course and apologized following the harassment Johnson faced as well as the outcry online after she revealed the ban; Johnson maintains it was due to her being a journalist, "noting that people in her professional network knocked on Facebook's virtual door about this action."
