= Water issues in developing countries =

Water issues and problems in developing countries are diverse and serious

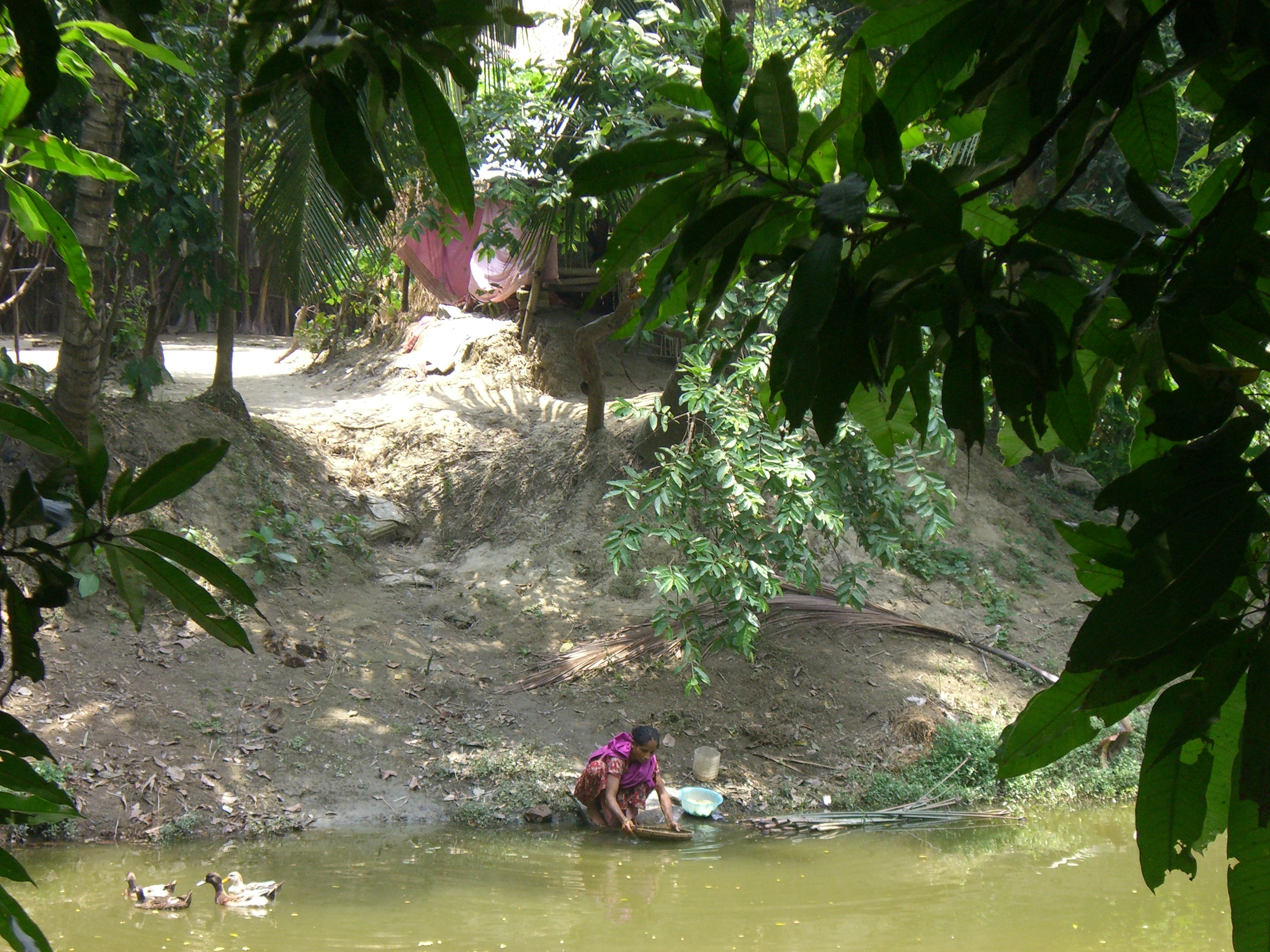
A woman washing dishes at the water's edge in a Bangladeshi village

Over one billion people in developing countries have inadequate access to clean water. Issues include scarcity of drinking water, poor infrastructure for water and sanitation access, water pollution, and low levels of water security. The main barriers to addressing water problems in developing nations include poverty, costs of infrastructure, and poor governance. The effects of climate change on the water cycle can make these problems worse.

The contamination of water remains a significant issue because of unsanitary social practices that pollute water sources. Almost 80% of disease in developing countries is caused by poor water quality and other water-related issues that cause deadly health conditions such as cholera, malaria, and diarrhea. It is estimated that diarrhea takes the lives of 1.5 million children every year, majority of whom are under the age of five.

Access to freshwater is unevenly distributed across the globe, with more than two billion people living in countries with significant water stress. According to UN-Water, by 2025, 1.8 billion people will be living in areas across the globe with complete water scarcity. Populations in developing countries attempt to access potable water from a variety of sources, such as groundwater, aquifers, or surface waters, which can be easily contaminated. Freshwater access is also constrained by insufficient wastewater and sewage treatment. Progress has been made over recent decades to improve water access, but billions still live in conditions with very limited access to consistent and clean drinking water.

== Problems ==
=== Water scarcity ===
People need fresh water for survival, personal care, agriculture, industry, and commerce. The 2019 UN World Water Development report noted that about four billion people, representing nearly two-thirds of the world population, experience severe water scarcity during at least one month of the year. With rising demand, the quality and supply of water have diminished.

Water use has been increasing worldwide by about 1% per year since the 1980s. Global water demand is expected to continue increasing at a similar rate until 2050, accounting for an increase of 20–30% above 2019 usage levels. The steady rise in use has principally been led by surging demand in developing countries and emerging economies. Per capita water use in the majority of these countries remains far below water use in developed countries—they are merely catching up.

Agriculture (including irrigation, livestock, and aquaculture) is by far the largest water consumer, accounting for 69% of annual water withdrawals globally. Agriculture's share of total water use is likely to fall in comparison with other sectors, but it will remain the largest user overall in terms of both withdrawal and consumption. Industry (including power generation) accounts for 19% and households for 12%.

Water scarcity (closely related to water stress or water crisis) is the lack of any, local or economically viably transportable, sources of fresh water resources to meet the standard water demand in a region. There are two types of water scarcity. One is physical. The other is economic water scarcity. Physical water scarcity is where there is not enough water to meet all demands. This includes water needed for ecosystems to function. Regions with a desert climate often face physical water scarcity. Central Asia, West Asia, North Africa, and most of Australia are examples of arid areas. Economic water scarcity results from a lack of investment in infrastructure or technology to draw usable water from rivers, aquifers, and other water sources. It also results from weak human capacity to meet water demand. Many people in sub-Saharan Africa are living with economic water scarcity.

There is and has always been enough physical supply of freshwater for current or near or distant future demand in a global scale. As such, water scarcity is caused by a mismatch between when and where people need water, and when and where it is available. This can happen due to an increase in the number of people in a region, changing living conditions and diets, and expansion of irrigated agriculture. Climate change (including droughts or floods), deforestation, water pollution and wasteful use of water can also mean there is not enough water. These variations in scarcity may also be a function of prevailing economic policy and planning approaches.

Water scarcity assessments look at many types of information. They include green water (soil moisture), water quality, environmental flow requirements, and virtual water trade. Water stress is one parameter to measure water scarcity. It is useful in the context of Sustainable Development Goal 6. Half a billion people live in areas with severe water scarcity throughout the year, and around four billion people face severe water scarcity at least one month per year. Half of the world's largest cities experience water scarcity. There are 2.3 billion people who reside in nations with water scarcities (meaning less than 1700 m^{3} of water per person per year).

=== Water pollution ===
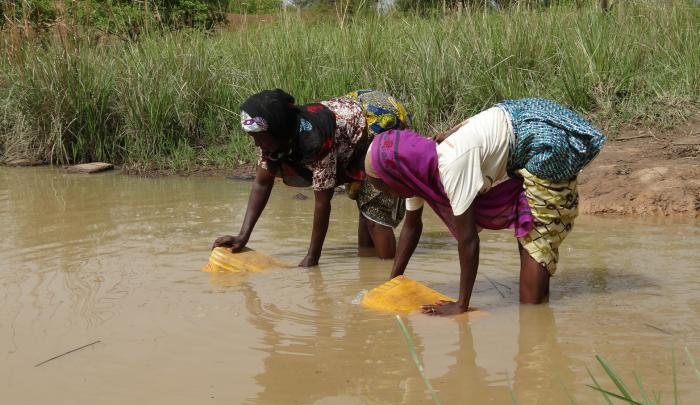
Women fetching polluted water in Ghana

After accounting for availability or access, water quality can reduce the amount of water for consumption, sanitation, agriculture, and industrial purposes. Acceptable water quality depends on its intended purpose: water that is unfit for human consumption could still be used in industrial or agriculture applications. Parts of the world are experiencing extensive deterioration of water quality, rendering the water unfit for agricultural or industrial use. For example, in China, 54% of the Hai River basin surface water is so polluted that it is considered un-usable.

Safe water is defined as potable water that will not harm the consumer. It is one of the eight Millennium Development Goals: between 1990 and 2015 to "reduce by half the proportion of the population without sustainable access to safe drinking water and basic sanitation." Even having access to an 'improved water source' does not guarantee the water's quality, as it could lack proper treatment and become contaminated during transport or home storage. A study by the World Health Organization (WHO) found that estimates of safe water could be overestimated if accounting for water quality, especially if the water sources were poorly maintained.

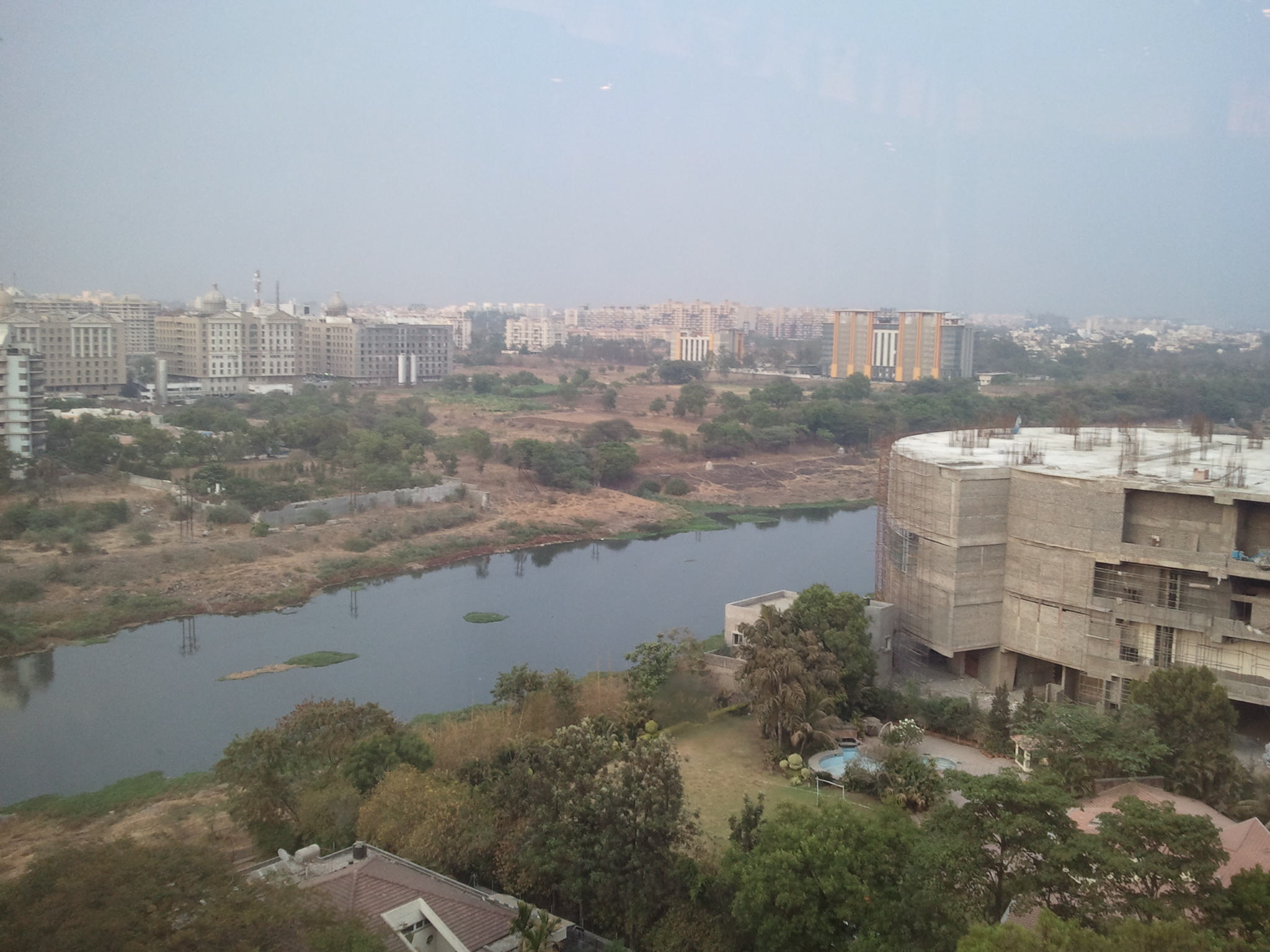
Runoff from development along the river in Pune, India could contribute to reduced water quality.

Polluted drinking water can lead to debilitating or deadly water-borne diseases, such as fever, cholera, dysentery, diarrhea and others. UNICEF cites fecal contamination and high levels of naturally occurring arsenic and fluoride as two of the world's major water quality concerns. Approximately 71% of all illnesses in developing countries are caused by poor water and sanitation conditions. Worldwide, contaminated water leads to 4,000 diarrhea deaths a day in children under 5.

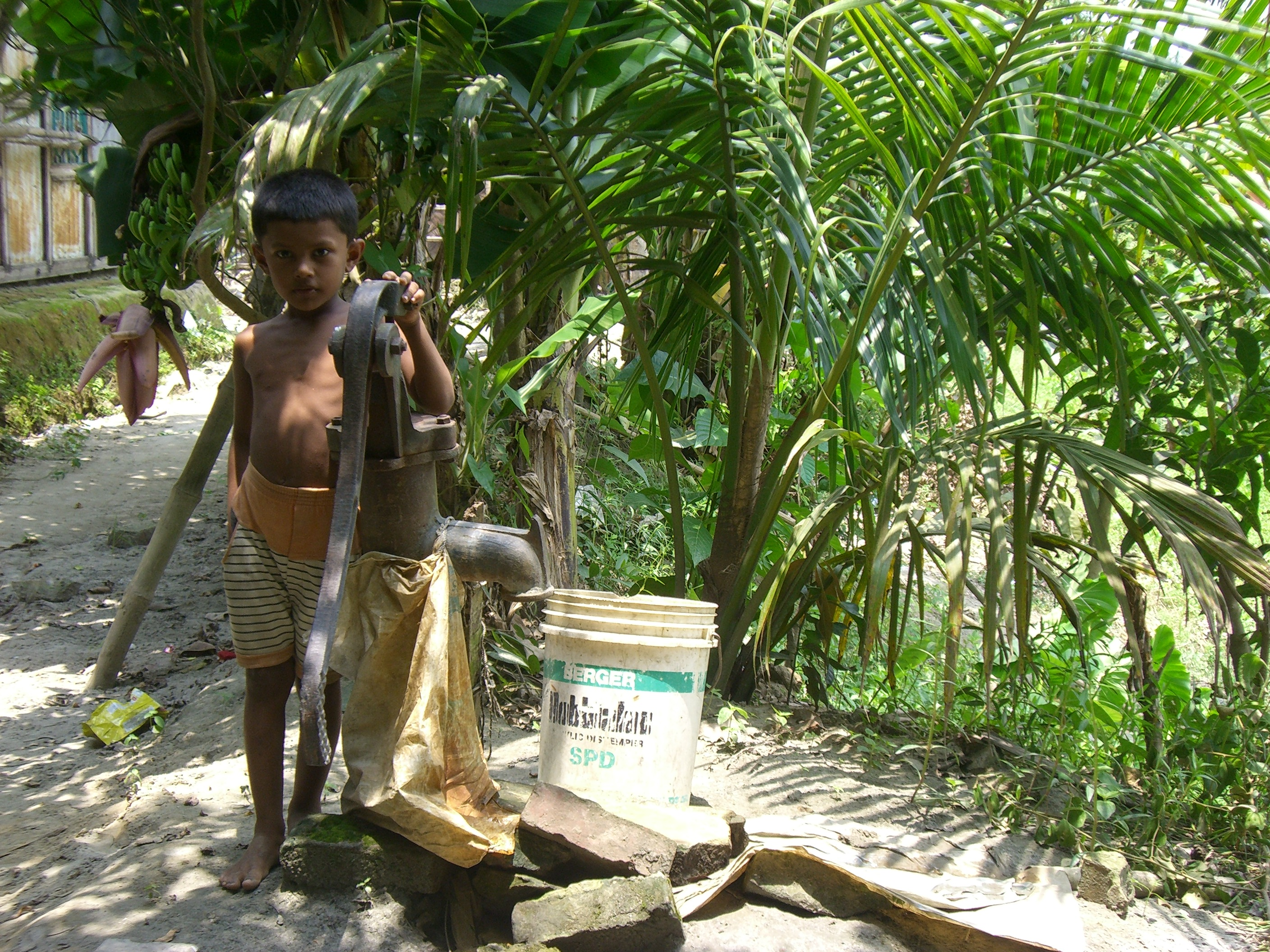
Child standing next to a well pump in a Bangladeshi Village. Many such wells have naturally high levels of arsenic.

However, gaps in wastewater treatment (the amount of wastewater to be treated is greater than the amount that is actually treated) represent the most significant contribution to water pollution and water quality deterioration. In the majority of the developing world, most of the collected wastewater is returned to surface waters directly without treatment, reducing the water's quality. In China, only 38% of China's urban wastewater is treated, and although 91% of China's industrial waste water is treated, it still releases extensive toxins into the water supply.

The amount of possible wastewater treatment can also be compromised by the networks required to bring the wastewater to the treatment plants. It is estimated that 15% of China's wastewater treatment facilities are not being used to capacity due to a limited pipe network to collect and transport wastewater. In São Paulo, Brazil, a lack of sanitation infrastructure results in the pollution of the majority of its water supply and forces the city to import over 50% of its water from outside watersheds. Polluted water increases a developing country's operating costs, as lower quality water is more expensive to treat. In Brazil, polluted water from the Guarapiranga Reservoir costs $0.43 per m^{3} to treat to usable quality, compared to only $0.10 per m^{3} for water coming from the Cantareira Mountains.

Water pollution (or aquatic pollution) is the contamination of water bodies, which has a negative impact on how they can be used. It is usually caused by human activities. Water bodies include lakes, rivers, oceans, aquifers, reservoirs and groundwater. Water pollution results when contaminants mix with these water bodies. Contaminants can come from one of four main sources. These are sewage discharges, industrial activities, agricultural activities, and urban runoff including stormwater. Water pollution may affect either surface water or groundwater. This form of pollution can lead to many problems. One is the degradation of aquatic ecosystems. Another is spreading water-borne diseases when people use polluted water for drinking or irrigation. Water pollution also reduces the ecosystem services such as drinking water provided by the water resource.

Sources of water pollution are either point sources or non-point sources. Point sources have one identifiable cause, such as a storm drain, a wastewater treatment plant, or an oil spill. Non-point sources are more diffuse. An example is agricultural runoff. Pollution is the result of the cumulative effect over time. Pollution may take many forms. One would be toxic substances such as oil, metals, plastics, pesticides, persistent organic pollutants, and industrial waste products. Another is stressful conditions such as changes of pH, hypoxia or anoxia, increased temperatures, excessive turbidity, or changes of salinity). The introduction of pathogenic organisms is another. Contaminants may include organic and inorganic substances. A common cause of thermal pollution is the use of water as a coolant by power plants and industrial manufacturers.

=== Water security ===
The aim of water security is to maximize the benefits of water for humans and ecosystems. The second aim is to limit the risks of destructive impacts of water to an acceptable level. These risks include too much water (flood), too little water (drought and water scarcity), and poor quality (polluted) water. People who live with a high level of water security always have access to "an acceptable quantity and quality of water for health, livelihood, and production". For example, access to water, sanitation, and hygiene services is one part of water security. Some organizations use the term "water security" more narrowly, referring only to water supply aspects.

Decision makers and water managers aim to reach water security goals that address multiple concerns. These outcomes can include increasing economic and social well-being while reducing risks tied to water. There are linkages and trade-offs between the different outcomes. Planners often consider water security effects for varied groups when they design climate change reduction strategies.

== Managing water safety ==
To address water scarcity, organizations have focused on increasing the supply of fresh water, mitigating its demand, and enabling reuse and recycling.

=== Clean water plans ===
According to the WHO, consistent access to a safe drinking-water supply is attainable by establishing a system of WSPs, or Water Safety Plans, which determine the quality of water supplies to ensure they are safe for consumption. The Water Safety Plan Manual, published in 2009 by the WHO and the International Water Association, offers guidance to water utilities (or similar entities) as they develop WSPs. This manual provides information to help water utilities assess their water systems, develop monitoring systems and procedures, manage their plans, carry out periodic reviews of the WSP, and to review the WSPs following incidents. The WSP manual also includes three case studies drawn from WSP initiatives in three countries/regions.

=== Alternative sources ===
Utilizing wastewater from one process to be used in another process where lower-quality water is acceptable is one way to reduce the amount of wastewater pollution and simultaneously increase water supplies. Recycling and reuse techniques can include the reuse and treatment of wastewater from industrial plant wastewater or treated service water (from mining) for use in lower quality uses. Similarly, wastewater can be re-used in commercial buildings (e.g. in toilets) or for industrial applications (e.g. for industrial cooling).

=== Reducing water pollution ===
Despite the clear benefits of improving water sources (a WHO study showed a potential economic benefit of $3–34 USD for every US$1 invested), aid for water improvements have declined from 1998 to 2008 and generally is less than is needed to meet the MDG targets. In addition to increasing funding resources towards water quality, many development plans stress the importance of improving policy, market and governance structures to implement, monitor and enforce water quality improvements.

Reducing the amount of pollution emitted from both point and non-point sources represents a direct method to address the source of water quality challenges. Pollution reduction represents a more direct and low-cost method to improve water quality, compared to costly and extensive wastewater treatment improvements.

Various policy measures and infrastructure systems could help limit water pollution in developing countries. These include:

1. Improved management, enforcement and regulation for pre-treatment of industrial and agricultural waste, including charges for pollution
2. Policies to reduce agricultural run-off or subsidies to improve the quality and reduce the quantity needed of water polluting agricultural inputs (e.g. fertilizers)
3. Limiting water abstraction during critical low flow periods to limit the concentration of pollutants
4. Strong and consistent political leadership on water
5. Land planning (e.g. locating industrial sites outside the city)

== Water treatment ==
Water treatment technologies can convert non-freshwater to freshwater by removing pollutants. Much of water's physical pollution includes organisms, metals, acids, sediment, chemicals, waste, and nutrients. Water can be treated and purified into freshwater with limited or no constituents through certain processes. The processes involved in removing the contaminants include physical processes such as settling and filtration, chemical processes such as disinfection and coagulation, and biological processes such as slow sand filtration.

A variety of innovations exist to effectively treat water at the point of use for human consumption. Studies have shown treatment to point of use sources reduces child mortality by diarrhea by 29%. Home water treatments are also a part of the United Nations' Millennium Development Goals, with the goal of providing both clean water supply and sewage connection in homes. Although these interventions have been evaluated by the United Nations, various challenges may reduce the effectiveness of home treatment solutions, such as low education, low-dedication to repair, replacement, and maintenance, or local repair services or parts are unavailable.

Current point of use and small scale treatment technologies include:

- NaDCC, sodium dichloroisocyanurate
- Boiling water
- Solar disinfection (SODIS)
- Chlorine

== Global programs ==
=== Central Asia Water and Energy Program ===
Central Asia Water and Energy Program (CAWEP) is a World Bank, European Union, Swiss & UK funded program to organize Central Asian governments on common water resources management through regional organizations, like the International Fund for Saving the Aral Sea (IFAS). The program focuses on three issues: water security, energy security and energy-water linkages. It aims to foster balanced communications between Central Asian countries to achieve a regional goal, water and energy security. To ensure their goal, the program works closely with governments, civil and national organizations.

Most recently, the program helped organize The Global Disruptive Tech Challenge: Restoring Landscapes in the Aral Sea Region. This competition was created to encourage bright minds to come up with revolutionary solutions for land degradation and desertification in the Aral Sea Region, which used to be home to one of the largest lakes in the world and has since been reduced near to nothing. There were several winning projects that centered around agriculture and land management, sustainable forestry, socio-economic development and globally expanding people knowledge and access to information on the issue.

=== Sanitation and Water for All ===
Aimed at achieving the United Nations' Sustainable Development Goal 6, Sanitation and Water for All (SWA) was established as a platform for partnerships between governments, civil society, the private sector, UN agencies, research and learning institutions, and the philanthropic community. SWA encourages partners to prioritize water, sanitation and hygiene along with ensuring sufficient finance and building better governance structures. To ensure that these priorities remain so, the SWA holds "High Level Meetings" where partners communicate the recent developments made, measure progress, and continue the discussion on the importance of Sustainable Development Goal 6.

=== The Water Project ===
The Water Project, Inc is a non-profit international organization that develops and implements sustainable water projects in Sub-Saharan Africa like Kenya, Rwanda, Sierra Leone, Sudan, and Uganda. The Water Project has funded or completed over 2,500 projects and 1,500 water sources that have helped over 569,000 people improve their access to clean water and sanitation. These projects focus heavily on teaching proper sanitation and hygiene practices, as well as improving water facilities by drilling boreholes, updating well structures, and introducing rain water harvesting solutions.

=== UN-Water ===
In 2003, the United Nations High Level Committee on Programmes created UN-Water, an inter-agency mechanism, "to add value to UN initiatives by fostering greater co-operation and information-sharing among existing UN agencies and outside partners." UN-Water publishes communication materials for decision-makers that work directly with water issues and provides a platform for discussions regarding global water management. They also sponsor World Water Day on 22 March to focus attention on the importance of freshwater and sustainable freshwater management.

== Country examples ==
=== India ===
India's growing population is putting a strain on the country's preciously scarce water resources. According to The World Bank, the population of India as of 2019 was roughly 1,366,417,750 people. Although this number has increased since then, India's population count has made it the second-most populated country in the world, following close behind the first most populated country, China. The country is classified as "water stressed" with a water availability of 1,000–1,700 m^{3}/person/year. 21% of countries' diseases are related to water. In 2008, 88% of the population had access and was using improved drinking water sources. However, "Improved drinking water source" is an ambiguous term, ranging in meaning from fully treated and 24-hour availability to merely being piped through the city and sporadically available. This is in part due to large inefficiencies in the water infrastructure in which up to 40% of water leaks out.

In UNICEF's 2008 report, only 31% of the population had access and used improved sanitation facilities. A little more than half of the 16 million residents of New Delhi, the capital city, have access to this service. Every day, 950 million gallons of sewage flows from New Delhi into the Yamuna River without any significant forms of treatment. This river bubbles with methane and was found to have a fecal coliform count 10,000 times the safe limit for bathing.

The inequality between urban and rural areas is significant. In rural areas, 84% can access safe water while only 21% for sanitation. In contrast, 96% of people in urban areas have access to water sources and sanitation which meet satisfying quality. Additionally, there are not enough wastewater treatment facilities to dispose of wastewater discharged from the growing population. By 2050 half of India's population will account for urban areas and will face serious water problems.

Surface water contamination, due to lack of sewage treatment and industrial discharge, makes groundwater increasingly exploited in many regions of India. This is aggravated by heavily subsidized energy costs for agriculture practices that make up roughly 80% of India's water resource demand.

In India, 80% of the health issues come from waterborne diseases. Part of this challenge includes addressing the pollution of the Ganges (Ganga) river, which is home to about 400 million people. The river receives about over 1.3 billion litres of domestic waste, along with 260 million litres of industrial waste, run off from 6 million tons of fertilizers and 9,000 tons of pesticides used in agriculture, thousands of animal carcasses and several hundred human corpses released into the river every day for spiritual rebirth. Two-thirds of this waste is released into the river untreated.

=== Kenya ===
Kenya, a country of 50 million population, struggles with a staggering population growth rate of 2.28% per year. This high population growth rate pushes Kenya's natural resources to the brink of total depletion. 32% of the population don't have access to improved water sources whereas 48% cannot access basic sanitation systems. Much of the country has a severely arid climate, with a few areas enjoying rain and access to water resources. Deforestation and soil degradation have polluted surface water, and the government does not have the capacity to develop water treatment or distribution systems, leaving the vast majority of the country without access to water. This has exacerbated gender politics, as 74% of women must spend an average of 8 hours per day securing water for their families.

Low income has worsened the situation. It is estimated that 66% of the total population lives to earn less than $3.20 per day. Despite its poor quality and unreliableness, costs for water in local areas are 9 times higher than that of safe water in urban areas. This regional inequality makes people in rural areas difficult to obtain water on a daily basis. Furthermore, even in urban areas, which are equipped with piped water systems, it's hard to produce a reliable constant flow of water. Practical solutions are needed in the entire country. The Sand dam is one of the decentralized rainwater harvesting infrastructures to deal with this unbalanced water distribution. This low-cost infrastructure has a simple and understandable structure, conserving surplus water for later use, increasing efficiency and rural regions' water access by saving people's time to gathering water on a long road. There are already about 1,800 sand dams in Kitui County.

The growing population and stagnant economy have exacerbated urban, suburban, and rural poverty. It also has aggravated the country's lack of access to clean drinking water which leaves most of the non-elite population suffering from disease. Around 240 million people suffer from schistosomiasis which occurs because of parasitic worms that may be contracted through drinking infested waters. This leads to the crippling of Kenya's human capital.

Private water companies have taken up the slack from Kenya's government, but the Kenyan government prevents them from moving into the poverty-stricken areas to avoid profiteering activities. Unfortunately, since Kenya's government also refuses to provide services, this leaves the disenfranchised with no options for obtaining clean water.

=== Bangladesh ===
Bangladesh is faced with multiple water quality and quantity problems (such as salinity, groundwater depletion and natural arsenic contamination of groundwater) along with regular natural disasters, such as cyclones and floods. Available options for providing safe drinking water include tubewells, traditionally dug wells, treatment of surface water, desalination of groundwater with high salinity levels, and rainwater harvesting.

Only 56% of the population was estimated to have access to adequate sanitation facilities in 2010. A new approach to improve sanitation coverage in rural areas, called the community-led total sanitation concept, has helped to increase the sanitation coverage. Basic sanitation was available to 59.3% of the population as of 2022. progress for basic sanitation have been considered too slow by Joint Monitoring Programme for Water Supply and Sanitation (JMP)

=== Panama ===
Water supply and sanitation in Panama is characterized by relatively high levels of access compared to other Latin American countries. However, challenges remain, especially in rural areas. Panama has a tropical climate and receives abundant rainfall (up to 3000mm per year), yet the country still suffers from limited water access and pollution. Intense El Niño periods, periodic droughts, reduce water availability. Multiple factors like urbanization, impacts of climate change, and economic development have decreased water resources. The high frequency of floods in recent years and the lack of corresponding measures resulted in tension among the local population. Rapid population growth in recent decades led to an unprecedented increase in freshwater demand. Regional inequality exists in water resources and water governance. An estimated 7.5-31% of Panama's population lives in isolated rural areas with minimal access to potable water and few sewage treatment facilities.

Given the large quantities of rainfall, rainwater harvesting has been implemented as a solution to increase water access. Still, the rainwater is subject to pick up any substances on the rooftops that it runs over before entering a collection tank. Water quality tests revealed that the collected water often contains coliforms or fecal coliforms, likely from running through animal droppings on roofs.

== See also ==
- List of water-related charities
- WASH – Water, sanitation and hygiene
- Human right to water and sanitation
