= Joseph E. Potter =

American sociologist (died 2024)

Joseph E. Potter (1946 – 2024) was an American sociologist, demographer, and professor of sociology at the University of Texas at Austin. From 2011, he was also the leader of the Texas Policy Evaluation Project (TxPEP), which has aimed to investigate the effect of restrictive abortion and family planning laws passed in Texas. Previously, he was the director of the Border Contraceptive Access Study.

== Education ==
Potter graduated from Yale University with a B.A. in economics in 1968. He then earned an MPA in 1973 at the Princeton School of Public and International Affairs. Potter received his Ph.D. in economics from Princeton University in 1975, mentored by Dr. Ansley Coale.

== Work ==
As part of his work with TxPEP, Potter co-authored a 2016 study of the effects of Texas's funding cuts to Planned Parenthood on the number of births among Medicaid patients and the use of birth control in the state. He has also researched the demand for long-acting reversible contraception (e.g. IUDs) and female sterilization among Texas women, and the difference between the percent of women who want to use such contraceptives and the percent who actually use them.

== Death ==
Potter died on May 13, 2024.
