= Catarina de Albuquerque =

Portuguese lawyer and rights activist (1970–2025)

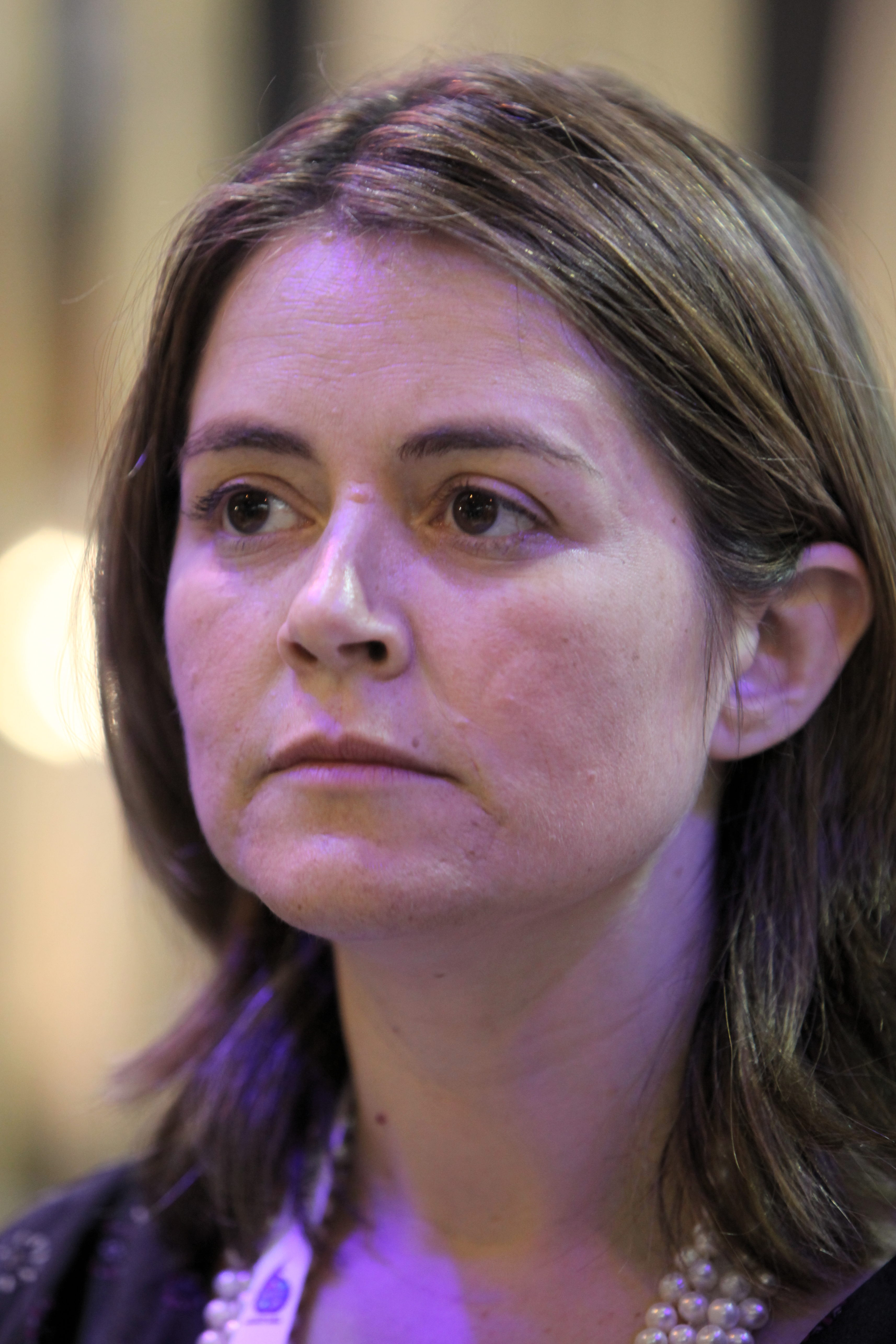
Catarina de Albuquerque

Catarina de Albuquerque (12 May 1970 – 7 October 2025) was a Portuguese lawyer and human rights activist who served as the first United Nations special rapporteur on the right to safe drinking water and sanitation (2008–2014). After becoming Executive Chair of Sanitation and Water for All (SWA) in 2015, in September 2018 she was appointed SWA's chief executive officer.

== Life and career ==
Born in 1970, Catarina de Albuquerque attended the German International School in Lisbon before graduating in law from the University of Lisbon. She then earned a master's degree in law (LLM) from the Graduate Institute of International and Development Studies in Geneva, leading her into her first contacts with the United Nations.

Catarina de Albuquerque joined Sanitation and Water for All in 2014 and she published Measuring What We Treasure and Treasuring What We Measure: The Promise and Perils of Global Monitoring for the Promotion of Equality in the Water, Sanitation, and Hygiene Sector, which she wrote with Inga Winkler and Margaret Satterthwaite.

In July 2018, following a wide-ranging governance review, SWA created the position of chief executive officer and de Albuquerque was chosen for the position in a competitive process. She led the SWA secretariat and provided strategic leadership compatible with its vision and high-level objectives, including all operational, executive and fundraising activities.

In 2008, de Albuquerque was appointed by the United Nations Human Rights Council to become the first UN special rapporteur on the human right to safe drinking water and sanitation. In 2010, she played a pivotal role in the recognition of water and sanitation as human rights by the UN General Assembly. Her work helped ensure that the rights to water and sanitation were incorporated into the language of the Sustainable Development Goals.

Between 2004 and 2008 she presided over the negotiations of the Optional Protocol to the International Covenant on Economic, Social and Cultural Rights, which the UN General Assembly approved by consensus on 10 December 2008. She also participated in the development of several other international human rights standards, including the two Optional Protocols: one on the Convention on the Rights of the Child on the Involvement of Children in Armed Conflict, and the one on Sale of Children, Child Pornography and Child Prostitution.

She was awarded the Human Rights Golden Medal by the Portuguese Parliament (10 December 2009) for outstanding work in the area of human rights. Her work in human rights was also honoured by the Portuguese president of the republic with the Order of Merit (October 2009), which is a recognition of an individual’s personal bravery, achievement, or service. She held an honorary degree from the University of Carolina at Chapel Hill, a law degree from the Law Faculty of the University of Lisbon (Portugal) and a diplôme d'études supérieure from the Institut Universitaire de Hautes Etudes Internationales (Geneva, Switzerland).

De Albuquerque was an invited professor at the law faculties of the Universities of Braga and Coimbra (Portugal), at the American University’s Washington College of Law, at the European Inter-University Centre for Human Rights and Democratization. She was also a senior legal adviser at the Office for Documentation and Comparative Law, an independent institution under the Portuguese Prosecutor General's Office. During her career she also worked for the Swiss Development Agency, the European Commission, UNICEF, and UNDP, among others. She had country experience in Angola, Bangladesh, Brazil, Costa Rica, Egypt, Japan, Jordan, Kenya, Kiribati, Moldova, Mozambique, Namibia, Nicaragua, Portugal, Romania, Senegal, Slovenia, Switzerland, Thailand, Timor-Leste, Tunisia, Tuvalu, Uruguay, and the United States.

De Albuquerque died of cancer on October 7 2025, at the age of 55.

== Awards ==
De Albuquerque received the Order of Merit from the Portuguese president in October 2009 and the Human Rights Golden Medal from the Portuguese Parliament in December 2009.
