= Wells of Life =

Ugandan non-profit organization

- Formation: 2008; 18 years ago
- Founder: Nick Jordan
- Type: 501(c)(3) organization
- Region served: Uganda
- Services: Water wells
- Website: https://www.wellsoflife.org/

Wells of Life (WOL) is a non-profit organization whose aim is to provide rural Ugandans with access to safe and clean water. Their primary methods include installing sustainable borehole water wells and educating local communities on sustainable hygiene and water supply practices. It was founded in 2008 and has funded over 1,300 wells, primarily in the Mityana, Kassanda and Mubende regions of Uganda, all of which collectively serve more than 1,300,000 people. It is based in San Juan Capistrano, California and has built its headquarters in Mityana, Uganda. In 2018, Wells of Life founded its Irish counterpart, Wells of Life Ireland.

== History ==
Wells of Life was founded in 2008 by Nick Jordan, a real estate agent from Laguna Beach, California and a native of Ireland, who recognized the urgent need for clean water during a visit to Uganda. The organization constructed its first wells in February 2010 and was granted 501(c)(3) non-profit status in 2011.

In 2015, Wells of Life was recognized as Forge54's sponsored non-profit of the year, receiving services valued at $574,725 from nearly 100 volunteers during Forge54's third annual 54-hour weekend volunteering marathon.

In August 2016, Wells of Life initiated a partnership with the Christian East Africa Economic Development Trust (CEED).

On March 12, 2018, the Kingdom of Buganda signed a memorandum of understanding with Wells of Life, endorsing their shared objective of providing clean water to the Buluuli, Kooki, and Mawogola counties of Uganda, where the need for water is most critical.

During the same month, Wells of Life purchased land in the Mubende region of Uganda to construct a 12,000-square-foot, $1 million headquarters.

In May 2018, Wells of Life established its Irish counterpart, Wells of Life Ireland, based in Navan, County Meath.

In 2019, Wells of Life launched Operation Restoration, a project aimed at rehabilitating non-functioning wells initially drilled by other organizations.

In April 2020, in response to the COVID-19 pandemic, Wells of Life donated 10,000 bars of soap to local and national leaders in Uganda.

In September 2020, Wells of Life founder Nick Jordan received the Pope John XXIII 2020 Humanitarian Award. The Italian Catholic Federation, which initiated the Pope Saint John XXIII Award in 1970, grants this honor as their highest recognition to a layperson of any denomination who demonstrates outstanding humanitarian service to society. Perry Shurko, the Italian Catholic Federation member who nominated Jordan, stated, "No human being should ever be deprived of these essentials, and I applaud Nick's extraordinary efforts to save lives and provide greater opportunities for Uganda's poorest communities."

In 2021 and 2022, Wells of Life hosted two of the top five galas in Orange County, as reported by the Orange County Business Journal, generating total net revenues of $1.81 million and $1.84 million, respectively.

In August 2023, Wells of Life launched Project GreenWell to revolutionize water access and sustainability in rural Uganda. By becoming an Area Service Provider (ASP) for preventative maintenance of wells, they aimed to address the significant challenges current water management systems face and ensure the long-term functionality of rural water sources.

== Partnerships ==
Wells of Life has a partnership with the Honorable Charles Peter Mayiga, the Prime Minister of the Kingdom of Buganda. During their March 2018 meeting, part of which aired on NTV Uganda, Jordan and Mayiga discussed the consequences of inaccessible water in Uganda, as well as Jordan's goal of helping all of Uganda gain access to clean drinking water by 2038. Mayiga also sits on Wells of Life's Advisory Board, and in the summer of 2023 he visited their headquarters in California to thank them for the contribution they have made by bringing water to the people of Buganda.

Wells of Life partners with the Christian East Africa Economic Development Trust (CEED) to drill its wells. CEED is a US-based non-governmental organization that has employed local Ugandans to drill and repair wells for more than 20 years. CEED is responsible for designing the sustainable well that Wells of Life places in villages.

In 2018, Austin Hedges, catcher for the San Diego Padres and a Wells of Life Ambassador, partnered with Adam Wainwright's Big League Impact to raise funds for Wells of Life. Hedges asked donors to pledge an amount per Padres win in the 2018 season, and pledged to match their donations up to $12,000.

In 2020, Wells of Life partnered with She for She, a Ugandan-based social enterprise that provides sustainable menstrual kits to young women in rural areas. Along with providing the students with menstrual kits, Wells of Life will also host an education session with male students targeted at helping reduce menstruation related bullying.

In July 2023, Wells of Life and Charity: water partnered to promote the sustainability of wells in Uganda's communities using water sensors. 50 sensors were donated by charity: water, so that Wells of Life can see the flow rate of each one of these wells, allowing them to quickly respond and fix problems as they arise and improve the overall efficiency and effectiveness of each well.

In September 2023, the Ugandan Water Project and Wells of Life joined together to deploy "mWater" water point mapping as part of the Rural and Urban Management Information System (RUMIS) pilot in Kabale District, Uganda as well as two additional districts: one in the Eastern Region and one in the Karamoja Region.

In November 2023, YouTuber MrBeast built 100 clean water wells in several different countries in Africa. Of those 100 wells, 30 of them were drilled by Wells of Life.

== Programs ==
=== We Drill Wells ===
As of January 2025, Wells of Life has funded the drilling of 928 new wells in Uganda, primarily in the Mityana, Kassanda and Mubende regions. Each new well costs $8,000, which includes drilling, maintenance, and repair costs.

The wells are personalized with plaques containing information about the well's donor. Donors have included celebrities, local organisations, and schools. Wells have also been donated to mark special occasions, and to honour individuals posthumously, such as Billy Graham, the victims of the September 11 attacks, and six Irish students who died in a balcony collapse in Berkeley, California in 2015.

=== Operation Restoration ===
As of January 2025, Wells of Life has funded the restoration of 468 wells. Each restoration of a well costs $4,000, which includes, drilling, maintenance, and repair costs.

=== Healthy Village ===
WASH (acronym for interrelated areas of Water, Sanitation and Hygiene) was started in 2019. It was later renamed Healthy Village Program. Wells of Life has completed 130 Healthy Village (WASH) programs since the program started.

The program provides education and resources that encourage healthy sanitation and hygienic practices. The program implementation takes approximately 12 months in order to educate the community on how to build and use latrines, ending open defecation and thus eliminating fecal contamination.

=== Water Warriors ===
Water Warriors is the name for the organisation's program of monthly giving to the charity.

=== Run4Water ===
Run4Water is a sponsored running event raising funds for the charity. Schools, churches, businesses & families have taken part. For the past 10 years, this event has brought clean water to over 300,000 people in rural Uganda. In 2024, it raised $200,000.

=== Legacy Circle ===
The Legacy Circle is a group of individuals who commit to five-year pledges to fund Wells of Life's operational costs. Currently, 78 donors have done so, totalling $3.7 million from 2022-2026.

In recent years, the annual Legacy Gala has made a significant impact, raising a combined total of $5,940,000 over the past four years.
