= Human right to water and sanitation =

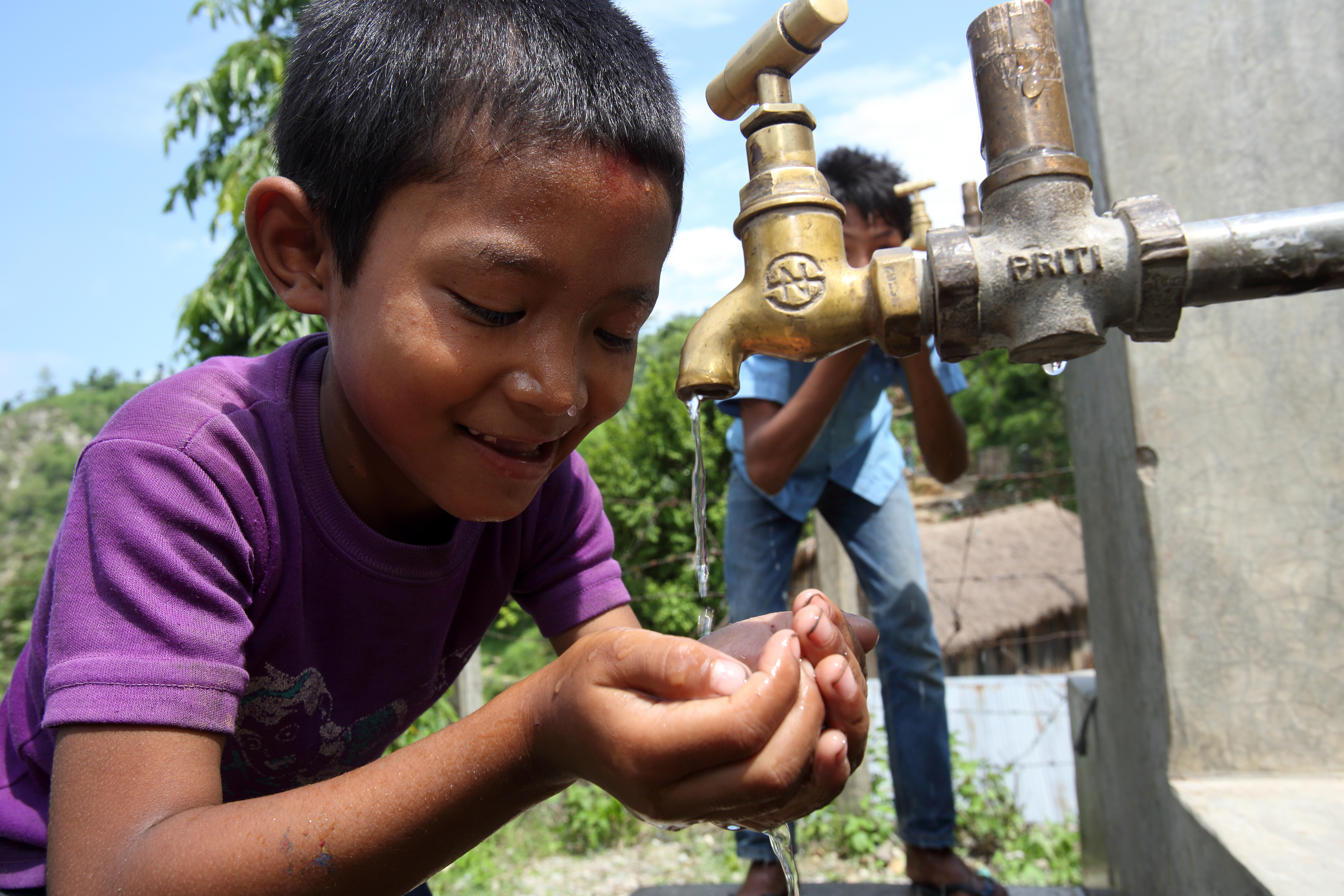
A boy drinks from a tap at a NEWAH WASH water project in Nepal

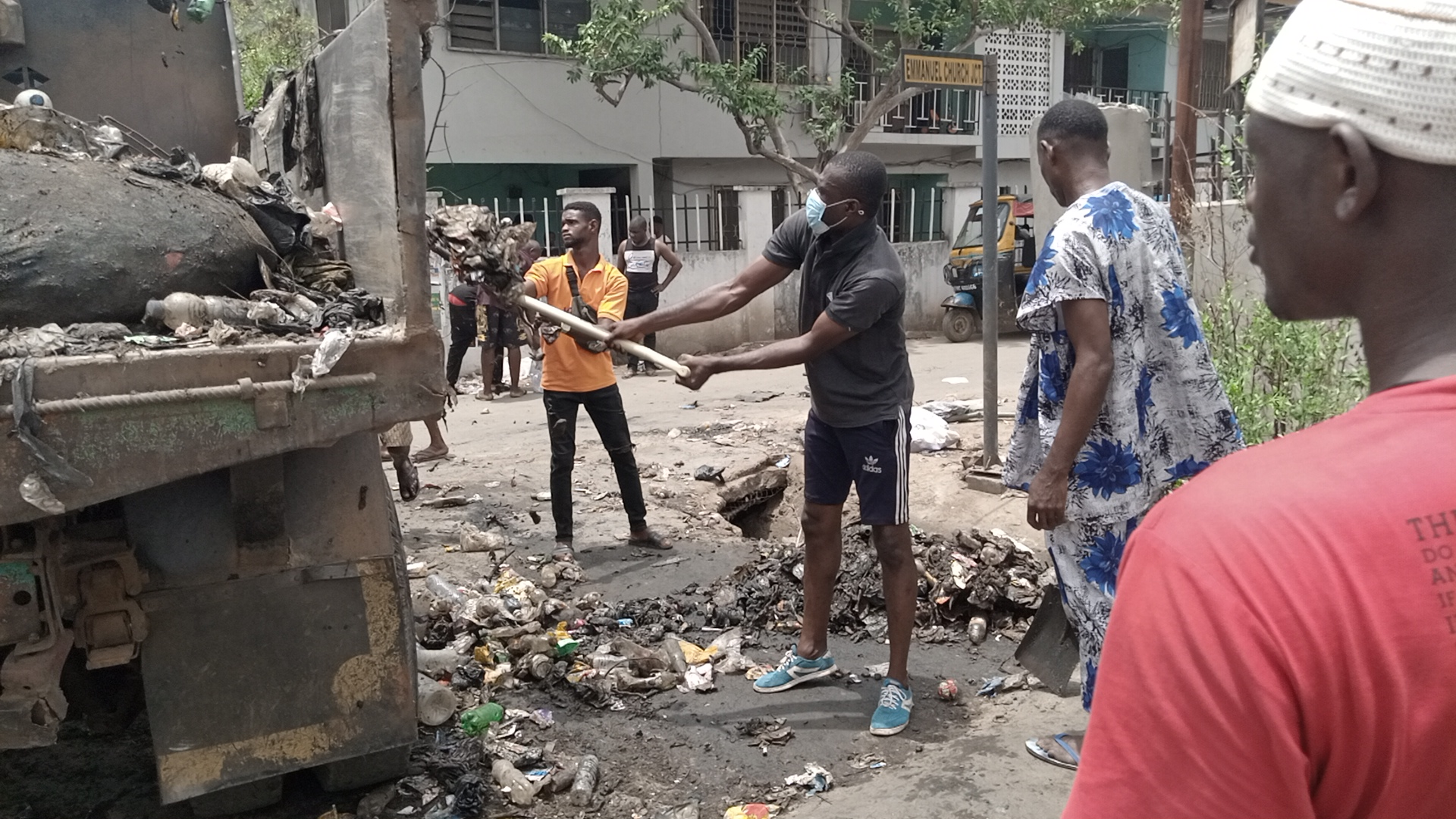
People sanitizing the environment in Nigeria

The human right to water and sanitation (HRWS) is a principle stating that clean drinking water and sanitation are a universal human right because of their high importance in sustaining every person's life. It was recognized as a human right by the United Nations General Assembly on 28 July 2010. The HRWS has been recognized in international law through human rights treaties, declarations and other standards. Other treaties that explicitly recognize the HRWS include the 1979 Convention on the Elimination of All Forms of Discrimination Against Women (CEDAW) and the 1989 Convention on the Rights of the Child (CRC).

The clearest definition of the human right to water was issued by the United Nations Committee on Economic, Social and Cultural Rights in General Comment 15 drafted in 2002. It was a non-binding interpretation that access to water was a condition for the enjoyment of the right to an adequate standard of living, inextricably related to the right to the highest attainable standard of health, and therefore a human right. It stated: "The human right to water entitles everyone to sufficient, safe, acceptable, physically accessible and affordable water for personal and domestic uses." and also stated that "The human right to sanitation entitles everyone to have physical and affordable access to sanitation, in all spheres of life, that is safe, secure, hygienic, and socially and culturally acceptable and that provides privacy and ensures dignity".

The first resolutions about the HRWS were passed by the UN General Assembly and the UN Human Rights Council in 2010. They stated that there was a human right to sanitation connected to the human right to water, since the lack of sanitation reduces the quality of water downstream, so subsequent discussions have continued emphasizing both rights together. In July 2010, United Nations (UN) General Assembly Resolution 64/292 reasserted the human right to receive safe, affordable, and clean accessible water and sanitation services. During that General Assembly, it stated that for the comprehension of enjoyment in life and all human rights, safe and clean drinking water as well as sanitation is acknowledged as a human right. General Assembly Resolution 64/292's assertion of a free human right of access to safe and clean drinking water and sanitation raises issues regarding governmental rights to control and responsibilities for securing that water and sanitation. The United Nations Development Programme has stated that broad recognition of the significance of accessing dependable and clean water and sanitation services will promote wide expansion of the achievement of a healthy and fulfilling life. A revised UN resolution in 2015 highlighted that the two rights were separate but equal.

The HRWS obliges governments to ensure that people can enjoy quality, available, acceptable, accessible, and affordable water and sanitation. Affordability of water considers the extent to which the cost of water becomes inhibitive such that it requires one to sacrifice access to other essential goods and services. Generally, a rule of thumb for the affordability of water is that it should not surpass 3–5% of households' income. Accessibility of water considers the time taken, convenience in reaching the source and risks involved while getting to the source of water. Water must be accessible to every citizen, meaning that water should not be further than 1,000 meters or 3,280 feet and must be within 30 minutes. Availability of water considers whether the supply of water is available in adequate amounts, reliable and sustainable. Quality of water considers whether water is safe for consumption, including for drinking or other activities. For acceptability of water, it must not have any odor and should not consist of any color.

The ICESCR requires signatory countries to progressively achieve and respect all human rights, including those of water and sanitation. They should work quickly and efficiently to increase access and improve service.

== International context ==
The WHO/UNICEF Joint Monitoring Programme for Water Supply and Sanitation reported that 663 million people lacked access to improved sources of drinking water and more than 2.4 billion people lacked access to basic sanitation services in 2015. Access to clean water is a major problem for many parts of the world. Acceptable sources include "household connections, public standpipes, boreholes, protected dug wells, protected springs and rainwater collections". Although 9 percent of the global population lacks access to water, there are "regions particularly delayed, such as Sub-Saharan Africa". The UN further emphasizes that "about 1.5 million children under the age of five die each year and 443 million school days are lost because of water- and sanitation-related diseases". In 2022, over 2 billion people, 25% of the world's population, lacked consistent access to clean drinking water. 4.2 billion lacked access to safe sanitation services. By 2024, new estimates are much higher, with 4.4 billion people in low- and middle-income countries lacking access to safe household drinking water.

== Legal foundations and recognition ==
The International Covenant on Economic, Social and Cultural Rights (ICESCR) of 1966 codified the economic, social, and cultural rights found within the Universal Declaration on Human Rights (UDHR) of 1948. Neither of these early documents explicitly recognized human rights to water and sanitation. Several later international human rights conventions, however, had provisions that explicitly recognized rights to water and sanitation.

- The 1979 Convention on the Elimination of All Forms of Discrimination Against Women (CEDAW) has Article 14.2 that states that "parties shall take all appropriate measures to eliminate discrimination against women in rural areas to ensure, on a basis of equality of men and women, that they participate in and benefit from rural development and, in particular shall ensure to women the right: ... (h) To enjoy adequate living conditions, particularly in relation to housing, sanitation, electricity and water supply, transport and communications."
- The 1989 Convention on the Rights of the Child (CRC) has Article 24 that provides that "parties recognize the right of the child to the enjoyment of the highest attainable standard of health and to facilities for the treatment of illness and rehabilitation of health ... 2. States parties shall pursue full implementation of this right and, in particular, shall take appropriate measures... (c) To combat disease and malnutrition, including within the framework of primary health care, through, inter alia... the provision of adequate nutritious foods and clean drinking water..."
- The 2006 Convention on the Rights of Persons with Disabilities (CRPD) has Article 28(2)(a) that requires that "parties recognize the right of persons with disabilities to social protection and to the enjoyment of that right without discrimination on the basis of disability, and shall take appropriate steps to safeguard and promote the realization of this right, including measures to ensure equal access by persons with disabilities to clean water services, and to ensure access to appropriate and affordable services, devices and other assistance for disability-related needs."

"The International Bill of Human Rights"- which comprises the 1966: International Covenant on Civil and Political Rights (ICCPR); 1966: Articles 11 and 12 of the 1966 International Covenant of Economic, Social, and Cultural Right (ICERS); and 1948: Article 25 of the Universal Declaration of Human Rights (UDHR) documented the evolution of human right to water and sanitation and other water-associated rights to be recognised in worldwide decree.

Scholars also called attention to the importance of possible UN recognition of human rights to water and sanitation at the end of the twentieth century. Two early efforts to define the human right to water came from law professor Stephen McCaffrey of the University of the Pacific in 1992 and Dr. Peter Gleick in 1999. McCaffrey stated that "Such a right could be envisaged as part and parcel of the right to food or sustenance, the right to health, or most fundamentally, the right to life. Gleick added: "that access to a basic water requirement is a fundamental human right implicitly and explicitly supported by international law, declarations, and State practice."

The UN Committee for Economic, Social and Cultural Rights (CESCR) overseeing ICESCR compliance came to similar conclusions as these scholars with General Comment 15 in 2002. It was found that, the right to water was an implicitly part of the right to an adequate standard of living and related to the right to the highest attainable standard of health and the rights to adequate housing and adequate food. It defines that "The human right to water entitles everyone to sufficient, safe, acceptable, physically accessible and affordable water for personal and domestic uses. An adequate amount of safe water is necessary to prevent death from dehydration, to reduce the risk of water-related disease and to provide for consumption, cooking, personal and domestic hygienic requirements." Several countries agreed and formally acknowledged the right to water to be part of their treaty obligations under the ICESCR (e.g., Germany; United Kingdom; Netherlands) after publication of General Comment 15.

A further step was taken in 2005 by the former UN Sub-Commission on the Promotion and Protection of Human Rights which issued guidelines to assist governments to achieve and respect the human right to water and sanitation. These guidelines led the UN Human Rights Council to assign Catarina de Albuquerque as an independent expert on the issue of human rights obligations related to access to safe drinking water and sanitation in 2008. She wrote a detailed report in 2009 that outlined human rights obligations to sanitation, and the CESCR responded by stating that sanitation should be recognized by all states.

Following intense negotiations, 122 countries formally acknowledged "the Human Right to Water and Sanitation" in General Assembly Resolution 64/292 on 28 July 2010. It recognized the right of every human being to have access to sufficient water for personal and domestic uses (between 50 and 100 liters of water per person per day), which must be safe, acceptable and affordable (water costs should not exceed 3% of household income), and physically accessible (the water source has to be within 1,000 meters of the home and collection time should not exceed 30 minutes)." The General Assembly declared that clean drinking water is "essential to the full enjoyment of life and all other human rights". In September 2010, the UN Human Rights Council adopted a resolution recognizing that the human right to water and sanitation forms part of the right to an adequate standard of living.

The mandate of Catarina de Albuquerque as "Independent expert on the issue of human rights obligations related to access to safe drinking water and sanitation" was extended and renamed as "Special Rapporteur on the human right to safe drinking water and sanitation" after the resolutions in 2010. Through her reports to the Human Rights Council and the UN General Assembly, she continued clarifying the scope and content of the human right to water and sanitation. As Special Rapporteur, she addressed issues such as: Human Rights Obligations Related to Non-State Service Provision in Water and Sanitation (2010); Financing for the Realization of the Rights to Water and Sanitation (2011); Wastewater management in the realization of the rights to water and sanitation (2013); and Sustainability and non-retrogression in the realization of the rights to water and sanitation (2013). Léo Heller was appointed in 2014 to be the second Special Rapporteur on the human rights to safe drinking water and sanitation.

Subsequent resolutions extended the mandate of the Special Rapporteur and defined each state's role in the respect of these rights. The most recent General Assembly Resolution 7/169 of 2015 has been called a declaration of "The Human Rights to Safe Drinking Water and Sanitation. It recognized the distinction between the right to water and the right to sanitation. This decision was made due to concern about the right to sanitation being overlooked when compared to the right to water.

== International jurisprudence ==
=== Inter-American Court of Human Rights ===
The right to water has been considered in the Inter-American Court of Human Rights case of the Sawhoyamaxa Indigenous Community v. Paraguay. The issues involved the states failure to acknowledge indigenous communities' property rights over ancestral lands. In 1991, the state removed the indigenous Sawhoyamaxa community from the land resulting in their loss of access to basic essential services, like water, food, schooling and health services. This fell within the scope of the American Convention on Human Rights; encroaching the right to life. Water is included in this right, as part of access to land. The courts required the lands to be returned, compensation provided, and basic goods and services to be implemented, while the community was in the process of having their lands returned.

=== International Centre for Settlement of Investment Disputes ===
The following cases from the International Centre for Settlement of Investment Disputes (ICSID) concern the contracts established between governments and corporations for the maintenance of waterways. Although the cases regard questions of investment, commentators have noted that the indirect impact of the right to water upon the verdicts is significant. World Bank data shows that water privatization spiked starting in the 1990s and significant growth in privatization continued into the 2000s.

==== Azurix Corp v. Argentina ====
The first notable case regarding the right to water in the ICSID is that of Azurix Corp v. Argentina. The dispute was between the Argentine Republic and Azurix Corporation regarding discrepancies arising from a 30-year contract between the parties to operate the water supply of various provinces. A consideration in regard to the right to water is implicitly made during the arbitration for compensation, where it was held that Azurix was entitled to a fair return on the market value of the investment. This was rather than the requested US$438.6 million, citing that a reasonable business person could not expect such a return, given the limits of water price increases and improvements that would be required to ensure a well-functioning, clean water system.

==== Biwater Gauff Ltd v. Tanzania ====
Secondly, a similar case encountered by the ICSID is that of Biwater Gauff Ltd v. Tanzania. This was again a case of a private water company in a contractual dispute with a government, this time the United Republic of Tanzania. This contract was for the operation and management of the Dar es Salaam water system. In May 2005, the Tanzania government ended the contract with Biwater Gauff for its alleged failure to meet performance guarantees. In July 2008, the Tribunal issued its decision on the case, declaring that the Tanzania government had violated the agreement with Biwater Gauff. It did not however award monetary damages to Biwater, acknowledging that public interest concerns were paramount in the dispute.

== Right to water in domestic law ==
Without the existence of an international body that can enforce it, the human right to water relies upon the activity of national courts. The basis for this has been established through the constitutionalisation of economic, social and cultural rights (ESCR) through one of two means: as "directive principles" that are goals and are often non-justiciable; or as expressly protected and enforceable through the courts.

=== South Africa ===
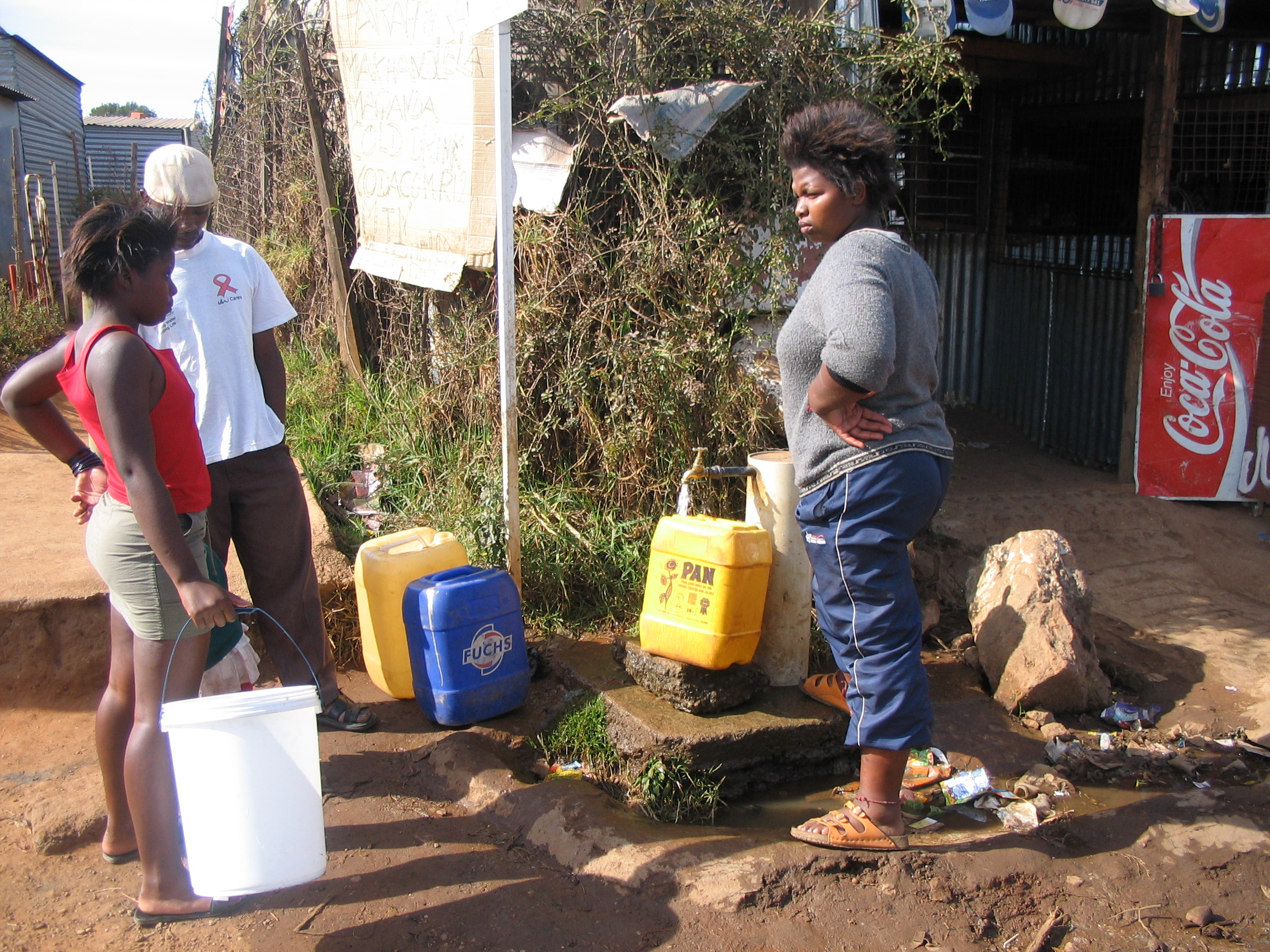
A group of people gathering around a communal tap in Johannesburg, South Africa

In South Africa, the right to water is enshrined in the constitution and implemented by ordinary statutes. This is evidence of a slight modification of the second technique of constitutionalisation referred to as the "subsidiary legislation model". This means that a large portion of the content and implementation of the right is done an ordinary domestic statute with some constitutional standing.

==== Residents of Bon Vista Mansions v. Southern Metropolitan Local Council ====
The first notable case in which the courts did so was the Residents of Bon Vista Mansions v. Southern Metropolitan Local Council. The case was brought by residents of a block of flats (Bon Vista Mansions), following the disconnection of the water supply by the local Council, resulting from the failure to pay water charges. The court held that in adherence to the South African Constitution, that constitutionally all persons ought to have access to water as a right.

Further reasoning for the decision was based on General Comment 12 on the Right to Food, made by the UN Committee on Economic, Social and Cultural Rights imposing upon parties to the agreement the obligation to observe and respect already existing access to adequate food by not implementing any encroaching measures.

The court found that the discontinuation of the existing water source, which had not adhered to the "fair and reasonable" requirements of the South African Water Services Act, was illegal. The decision pre-dates the adoption of the UN General Comment No. 15.

==== Mazibuko v. City of Johannesburg ====
The quantity of water to be provided was further discussed in Mazibuko v City of Johannesburg. The case revolved around the distribution of water through pipes to Phiri, one of the oldest areas of Soweto. This case concerned two major issues: whether or not the city's policy regarding the supply of free basic water, 6 kilolitres per month to each account holder in the city was in conflict with Section 27 of the South African Constitution or Section 11 of the Water Services Act. The second issue being whether or not the installation of pre-paid water meters was lawful. It was held in the High Court that the city's by-laws did not provide for the installation of meters and that their installation was unlawful. Further, as the meters halted supply of water to residence once the free basic water supply had ended, this was deemed an unlawful discontinuation of the water supply. The court held the residents of Phiri should be provided with a free basic water supply of 50 litres per person per day. The work of the Centre for Applied Legal Studies (CALS) of the University of the Witwatersrand in Johannesburg, South Africa and the Pacific Institute in Oakland, California, shared a 2008 Business Ethics Network BENNY Award for their work on this case. The Pacific Institute contributed legal testimony based on the work of Dr. Peter Gleick defining a human right to water and quantifying basic human needs for water.

The big respondents took the case to the Supreme Court of Appeal (SCA) which held that the city's water policy had been formulated based upon a material error of law in regards to the city's obligation to provide the minimum set in the South African National Standard, therefore it was set aside. The court also held the quantity for dignified human existence in compliance with section 27 of the constitution was in fact 42 litres per person per day rather than 50 litres per person per day. The SCA declared that the installation of water meters was illegal, but suspended the order for two years to give the city an opportunity to rectify the situation.

The issues went further to the Constitutional Court, which held that the duty created by the constitution required that the state take reasonable legislative and other measures progressively to realise the achievement of the right to access of water, within its available resource. The Constitutional Court also held that it is a matter for the legislature and executive institution of government to act within the allowance of their budgets and that the scrutiny of their programs is a matter of democratic accountability. Therefore, the minimum content set out by the regulation 3(b) is constitutional, rendering the bodies to deviate upwards and further it is inappropriate for a court to determine the achievement of any social and economic right the government has taken steps to implement. The courts had instead focused their inquiry on whether the steps taken by Government are reasonable, and whether the Government subjects its policies to regular review. The judgment has been criticized for deploying an "unnecessarily limiting concept of judicial deference".

=== India ===
The two most prominent cases in India regarding the right to water illustrate that although this is not explicitly protected in the Constitution of India, it has been interpreted by the courts that the right to life includes the right to safe and sufficient water.

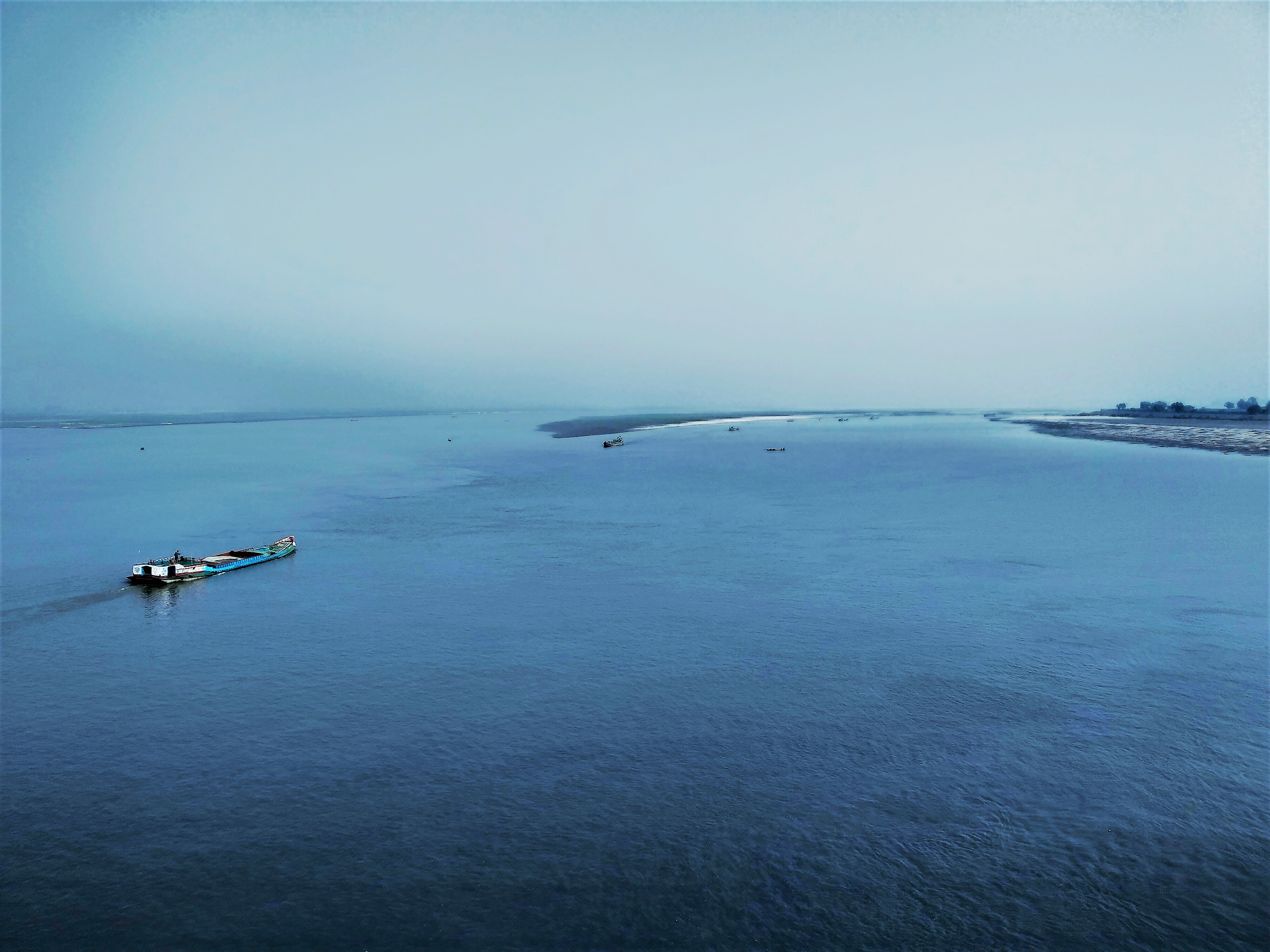
The Jamuna River, the river that the state of Haryana and the city of Delhi were using

==== Delhi Water Supply v. State of Haryana ====
Here a water usage dispute arose due to the fact that the state of Haryana was using the Jamuna River for irrigation, while the residents of Delhi needed it for the purpose of drinking. It was reasoned that domestic use overrode the commercial use of water and the court ruled that Haryana must allow enough water to get to Delhi for consumption and domestic use.

==== Subhash Kumar v. State of Bihar ====
Also notable is the case of Subhash Kumar v. State of Bihar, where a discharge of sludge from the washeries into the Bokaro River was petitioned against by way of public interest litigation. The courts found that the right to life, as protected by Article 21 of the Constitution of India, included the right to enjoy pollution-free water. The case failed upon the facts and it was held that the petition had been filed not in any public interest but for the petitioner's personal interest and therefore a continuation of litigation would amount to an abuse of process.

==== World Rights to Water Day ====
Water is essential for existence of living beings including humans. Therefore, having access to pure and adequate quantity of water is an inalienable human right. Hence, the Eco Needs Foundation (ENF) deems it necessary to recognise the right to water (with ensured per capita minimum quantity of water) through the appropriate expressed legal provision. The United Nations with its several covenants has made it obligatory for all the nations to ensure equitable distribution of water amongst all the citizens. Accordingly, the ENF began to observe and promote the celebration of World Rights to Water Day on 20 March, the date on which Dr. Babasaheb Ambedkar ("the father of modern India") led the world's first satyagraha for water in 1927. The World Right to Water Day calls for the adoption of special legislation establishing the universal right to water. Under the guidance of founder Dr Priyanand Agale, the ENF arranges a variety of several programmes to ensure the right to water for Indian citizens.

=== New Zealand ===
ESCR are not explicitly protected in New Zealand at the current time, either by the Human Rights or Bill of Rights Acts, therefore the right to water is not defended by law there. The New Zealand Law Society has recently indicated that this country would give further consideration to the legal status of economic, social and cultural rights.

=== United States ===
There is no federally recognized human right to water in the United States. Some federal laws do protect water quality:

- Safe Drinking Water Act covers public water supplies, but not private wells nor bottled water
- Clean Water Act, covering surface waters of the United States
- Resource Conservation and Recovery Act
- Superfund, established by the Comprehensive Environmental Response, Compensation, and Liability Act of 1980
- National Environmental Policy Act, which requires environmental impact statements but not mitigation

=== Australia ===
The attention in Australia is focused on the rights of Indigenous Australians to water and sanitation. History of settler-colonialism overshadows today's state governance that regulates water use to indigenous Australians. There are many governmental agreements, but most of them are incomplete to fully influence power to the indigenous right to water and sanitation. In Mabo v Queensland, 1992, Native rights were legally recognized at the first time. Indigenous Australians often claim cultural bonds to the land. Although "culture" was recognized in the court as much as land resources, cultural and spiritual value of Aborigines to water body are fuzzy. It is challenging but needed to transcend their cultural and spiritual values into legal sphere. For now, there is virtually no progress.

Australian water law basically prescribes surface water for citizens who can use surface water but cannot own. In the constitution, however, there is no description about inland and riparian water. Therefore, the sphere of inland/riparian water rights are the primary mandates of the state. The Commonwealth Government obtains authority over water by borrowing the help of external relationship, including the Grants Power, Trade and Commerce Power.

In 2000, the Federal Court concluded the agreement that allowed indigenous landowners to take water for traditional purposes. However, the use is limited to traditional purpose, which did not include irrigation as a traditional practice.

In June 2004, CoAC concluded an intergovernmental accord on a National Water Initiative (NWI), promoting recognition of indigenous right to water. However, NWI is not concerned broadly about complex history of settler-colonialism, which has systematically created an unequal pattern of water distribution. Indigenous people in Australia are constantly seeking the right to water.

== Remaining discussions ==
=== Transboundary effects ===
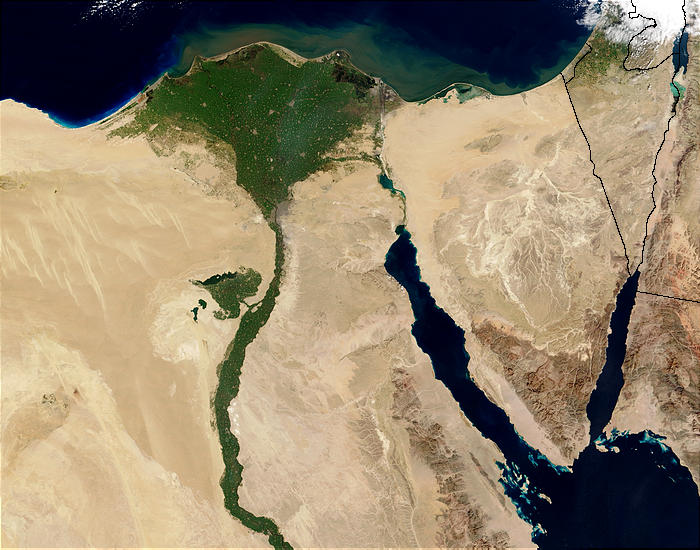
Ethiopia's move to fill the Grand Ethiopian Renaissance Dam's reservoir could reduce Nile flows by as much as 25% and devastate Egyptian farmlands.

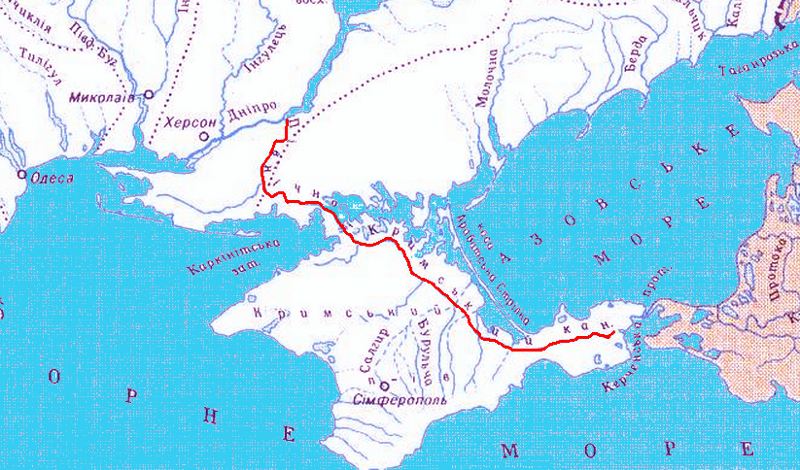
Following Russia's annexation of Crimea, Ukraine blocked the North Crimean Canal, which provided 85% of Crimea's fresh water.

Given the fact that access to water is a cross-border source of concern and potential conflict in the Middle East, South Asia, the Eastern Mediterranean and parts of North America amongst other places, some non-governmental organizations (NGOs) and scholars argue that the right to water also has a trans-national or extraterritorial aspect. They argue that given the fact that water supplies naturally overlap and cross borders, states also have a legal obligation not to act in a way that might have a negative effect on the enjoyment of human rights in other states. The formal acknowledgement of this legal obligation could prevent the negative effects of the global "water crunch" (as a future threat and one negative result of human overpopulation). Water shortages and increasing consumption of freshwater make this right incredibly complicated. As the world population rapidly increases, freshwater shortages will cause many problems. A shortage in the quantity of water brings up the question of whether or not water should be transferred from one country to another.

==== Water Dispute Between India and Pakistan ====
The water dispute between India and Pakistan is influenced by the scarcity of water in the South Asian region. The two countries have a pre-existing agreement known as the Indus Waters Treaty. The treaty was formed to limit the conflict between India and Pakistan regarding the use of the Indus basin and allocate water supply for both countries after the countries gained independence. However, disagreements regarding it have surfaced. According to the treaty, India is allowed to use the western river basin for irrigation and non-consumptive purposes, while Pakistan has the majority of control over the basin. However, Pakistan has voiced concerns that India's construction on the rivers may lead to severe water scarcity in Pakistan. Moreover, Pakistan voiced that the dams constructed by India for non-consumptive purposes may be used to divert water flow and disrupt Pakistan's water supply. In addition, the treaty involves rivers that originate from Jammu and Kashmir, which have been excluded from control over their own water bodies.

=== Water commercialization versus state provision ===
Contention exists regarding whose, if anyone's, responsibility it is to ensure the human right to water and sanitation. Often, two schools of thought emerge from such discourse: it is the state's responsibility to provide access to clean water to people versus the privatization of distribution and sanitation.

The commercialization of water is offered as a response to the increased scarcity of water that has resulted due to the world population tripling while the demand for water has increased six-fold. Market environmentalism uses the markets as a solution to environmental problems such as environmental degradation and an inefficient use of resources. Supporters of market environmentalism believe that the managing of water as an economic good by private companies will be more efficient than governments providing water resources to their citizens. Such proponents claim that the government costs of developing infrastructure for water resource allocation is not worth the marginal benefits of water provision, thus deeming the state as an ineffective provider of water. Moreover, it is argued that water commodification leads to more sustainable water management due to the economic incentives for consumers to use water more efficiently.

The opponents believe that the consequence of water being a human right excludes private sector involvement and requires that water should be given to all people because it is essential to life. Access to water as a human right is used by some NGOs as a means to combat privatization efforts. A human right to water "generally rests on two justifications: the non-substitutability of drinking water ('essential for life'), and the fact that many other human rights which are explicitly recognized in the UN Conventions are predicated upon an (assumed) availability of water (e.g. the right to food)."

== Organizations ==
Organizations working on the rights to water and sanitation are listed below.

=== United Nations organizations ===
- OHCHR (UN Office of the High Commissioner on Human Rights)
- UNDP
- UNICEF
- Sanitation and Water for All

=== Governmental cooperation agencies ===
- DFID (United Kingdom's Cooperation Agency)
- GIZ (German Corporation for International Cooperation)
- SDC (Swiss Agency for Development and Cooperation)
- EPA (United States Environmental Protection Agency)

=== International non-governmental organizations and networks ===
- Action against Hunger (ACF)
- Blood:Water
- Center for Water Security and Cooperation
- Freshwater Action Network (FAN)
- Pure Water for the World
- The DigDeep Right to Water Project
- The Pacific Institute
- The Water Project
- Transnational Institute with the Water Justice project
- UUSC
- WaterAid
- WaterLex (defunct as of 2020)
- PeaceJam
- Thirst Project

== See also ==
- Climate migration and water rights
- Environmental law
- Georgism
- International human rights law
- Hydrosphere
- Period. End of Sentence.
- Three generations of human rights
- WASH - Water, sanitation and hygiene
- Water conflict
- Water law
- Water right
- Water politics
- Water security
- Water supply
- 2022–2023 global food crises
- World Water Day
- Water issues in developing countries
- Workers' right to access the toilet
