= Charlotte Ellertson =

American health expert (1966–2004)

Charlotte Ellertson (March 2, 1966 – March 21, 2004) was a sociologist and public health researcher activist who specialized in emergency contraception and medication abortion. She founded Ibis Reproductive Health, an organization that advocates for sexual and reproductive health education and access. The organization, and Ellertson's work in it, is recognized as instrumental in the FDA approval of the abortion inducing pill RU-486. In 2013, HuffPost named Ellertson one of 50 most influential people in women's health.

== Early life and education ==
Charlotte Ellertson was born in Johannesburg, South Africa in 1966. At the age of 13, Ellertson moved to the United States with her family. Growing up in South Africa, Ellertson was exposed to women's health issues at an early age. Seeing this and women's health issues in the United States prompted Ellertson to want to change women's health.

Ellertson studied Biological Anthropology at Harvard University. Then she attended Princeton University and received her MPA and PhD in 1993 in Demography and Public Affairs from Princeton's Woodrow Wilson School of Public and International Affairs.

== Career ==
=== Social work ===
Ellertson became interested in women's health through her background of growing up in South Africa. She realized that many women around the world were unable to make their own decisions about their own health and bodies, so she decided to make a career out of this passion. During this time, no laws that protected women in making health-related decisions were present, and Ellertson took action in providing the opportunities for women to receive the proper health-care services and needs they deserve. In 2002, she founded Ibis Reproductive Health to change what women's health services were worldwide.

Charlotte Ellertson worked on the Population Council for seven years. She then worked as the Director of Reproductive Health for Latin America and the Caribbean in Mexico City for the final four years. Ellertson had many published articles, books, and reports and concentrating on emergency contraception and medical abortion. Ellertson was named one of 50 most influential women in health by the Huffington Post, and was profiled in the United Nations Population Fund's 2019 tribute to change makers in sexual and reproductive health and rights.

=== Ibis Reproductive Health ===
Founded in 2002, Ibis Reproductive Health is a nonprofit international women's reproductive rights research and advocacy organization. The organization was started out of the basement of a Cambridge, Massachusetts, church by a team of three individuals, and has grown to over 30 people working in Cambridge, San Francisco, and Johannesburg. The nonprofit "focuses on increasing access to safe abortion, expanding contraceptive access and choices, and integrating HIV and comprehensive sexual and reproductive health services."

Projects of Ibis include:

- Free the Pill, previously called "Oral Contraceptives Over-the-Counter Working Group", is a coalition of health, rights, justice, and regulatory organizations and experts to bring birth control pills over the counter (OTC) in the United States, accessible to people of all ages.
- MedicationAbortion.com is a multilingual website run in partnership with nonprofit Cambridge Reproductive Health Consultants which provides medically accurate and evidence-based information about medication abortion.
- The Later Abortion Initiative is a project "to develop an ambitious agenda to preserve access to high-quality later abortion care and promote legislative and service delivery advances to improve pregnant people's access to care and to change the conversation around later abortion and the clients who need this service."

== Personal life ==
Ellertson knew how to speak several languages (including Afrikaans, English, and Spanish), played the viola, and was a talented cook. She married Paull Erskine Hejinian, an immigration lawyer, on October 12, 1996. She had two daughters named Marka and Amity born in 2000 and 2001, respectively. Ellertson's mother, Gabriele Ellertson, was from Minneapolis and taught drawing at Macalester College in St. Paul. Her father was Rev. Caroll Ellertson who was a Lutheran minister and missionary in KwaZulu-Natal, South Africa.

Ellertson died at the age of 38 on March 21, 2004, from breast cancer.

== Charlotte Ellertson Fund ==
The Charlotte Ellertson Fund was created after she died by Ibis's Board of Directors. The fund is used "to provide a source of unrestricted funding that allows Ibis the flexibility to respond quickly to an urgent topic or to focus on a critical organization need with an eye toward Ibis's impact and sustainability."
