= Toilet Museum =

Toilet Museum may refer to:

- Haewoojae
- Sulabh International Museum of Toilets
- Toilet History Museum
