= Lee Kuan Yew School of Public Policy =

Public policy school of the National University of Singapore

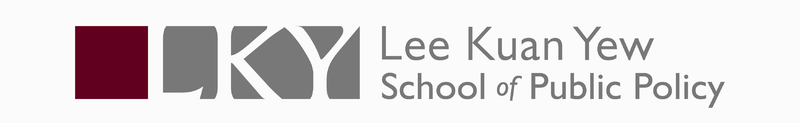
- Type: Graduate school
- Established: 4 August 2004; 21 years ago
- Parent institution: National University of Singapore
- Affiliations: APSIA
- Dean: Joseph Liow Chinyong
- Location: 469C Bukit Timah Road, Singapore 259772; 1°19′11″N 103°49′03″E
- Campus: Suburban Bukit Timah Campus
- Colours: Maroon; Grey
- Website: lkyspp.nus.edu.sg

The Lee Kuan Yew School of Public Policy (LKY School) is an autonomous postgraduate school of the National University of Singapore (NUS), named after the late former prime minister of Singapore, Lee Kuan Yew.

== History ==
The Lee Kuan Yew School of Public Policy is an autonomous postgraduate school of the National University of Singapore (NUS). It was formally launched on 4 August 2004 and named in honour of Singapore's first and longest-serving prime minister. The school inherited the Policy Programme that NUS had set up with Harvard Kennedy School in 1992. As of 2026, the LKY School offers four master's degree programmes, a senior fellowship programme and a PhD programme, and has three research centres.

The mission of the school is to 'be the leading global public policy school in Asia, developing thought leadership, improving standards of governance and transforming lives for a more sustainable world.

Its Executive Education, the consultancy arm of the school, established also in 2010 provides short term training programs for over 2,000 senior professionals annually from over 90 countries worldwide.

As of 2018, the school has over 2,800 alumni from over 90 countries. About 80 per cent of its student body consists of international students with the rest from Singapore.

In 2019, the school also published its revamped corporate video which promotes governance for the future as its main theme.

The school is a full member of the Association of Professional Schools of International Affairs (APSIA), a group of schools of public policy, public administration, and international studies.

== Graduate degrees ==
The school offers five postgraduate degree programmes. They are:

- Master in Public Policy (MPP) – two-year programme
- Master in International Affairs (MIA) – two-year programme
- Master in Public Administration (MPA) – one-year programme
- Master in Public Administration and Management (MPAM, conducted in Chinese)

It also offers a PhD in Public Policy and the Lee Kuan Yew Senior Fellowship in Public Service Programme.

=== Double degrees ===
Both MPP and MPA students may choose to pursue a double degree with NUS Business School (MBA).

As a member of the Global Public Policy Network (GPPN), students from its MPP programme have the opportunity to enroll in a dual degree programme with either the School of International and Public Affairs, Columbia University, London School of Economics, University of Tokyo.

== Research ==
The LKY School has built up research expertise in four core areas principally, which are key areas of public policy challenges in Asia in the years and decades ahead. The four baskets of research focus are:

- Policy Studies, Public Management and Governance
- Social Policy
- International Relations and Global Governance
- Economic Development and Competitiveness

The LKY School has three research centres, providing research on the latest developments in public policy. These are:

=== Asia Competitiveness Institute ===
The Asia Competitiveness Institute (ACI) was established in 2006 to build the intellectual leadership and network for understanding and developing competitiveness in the ASEAN region. ACI seeks to contribute to the enhancement of economic growth and living standards in the region. It serves as a regional repository of competitiveness information that enables analyses of long-term trends in economic policies and development. It conducts research to understand patterns of policy and economic development, and develops models that are applicable to different contexts. It also undertakes projects to assess current competitiveness of key economic clusters and provide policy inputs for enhancing growth. The ACI is an affiliated institute of the Institute for Strategy and Competitiveness at Harvard University.

=== Centre on Asia and Globalisation ===
The Centre on Asia and Globalisation (CAG) was established in 2006 to analyse the management of global issues and Asia's role in a rapidly changing and integrating world. Within this broad context, CAG has mapped out two initial areas of research: the mechanisms of global governance, and energy governance. The centre's research on global governance investigates a variety of innovative approaches to managing global issues, including: transparency and information; the public roles of the private sector; and inter-governmental organisations. The energy governance programme examines the policies and institutions needed to bring about a shift to a more effective, efficient, and sustainable global energy system, with a focus on the role of Asia in shaping globalisation forces.

=== Institute for Environment and Sustainability ===
The Institute for Environment and Sustainability (IES) at the Lee Kuan Yew School of Public Policy is a university-based centre focused on research and policy engagement related to sustainability. IES builds on the work of its predecessor, the Institute for Water Policy (IWP), which was established in 2008 and conducted research on water science and public policy, behavioural studies, water economics, and water governance. IWP has since been renamed the Centre for Water Policy.

=== Former affiliations ===
==== Institute of Policy Studies ====
The Institute of Policy Studies (IPS) is a think-tank dedicated to fostering good governance in Singapore through strategic policy research. It focuses on Singapore's domestic developments and external relations taking a multidisciplinary approach with an emphasis on long-term strategic thinking. Established in 1988, IPS became an institute within the Lee Kuan Yew School of Public Policy in 2008. As of 1 April, 2026, IPS became a university-level research institute within NUS.

== Publications ==
The LKY School publishes a number of research papers, journals and books. Two flagship publications are:

- Policy and Society
- Global-is-Asian

=== Policy and Society ===
Policy and Society is edited by faculty members Professors Michael Howlett and M Ramesh along with Professors Giliberto Capano (University of Bologna) and Darryl Jarvis (Hong Kong Institute of Education). It is a SSCI-listed journal that ranks 9th on the SCImago Journal Rankings (SJR Indicator) in the field of public administration.

=== Global-is-Asian ===
Global-is-Asian is the school's flagship digital platform focusing on policy issues affecting Asia and the world. Backed by research and grounded in practitioners' experience, its content aims to shape global thinking and steer meaningful conversations on Asian policy issues, especially among policymakers and academics.

=== Other publications ===
==== Asian Journal of Public Affairs ====
The Asian Journal of Public Affairs is a biannual academic journal covering public affairs issues pertaining to Asia and the Oceania region. It is edited by graduate students from the Lee Kuan Yew School of Public Policy at the National University of Singapore. The journal's scope includes, but is not limited to, public policy, public management, international relations, international political economy, and economics. Each issue features scholarly submissions, case studies, book reviews, and commentaries.

The journal was established in July 2007, featuring an editorial from Kishore Mahbubani, dean of the Lee Kuan Yew School of Public Policy, among full-length articles from graduate students in the UK, US, China, and Singapore. A printed version was started with the launch of the 5th issue by Kofi Annan in April 2009.

== Distinguished Speakers Series ==
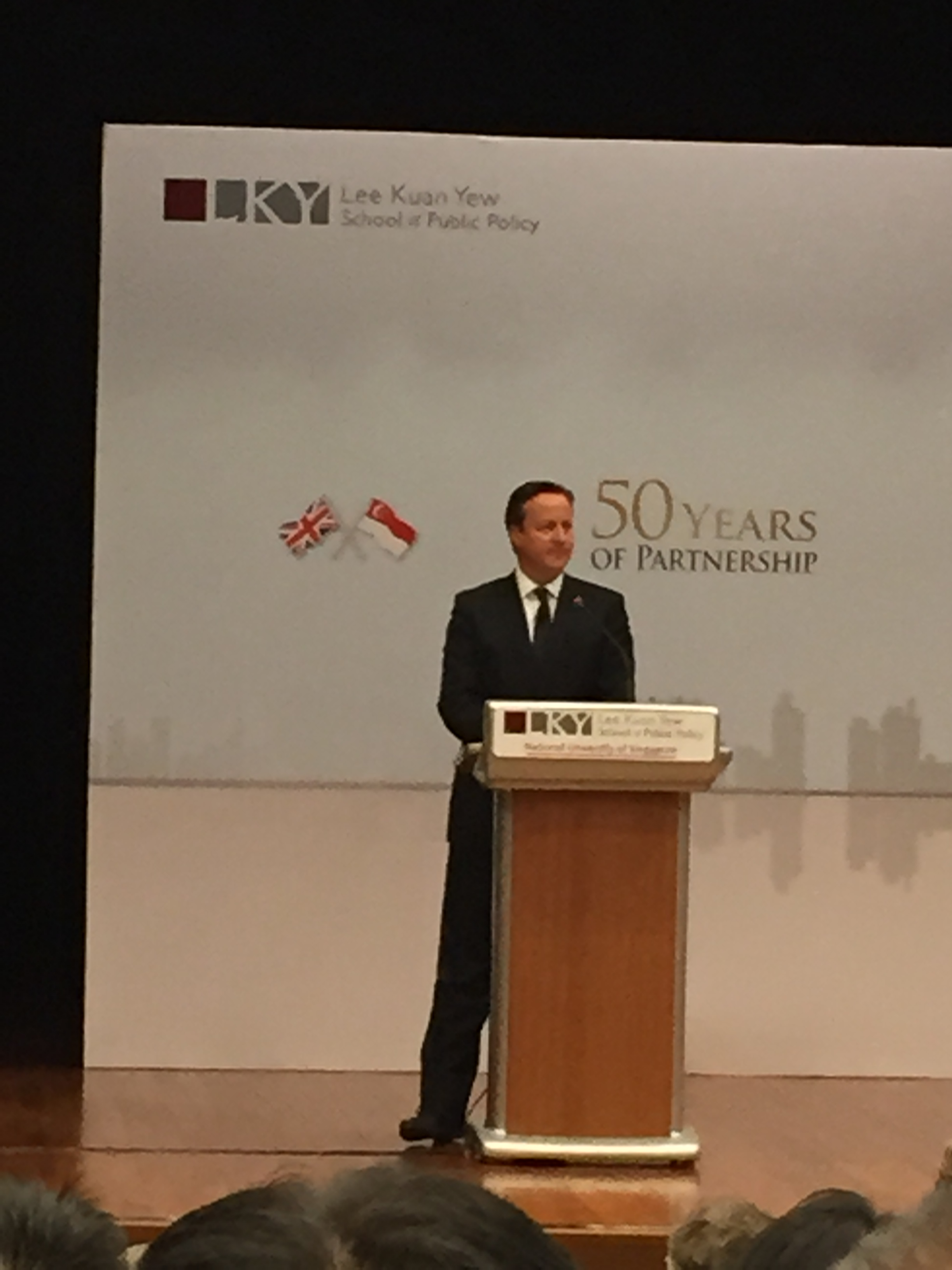
David Cameron, the prime minister of the United Kingdom, speaking at the school in July 2015

LKY School hosts conferences and lectures for its students as well as the wider public. Visitors who have spoken at the school include former UN Secretary-General Kofi Annan, former UK prime minister Tony Blair, former Australia Prime Minister Kevin Rudd, Pulitzer prize-winning author Thomas Friedman, Nobel laureates Elinor Ostrom, Amartya Sen, Muhammad Yunus, Aung San Suu Kyi, and former US Federal Reserve Chairman Paul Volcker.

In 2019, the Lee Kuan Yew School of Public Policy organised the Asia Thinker Series, a series of leadership events. This series of forums involving academic experts, policymakers and business leaders from Asia, focuses on key contemporary public policy issues and the emerging challenges of Asia's influence in the world. The series took place in Jakarta discussing "Indonesia in the Global Trade War: Impacts on Business, Global Trade and Investment". The topic of the second forum in Bangkok revolved around "ASEAN and the New World Disorder: Thailand, seeking a new balance". The third Asia Thinker Series forum was to be held in Delhi, India, in November 2019.

== Aranda chatbot ==
In 2018, the school's Thought leadership & Strategic Communications team Social Media team launched a Facebook Chatbot named Aranda. Aranda was named after the orchid, Aranda Lee Kuan Yew and serves the school in its admissions application process. The project won a gold award in Marketing Interactive's Loyalty and Engagement Awards in 2019.

== Notable alumni ==
The Lee Kuan Yew School of Public Policy has over 3,600 alumni in more than 90 countries. The alumni have gone on to become government officials, diplomats and social entrepreneurs, across the public, private and non-profit sectors.

There are 20 alumni chapters around the world, including in Beijing, Shanghai, Indonesia, Malaysia, Philippines, India, the United States and Europe.

=== Politics, government and public service ===
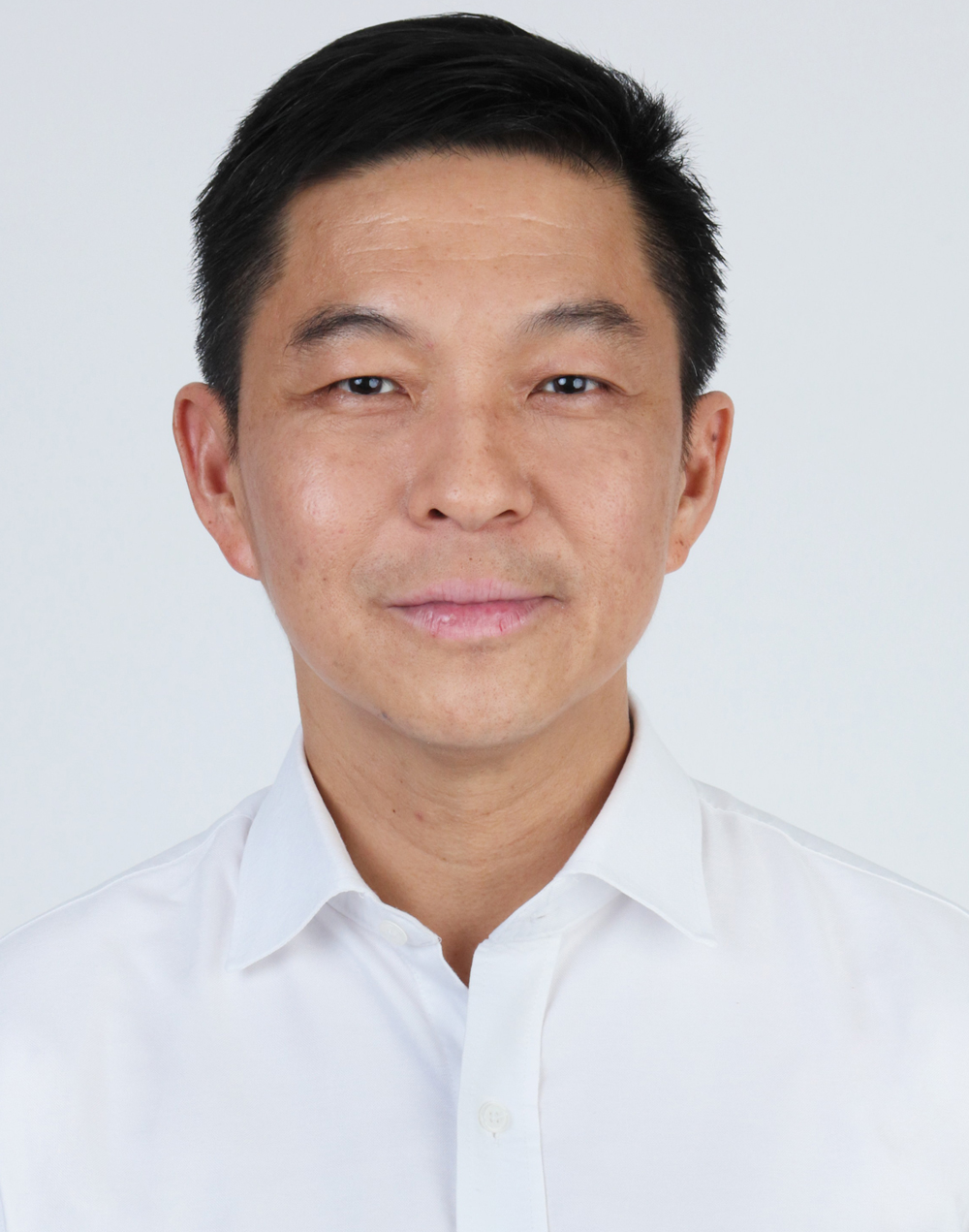
- Tan Chuan-Jin, 8th Speaker of the Parliament of Singapore
  Tan Chuan-Jin – Former Speaker of Parliament, former member of Parliament for Marine Parade GRC
- Darryl David – Member of Parliament for Ang Mo Kio GRC
- Don Wee – Member of Parliament for Chua Chu Kang GRC
- Kwok Fook Seng – Singapore High Commissioner to Australia
- Carrie Tan – Member of Parliament for Nee Soon GRC
- Aubeck Kam Tse Tsuen – Permanent Secretary at the Ministry of Social and Family Development
- Jack Sim – founder of the World Toilet Organization
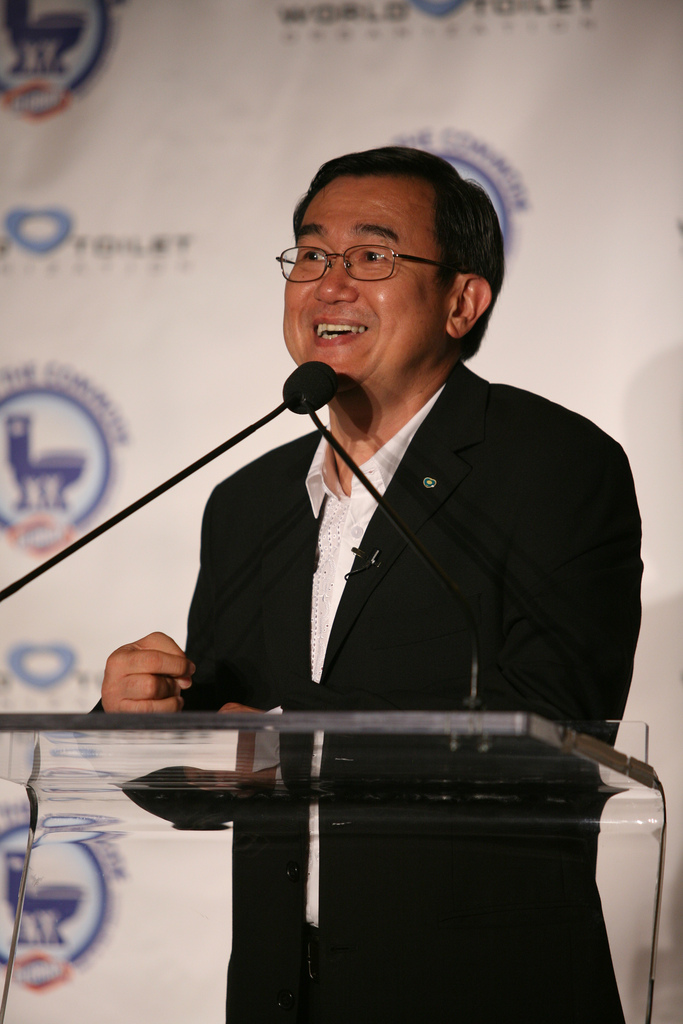
  Jack Sim, Founder of World Toilet Organisation

=== Judicial ===
- See Kee Oon – Judge of the Supreme Court of Singapore
- Aedit Bin Abdullah – Judge of the Supreme Court of Singapore
- Hoo Sheau Peng – Judge of the Supreme Court of Singapore

=== Foreign ===
- Ugyen Dorji, minister for labour and human resources, Bhutan
- Chang Lih Kang – Member of the Malaysian Parliament
- Wong Shu Qi – Member of the Malaysian Parliament
- Amar Patnaik – Member of the Indian Parliament
- Sufian Sabtu – Deputy Minister at the Brunei Prime Minister's Office

=== Business ===
- Pushpanathan Sundram – CEO of PublicPolicyAsia Advisors
- Elizabeth Tan – founder of Sight to Sky

=== Media ===
- Martino Tan – Managing Editor of Mothership

Alumni Award 2011

In 2011, NUS and LKYSPP awarded its inaugural Outstanding Alumni Award to H.E. Pushpanathan Sundram, Deputy Secretary-General of ASEAN for ASEAN Economic Community in recognition of his contributions in promoting good governance and public policy.

=== Alumni Awards 2018 ===
In March 2018, the alumni relations team have given the LKYSPP Outstanding Alumni Award and LKYSPP Service Alumni Award through nomination.

==== LKYSPP Outstanding Award ====
- Jack Sim – founder of the World Toilet Organization

==== LKYSPP Service Award ====
- Wang Kejian – Chairman of City Construction Press, China

== Campus ==
The LKY School is situated at the Bukit Timah campus together with the NUS Law Faculty, next to the Singapore Botanic Gardens. It is based primarily in the Manasseh Meyer and Oei Tiong Ham buildings. The NUS Bukit Timah campus was built in the 1920s in order to facilitate the Raffles College, and later served as headquarters of Japanese Army during the Japanese occupation. The site became the campus for the Singapore Division of University of Malaya in 1949, then the University of Singapore in 1962, and the merged National University of Singapore (NUS) in 1980.

After NUS moved its campus to Kent Ridge, the site served as the campus of the National Institute of Education and Singapore Management University (SMU), respectively. After SMU moved into their permanent campus at Bras Basah in 2005, the campus was returned to NUS, and became the campus for NUS Law School and the LKY School in the following year.

== See also ==
- Kanti Bajpai
- Kishore Mahbubani
- Danny Quah
- Institute of Policy Studies
- National University of Singapore
