= Sulabh International Museum of Toilets =

Museum in New Delhi, India

Coordinates: 28.5966°N 77.0808°E

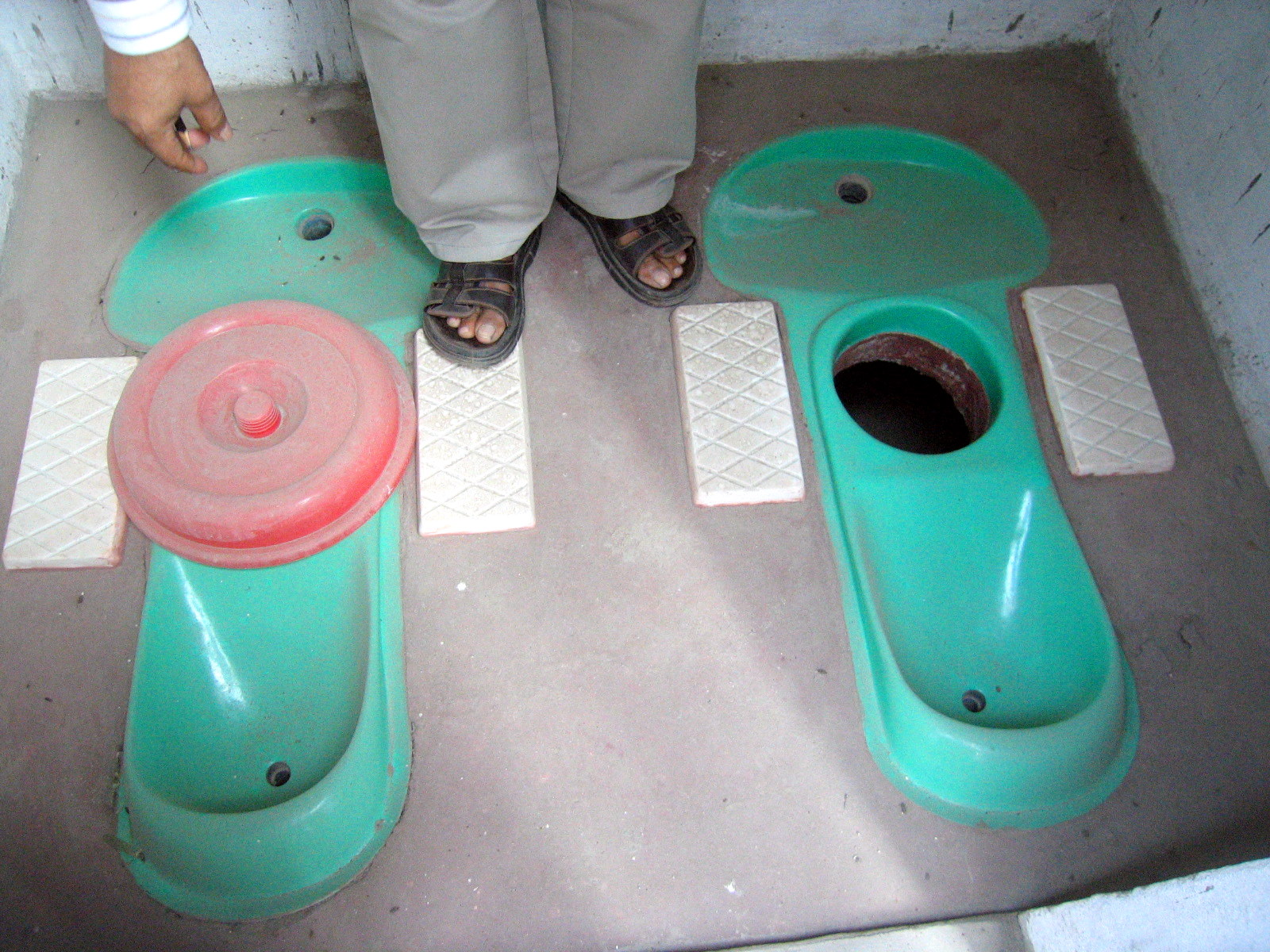
- Example of two ecosan toilet squatting pans, found in a Sulabh complex in India
- Established: 1992
- Location: Delhi, India
- Website: sulabhtoiletmuseum.org

The Sulabh International Museum of Toilets in Delhi is run by the Sulabh International, dedicated to the global history of sanitation and toilets. According to Time magazine, the museum is one of the weirdest museums among the "10 museums around the world that are anything but mundane". It was established in 1992 by Dr. Bindeshwar Pathak, a social activist, founder of Sulabh Sanitation and Social Reform Movement, recipient of national and international awards including the Stockholm Water Prize in 2009. His objective in establishing this museum was to highlight the need to address the problems of the sanitation sector in the country, considering the efforts made in various parts of the world in this field since the third millennium BCE.

== Features ==
Established in 1992, the museum has exhibits from 50 countries. Sanitation artifacts, spanning from 3000 BC through the end of the 20th Century, are arranged chronologically: "Ancient, Medieval and Modern."

The museum's exhibits bring out the development of toilet-related technology of the entire gamut of human history. Over time, they highlight social habits, etiquette specific to the existing sanitary situation, and their legal framework. The items on display include privies, chamber pots, decorated Victorian toilet seats, toilet furniture, bidets and water closets in vogue since from 1145 AD to the present. Display boards have poetry related to toilets and their use.

Some of the interesting and amusing objects and information charts on display are: a reproduction of a commode in the form of treasure chest of the British medieval period; a reproduction of the supposed toilet of King Louis XIV which is reported to have been used by the king to defecate while holding court; a toilet camouflaged in the form of a bookcase; information on the technology transfer from Russia to NASA to convert urine into potable water, a deal of $19 million; display boards with comics, jokes and cartoons related to humour on toilets; toilet pots made of gold and silver used by the Roman emperors; information about flush pot designed in 1596 by Sir John Harington during Queen Elizabeth I's regime; the sewerage system that existed during the Harappan Civilization; and historical information from the Lothal archeological site on the development of toilets during the Indus Valley civilization.

== See also ==
- Haewoojae
- Toilet History Museum
