= WTO (disambiguation) =

WTO or World Trade Organization is an organization that intends to supervise and liberalize international trade.

WTO may also refer to:

- Warsaw Treaty Organization or Warsaw Pact
- Westona railway station, Melbourne
- World Toilet Organization, a non-profit organisation based in Singapore
- World Tourism Organization
- WTO (Deus Ex), a fictional organization in Deus Ex: Invisible War
- "WTO", a song by Pennywise from Land of the Free?
