= World Toilet Day =

United Nations holiday on 19 November

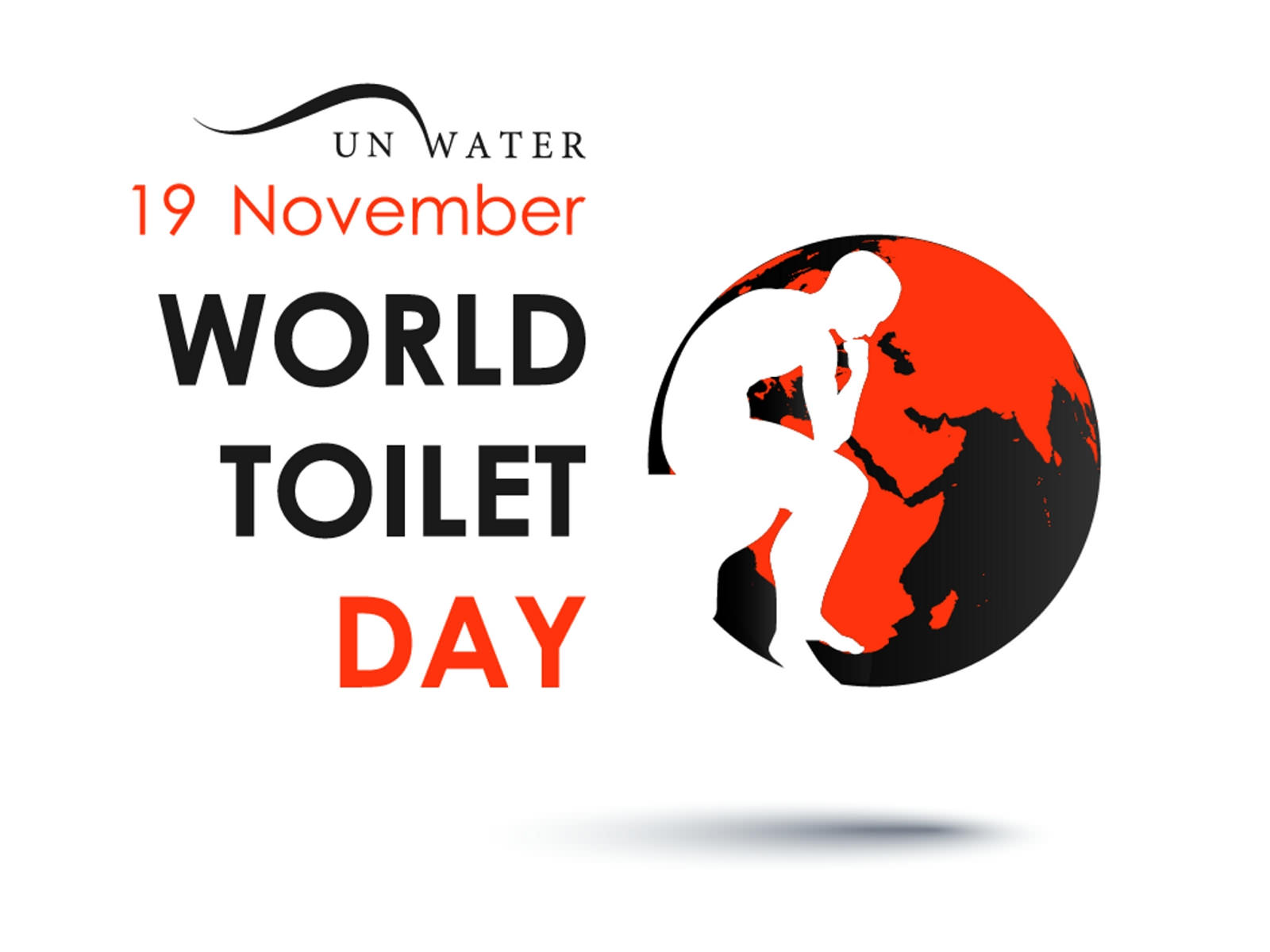
- Logo of World Toilet Day
- Observed by: worldwide
- Date: 19 November
- Frequency: annual
- First time: 19 November 2001 (unofficially) and 19 November 2012 (as an official UN Day)
- Related to: UN-Water (convener), World Toilet Organization (initiator)

World Toilet Day (WTD) is an official United Nations international observance day on 19 November to inspire action to tackle the global sanitation crisis. Worldwide, 3.4 billion people live without "safely managed sanitation" and around 354 million people practice open defecation. Sustainable Development Goal 6 aims to "Ensure availability and sustainable management of water and sanitation for all". In particular, target 6.2 is to "End open defecation and provide access to sanitation and hygiene". When the Sustainable Development Goals Report 2020 was published, United Nations Secretary-General António Guterres said, "Today, Sustainable Development Goal 6 is badly off track" and it "is hindering progress on the 2030 Agenda, the realization of human rights and the achievement of peace and security around the world".

World Toilet Day exists to inform, engage and inspire people to take action toward achieving this goal. The UN General Assembly declared World Toilet Day an official UN day in 2013, after Singapore had tabled the resolution (its first resolution before the UN's General Assembly of 193 member states). Prior to that, World Toilet Day had been established unofficially by the World Toilet Organization (a Singapore-based NGO) in 2001.

UN-Water is the official convener of World Toilet Day. UN-Water maintains the official World Toilet Day website and chooses a special theme for each year. In 2020 the theme was "Sustainable sanitation and climate change". In 2019 the theme was 'Leaving no one behind', which is the central theme of the Sustainable Development Goals. Themes in previous years include nature-based solutions, wastewater, toilets and jobs, and toilets and nutrition. World Toilet Day is marked by communications campaigns and other activities. Events are planned by UN entities, international organizations, local civil society organizations and volunteers to raise awareness and inspire action.

Toilets are important because access to a safe functioning toilet has a positive impact on public health, human dignity, and personal safety, especially for females. Sanitation systems that do not safely treat excreta (urine and feces) allow for the spread of disease. Serious soil-transmitted diseases and waterborne diseases such as cholera, diarrhea, typhoid, dysentery and schistosomiasis can result.

== Convener ==
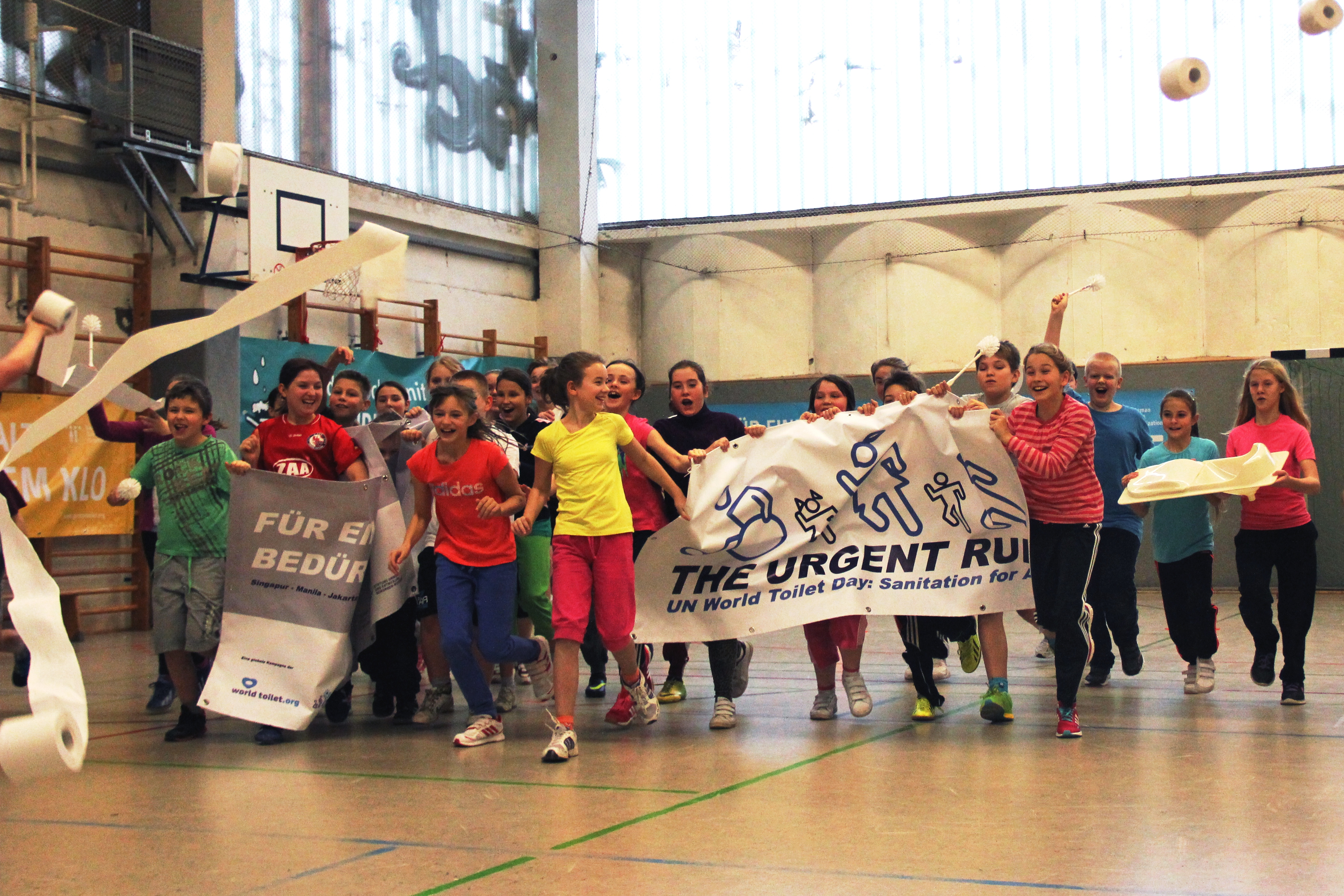
School children in Germany running the "Urgent Run" to celebrate World Toilet Day 2014

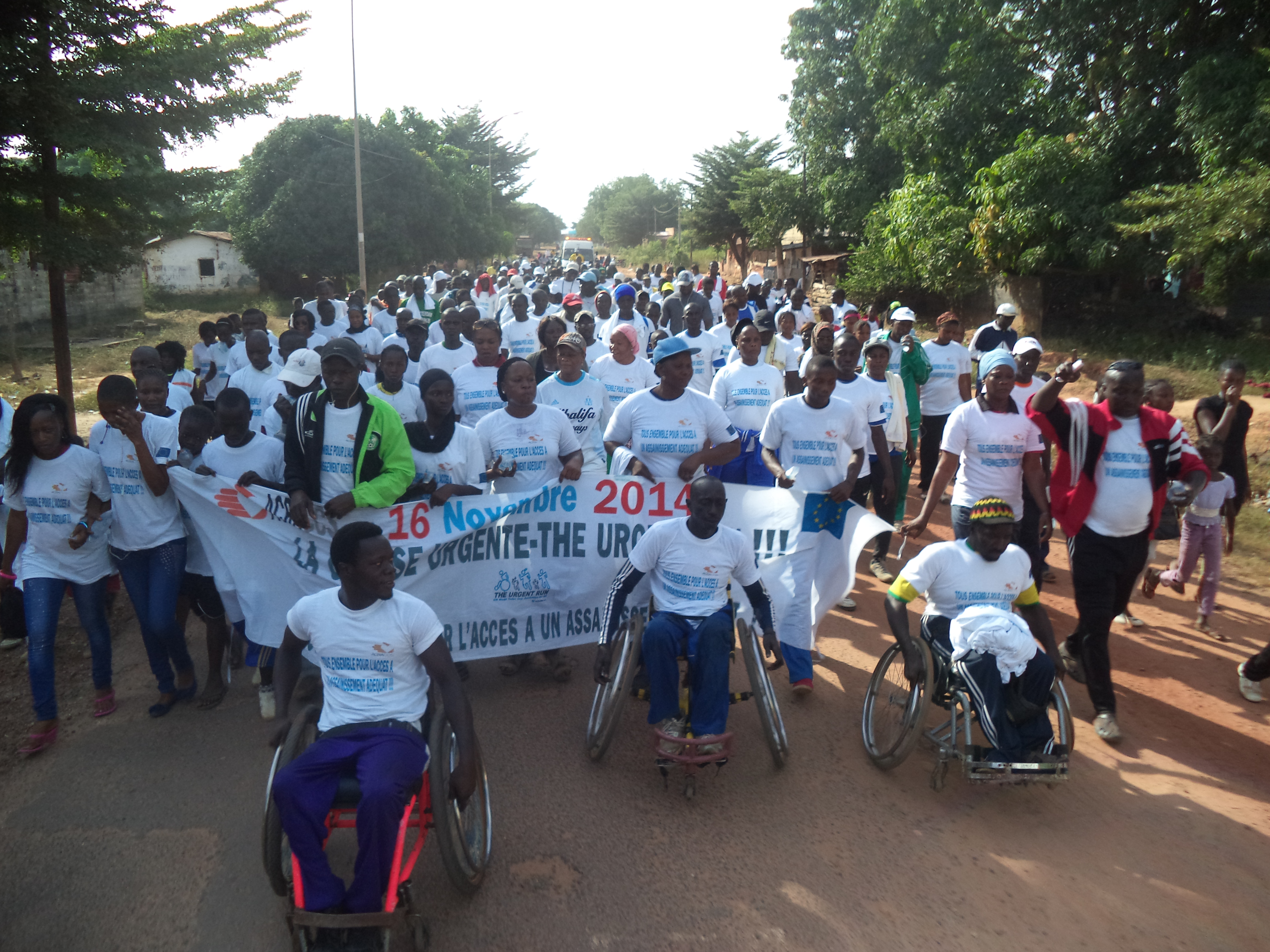
World Toilet Day 2014 "Urgent Run" in Senegal

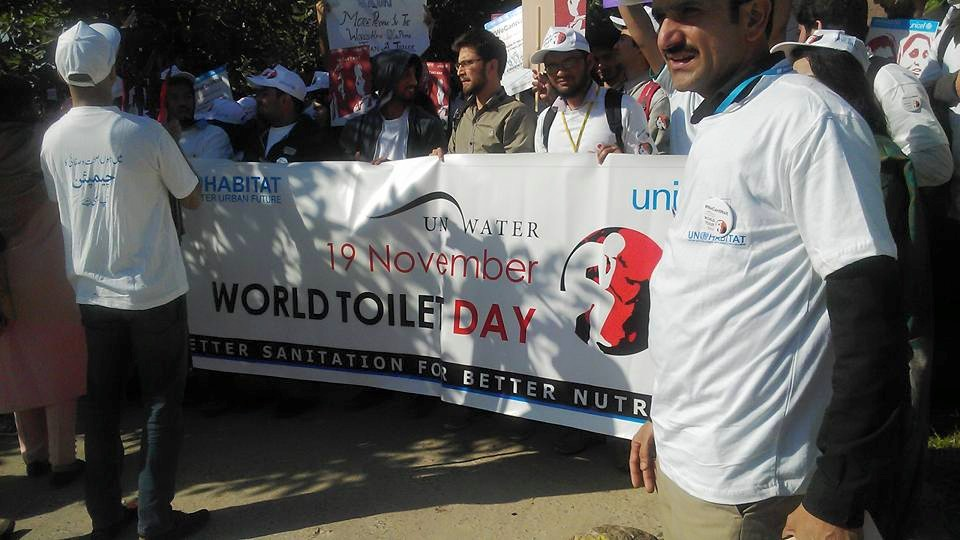
Celebrating World Toilet Day 2015 in Pakistan

In 2013, UN-Water and the "Thematic Priority Area (TPA) on Drinking Water and Basic Sanitation" received the mandate to oversee World Toilet Day each year. This mandate is described in the United Nations Resolution A/67/L.75.

In consultation with the UN-Water World Toilet Day Task Force, made up of UN-Water member organizations, UN-Water selects the theme based on that year's World Water Development Report and develops content for World Toilet Day communications campaigns.

UN-Water manages the World Toilet Day website which promotes key issues and stories, provides communications and campaigns resources, and announces events and opportunities to participate.

The overall World Toilet Day campaign mobilizes civil society, think tanks, non-governmental organizations, academics, corporations and the general public to participate in the associated social media and communications campaigns. Ultimately, the aim is to encourage organizations and governments to plan activities and action on sanitation issues to make progress on Sustainable Development Goal 6.

== Annual themes ==
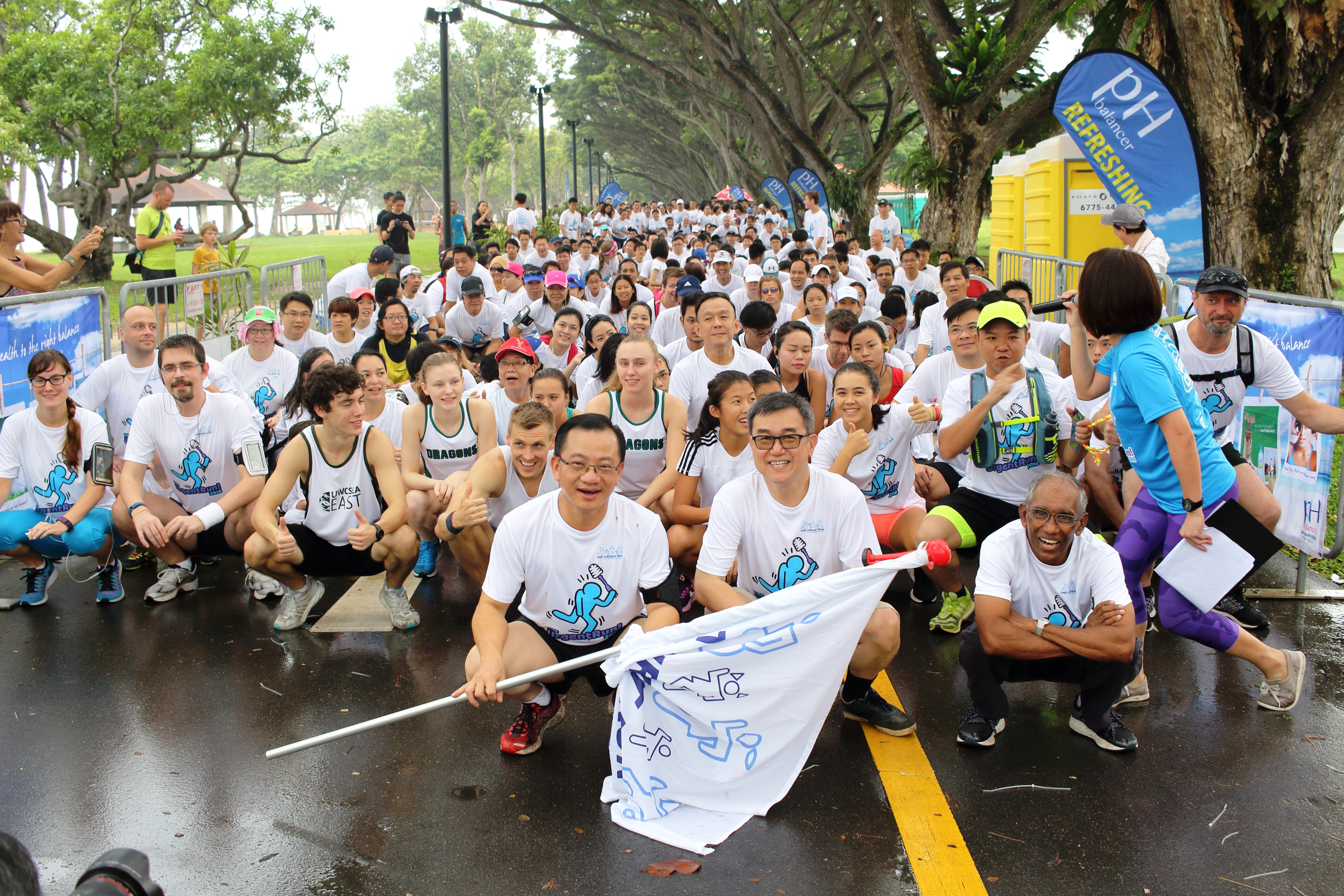
Leading "The Big Squat" during the Singapore "Urgent Run" 2016 is Jack Sim, front row left, founder of World Toilet Organization.

Since 2012, each World Toilet Day has been given a theme. Since 2016, the same overall annual theme has been used for both World Toilet Day and World Water Day, based on the World Water Development Report.

- 2012 – "I give a shit, do you?"
- 2013 – Tourism and water
- 2014 – Equality and dignity
- 2015 – Toilets and nutrition
- 2016 – Toilets and jobs
- 2017 – Wastewater
- 2018 – Nature-based solutions (slogan: "When Nature calls")
- 2019 – Leaving no one behind – The campaign draws attention to those people being "left behind without sanitation and the social, economic and environmental consequences of inaction". This is closely related to Sustainable Development Goal 6 which has a target to eliminate open defecation and ensure "everyone has access to sustainable sanitation services by 2030, paying special attention to the needs of women and girls and those in vulnerable situations".
- 2020 – Sustainable sanitation and climate change
- 2021 – Valuing toilets: The WTO and Bill Gates both believe that if value can be given to toilet waste, then funds will be generated to pay for any cleanup including profits for entrepreneurs interested in investing in related industries.
- 2022 – Groundwater and sanitation – making the invisible visible.
- 2023 – Accelerating Change
- 2024 – Toilets are a place for peace.
- 2025 – Sanitation in a changing world
- 2026 – Safe toilets. Equal futures.

== Examples of activities and events ==
=== Launch of reports ===
Some organizations launch toilet-related (or sanitation-related) reports on World Toilet Day. For example:

- The Toilet Board Coalition (2017) "Sanitation Economy"
- Water and Sanitation for the Urban Poor (WSUP) (2017) "Guide to strengthening the enabling environment for faecal sludge management"
- The International Labour Office (ILO) (2016) "WASH@Work: self-training handbook"
- WHO, UNICEF and USAID (2015) "Improving Nutrition Outcomes with Better Water, Sanitation and Hygiene: Practical Solutions for Policies and Programmes"

=== Events ===
- 2012: The Gates Foundation held a “Reinventing the Toilet" fair.
- 2019: Planned events for World Toilet Day 2019 include for example a workshop in the USA entitled "Manure Management – What Poop Can Teach Youth!", art installations in Ireland under the theme "Think Before You Flush", and a "Toilets for all Campaign in Rural areas" in Madhya Pradesh, India.
- 2018: Events for World Toilet Day in 2018 included diverse activities such as a 'hackathon' in Ghana to promote digital solutions, a seminar hosted by Engineers without Borders in Denmark, a screening and discussion of the Bollywood movie Toilet: Ek Prem Katha (in English – Toilet: A Love Story) in Canada, and a school drawing competition in India.
- 2017: Members of the Sustainable Sanitation Alliance (SuSanA) used the momentum around World Toilet Day in 2017 to update Wikipedia articles on WASH-related topics. This contributed to public education about the sanitation crisis. The documentary "Follow the Flush," released 19 November 2017, educated people about what happens beneath the streets of New York City after a person flushes a toilet in Manhattan. In the lead-up to World Toilet Day 2017, communities worldwide came together for sanitation-themed "Urgent Runs". More than 63 events were held in 42 countries. Events included fun runs, awareness walks, toilet cleaning programs, carnivals and even motorbike parades. Countries participating include: Bangladesh, Benin, Bhutan, Burundi, Cambodia, Cameroon, Canada, China, Congo-Brazzaville, France, Gambia, Germany, Ghana, India, Indonesia, Italy, Kenya, Mongolia, Mozambique, Namibia, Netherlands, Pakistan, Philippines, Senegal, Tanzania, United States and Vietnam.

== Impacts ==
=== Social media impacts ===
The World Toilet Day campaign and related publications reach millions of people through social media, dedicated websites and other channels. Over 100 events in 40 countries were registered on the World Toilet Day website in both 2016 and in 2017. In 2017, the hashtag #WorldToiletDay had a maximum potential reach of over 750 million people on social media. In 2018, the maximum potential reach increased by 15%, compared to 2017; the online activity and authors also increased by 12% and 22% compared to 2017, respectively.

== History ==
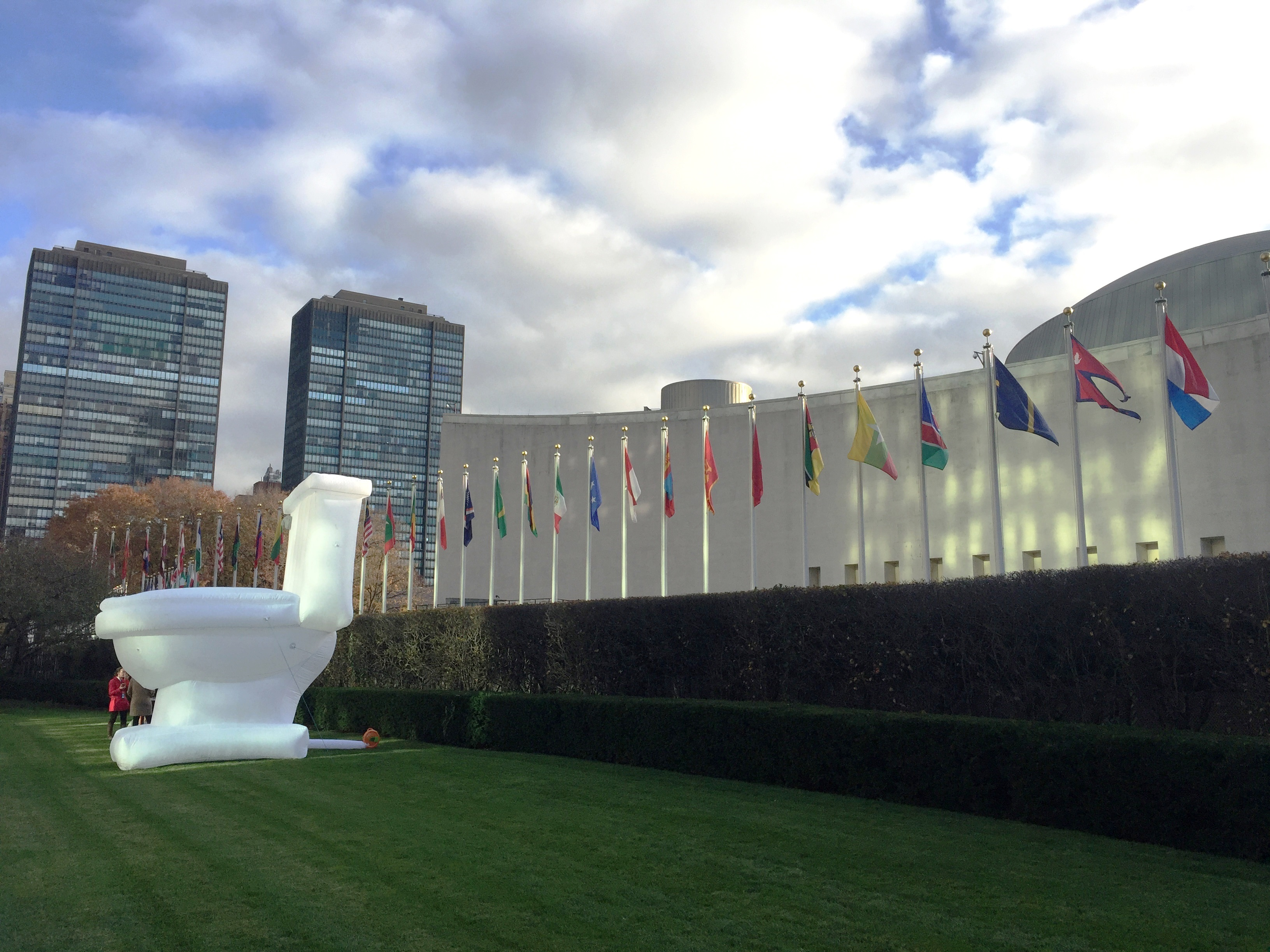
World Toilet Day officially declared in 2013 at the 67th session of the UN General Assembly in New York

On 19 November 2001, the NGO World Toilet Organization (WTO) was founded by Jack Sim, a philanthropist from Singapore. He subsequently declared 19 November as World Toilet Day. The name "World Toilet Day" and not "World Sanitation Day" was chosen for ease of public messaging, even though toilets are only the first stage of sanitation systems.

World Toilet Day events and public awareness campaigns increase public awareness of the broader sanitation systems that include wastewater treatment, fecal sludge management, municipal solid waste management, stormwater management, hygiene, and handwashing. Also, the UN Sustainable Development Goals call for more than just toilets. Goal 6 calls for adequate sanitation, which includes the whole system for assuring that waste is safely processed.

The WTO began pushing for global recognition for World Toilet Day and, in 2007, the Sustainable Sanitation Alliance (SuSanA) also began to actively support World Toilet Day. Their efforts to raise attention for the sanitation crisis were bolstered in 2010 when the human right to water and sanitation was officially declared a human right by the UN.

In 2013, a joint initiative between the Government of Singapore and the World Toilet Organization led to Singapore's first ever UN resolution, named "Sanitation for All". The resolution calls for collective action to end the world's sanitation crisis. World Toilet Day was declared an official UN day in 2013. That resolution was adopted by 122 countries at the 67th session of the UN General Assembly in New York.

The Sustainable Development Goals (SDGs) replaced the Millennium Development Goals (MDGs) in 2016. On World Toilet Day on 19 November 2015, United Nations Secretary-General Ban Ki-moon urged broad action to renew efforts to provide access to adequate sanitation for all. He reminded everyone of the "Call to Action on Sanitation" which was launched in 2013, and the aim to end open defecation by 2025. He also said: "By many accounts, sanitation is the most-missed target of the Millennium Development Goals."

The UN Deputy Secretary-General, Jan Eliasson, was honored on World Toilet Day in 2016 in New York for his deep commitment to breaking the sanitation taboo. For example, he had delivered a video message to attendees of a WaterAid and Unilever joint event in the European Parliament on World Toilet Day 2014. In 2016, UN-Water supported "A Toast for Toilets" in New York with the United Nations Mission of Singapore.

== Background ==
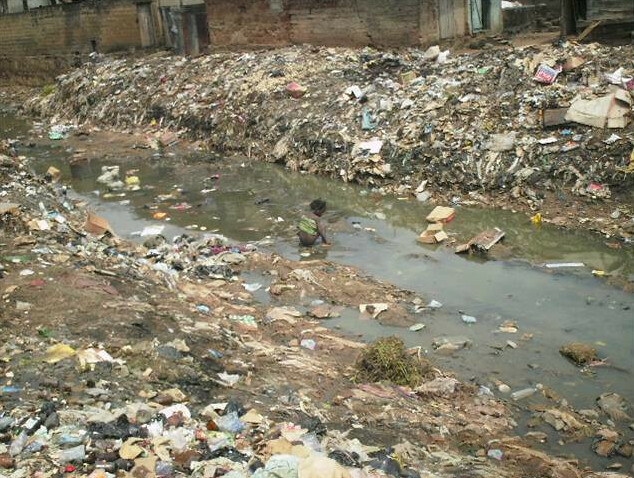
Child defecating in a canal in the slum of Gege in the city of Ibadan, Nigeria

Worldwide, 3.4 billion people live without "safely managed sanitation" and around 354 million people practice open defecation. Having to urinate in the open can also be difficult for women and girls. Females tend to resort to the cover of darkness to give them more privacy, but then risk being attacked when alone at night.

It has been estimated that 58% of all cases of diarrhea worldwide in 2015 were caused by unsafe water, poor sanitation and poor hygiene practices, such as inadequate handwashing. This resulted in half a million children under the age of five dying from diarrhea per year. Providing sanitation has been estimated to lower the odds of children suffering diarrhea by 7–17%, and under-five mortality by 5–20%.

The Human Right to Water and Sanitation was recognized as a human right by the United Nations (UN) General Assembly on 28 July 2010. Lack of access to sanitation (toilets) has an impact on public health, dignity, and safety. The spread of many diseases (e.g. soil-transmitted helminthiasis, diarrhea, schistosomiasis) and stunted growth in children is directly related to people being exposed to human feces because toilets are either not available or not used.

Sustainable Development Goal 6 aims to provide sanitation for all.

== See also ==
- Bindeshwar Pathak, another toilet pioneer
- Brown Friday
- Global Handwashing Day
- Human right to water and sanitation
- Menstrual Hygiene Day
- WASH
- Water issues in developing countries
- Workers' right to access the toilet
