= Mr. Toilet =

- Directed by: Lily Zepeda
- Produced by: Lily Zepeda; Tchavdar Georgiev
- Starring: Jack Sim
- Release date: April 27, 2019 (Hot Docs)
- Running time: 87 minutes

Mr. Toilet: The World's #2 Man is a 2019 documentary film about Singaporean activist Jack Sim, who uses humour to publicize the issue of improving bathroom sanitation.

It had its world premiere at the Hot Docs Canadian International Documentary Festival on 27 April 2019, where it was named the winner of the Scotiabank Docs For Schools Student Choice Award.

Shown on Al Jazeera (English) T.V. channel, November 16, 2019.

== Cast ==
- Jack Sim
