= Sulabh International =

Indian social service organization

Sulabh International Social Service Organization
- Founded: 1970
- Type: Non-governmental organization
- Region served: India
- Revenue: 100000 per day
- Website: sulabhinternational.org

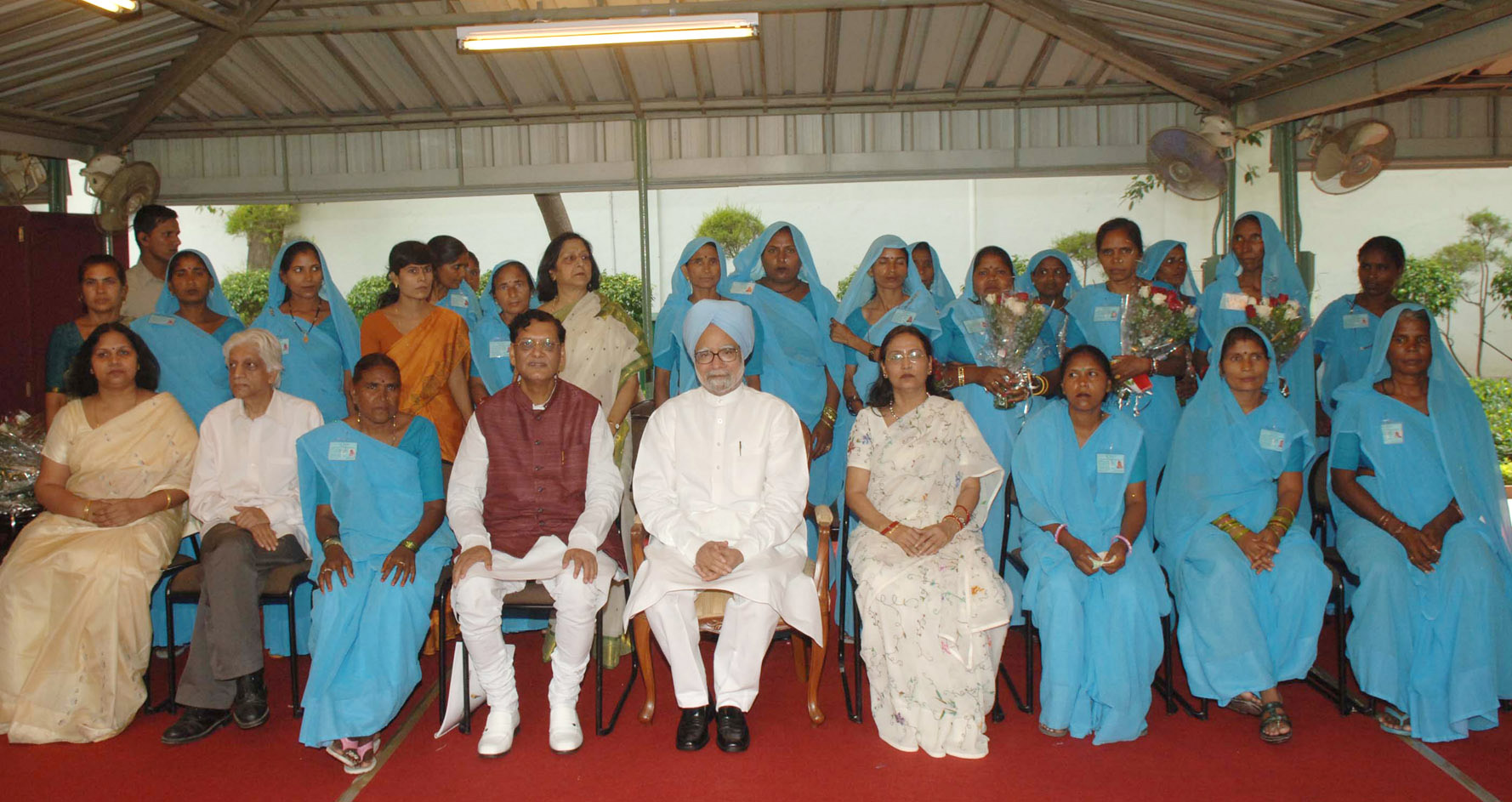
A delegation of sanitary workers from various parts of the country working with the Sulabh International with the Indian Prime Minister, Dr. Manmohan Singh, in New Delhi on 16 May 2006

Sulabh International is an India-based social service organization that works to promote human rights, environmental sanitation, non-conventional sources of energy, waste management and social reforms through education. The organization counts 50,000 volunteers. Sulabh International is the largest nonprofit organization in India.

== History ==
Sulabh was founded by Bindeshwar Pathak from the state of Bihar in 1970, and has 50,000 volunteers. Innovations include a scavenging-free two-pit pourflush toilet (Sulabh Shauchalaya); safe and hygienic on-site human waste disposal technology; a new concept of maintenance and construction of pay-&-use public toilets, popularly known as Sulabh Complexes with bath, laundry and urinal facilities being used by about ten million people every day and generates bio-gas and biofertilizer produced from excreta-based plants, low maintenance waste water treatment plants of medium capacity for institutions and industries. Other work includes setting up English-medium public school in New Delhi and also a network of centres all over the country to train boys and girls from poor families, specially scavengers, so that they can compete in open job market.

== Institution ==
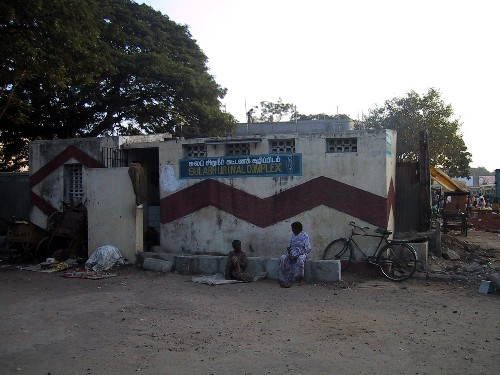
A Sulabh urinal complex in Chennai

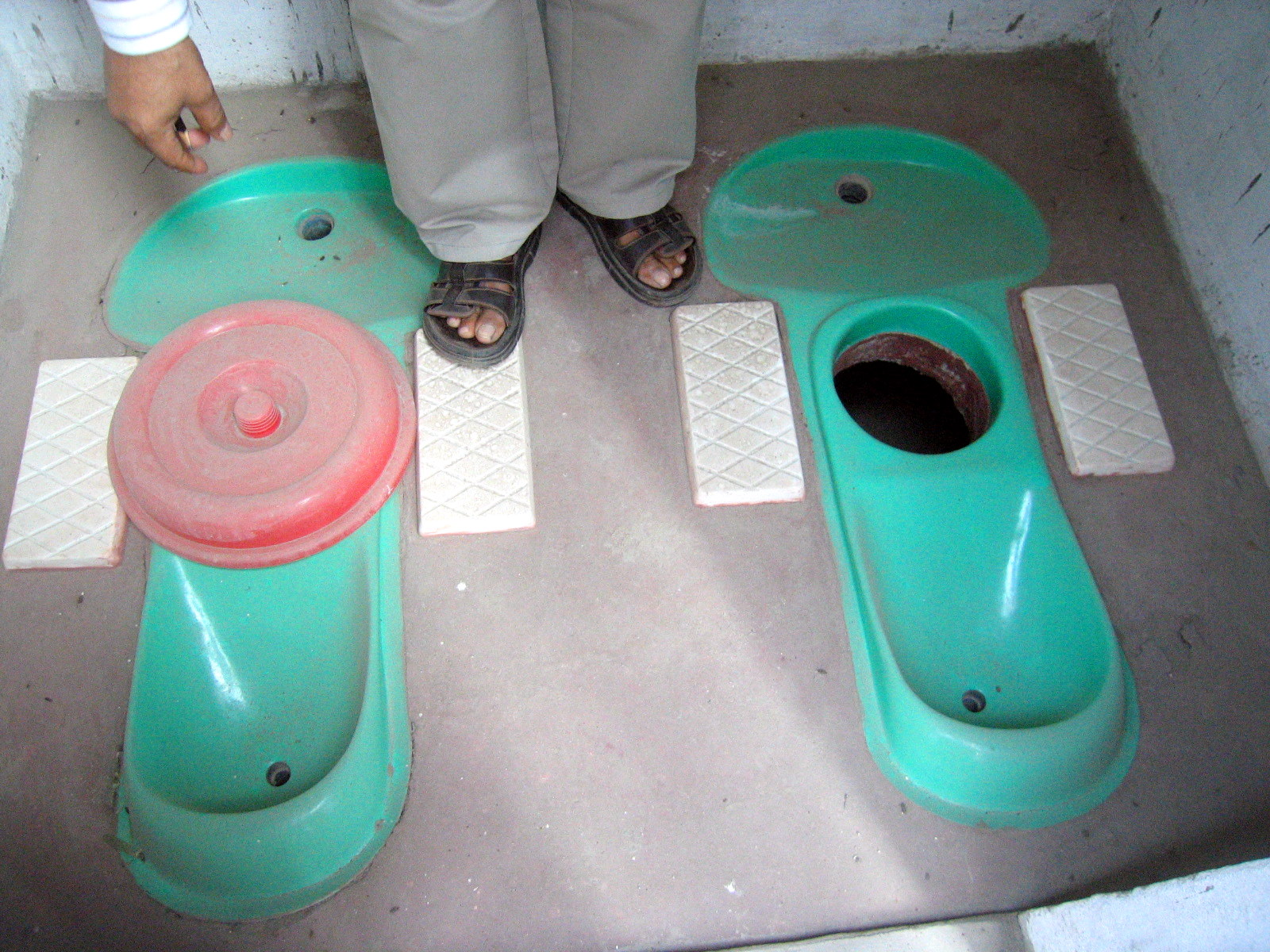
Example of two "ecosan" toilet slabs, found in a Sulabh complex in India

The United Nations Centre for Human Settlements has praised Sulabh's sanitation system as a global "Urban Best Practice" at the Habitat II conference held at Istanbul, Turkey, in June 1996. The Economic and Social Council of the United Nations granted Special Consultative Status to Sulabh in recognition of its work.

Sulabh claims their plan on human waste disposal and social reforms has provided jobs directly to 35,000 people, and has created 10,000,000 (1 crore) man-days, making 240 towns scavenging free.

Sulabh has established coordination with various national and international agencies, including British Council, USAID, BORDA, a German organisation, Commission of European Union, Belgium, GERES, France, CEEIC, HRIEE, China and Haskoning and Euroconsult, a Dutch firm.

Sulabh found mention in page 124 of the Human Development Index report for 2006. Sulabh was commended for bringing sanitation to the poor in India.

In October 2007, Sulabh announced the design of a cheap toilet system that recycles human waste into biogas and fertilizer.

Pathak has been conferred with the 2009 Stockholm Water Prize for his contributions towards his work. Sulabh International awarded Gandhi Peace Prize for year 2016 jointly with Akshaya Patra Foundation in 2019.

== Sulabh International Museum of Toilets ==
In Sulabh International's premises in Delhi, the company runs a museum dedicated to the history of sanitation and toilets.

== Criticism ==
The organization has been criticised by Mukul Sharma in his book Caste and Nature: Dalits and Indian Environmental Politics (2017). Sharma writes that the Brahmin and Gandhian activist Bindeshwar Pathak employs patronising and glorifying methods while dealing with caste based occupation like manual scavenging and sanitation work in general.

== See also ==
- World Toilet Organisation (WTO) - a similar NGO to Sulabh International
- Jack Sim founder of WTO
