= Brown Friday =

Friday following Thanksgiving in North America

- Date: Friday after Thanksgiving
- Frequency: Annual
- Country: United States

Brown Friday is a term commonly addressed to the Friday after Thanksgiving in the United States. The term was coined by plumbers who report a sudden increase in service calls that report clogged drains and broken garbage disposals happening directly after Thanksgiving.

Vic Fredlund, the service manager of Abacus Plumbing, believes this event to be caused by people "putting materials like starches, fibers, materials, things like that in the garbage disposal." Doyle James, the president of Mr. Rooter Plumbing, blames it on "the grease and the potato peels," and Paul Abrams, a spokesperson for Roto-Rooter also blames it on potato peels, as well as rice, stating: "People continue to peel potatoes over the sink and then push the peels down into the garbage disposal [...]. Rice [is also] consistent with big holiday meal prep," which all tend to clog drains and pipes, especially after Thanksgiving with the large amounts of waste it produces. Additionally, in a large gathering such as Thanksgiving, toilet pipes also tend to be clogged up by large amounts of toilet paper and wipes.

Major plumbing companies in North America report drastic increases in service requests. Mr. Rooter Plumbing report a 50% increase in service calls on Brown Friday. Roto-Rooter reports a 48–50% increase in service calls on Brown Friday. Bell Brothers report a "higher volume of calls."

== See also ==
- World Toilet Day
