= Water & Sanitation for Urban Populations =

International non-profit organization

Water & Sanitation for Urban Populations (WSUP)
- Formation: 2005
- Founders: Jeremy Pelczer & Richard Sandbrook
- Type: Nonprofit organization
- Headquarters: London
- Location: United Kingdom
- Website: www.wsup.com
- Formerly called: Water and Sanitation for the Urban Poor

Water & Sanitation for Urban Populations (WSUP), formerly known as Water & Sanitation for the Urban Poor, is an international non-profit organization dedicated to enhancing water and sanitation access in low-income urban communities across seven countries in Africa and Asia.

== History ==
WSUP was founded in 2005 by Jeremy Pelczer, former CEO Thames Water and the late Richard Sandbrook, co-founder of Friends of the Earth.

In 2005, four organisations namely; WaterAid, CARE International, Halcrow and Thames Water agreed to create WSUP as a non-profit organisation, limited by guarantee, registered in England & Wales, with each of these organisations becoming a Member and providing a Board Director. Within eighteen months they were joined by WWF, Water For People, Cranfield University, and Unilever, also became members.

The government of the United Kingdom through its Department for International Development (DFID), helped to guide the WSUP concept and was one of the first funders to support the initiative.

== Services ==
WSUP addresses the challenges of water and sanitation access in low-income urban communities by partnering with local service providers, utilities, municipalities, and the private sector. WSUP works to expand and improve these services, constructing vital infrastructure and securing funding for underserved communities.

== Awards and honors ==
- 2014 – Skoll Award For Social Entrepreneurship
- 2017 – Digital Innovation Award
- 2022 – Inclusion Award from AfricaSan

== See also ==
- World Water Day
- World Toilet Day
- Skoll Foundation
- WaterAid
- WASH
