= Restroom Association =

Non-profit non-governmental organisation

Restroom Association (Singapore)
- Abbreviation: RAS
- Formation: December 8, 1998; 26 years ago
- Founder: Jack Sim
- Registration no.: S98SS0167J
- Legal status: Foundation
- Purpose: Advocating clean toilets.
- Headquarters: Balestier Rd, Singapore 320002
- Coordinates: 1.3259°N 103.8429°E
- President: Mr Ho Chee Kit
- Website: https://www.toilet.org.sg/home

Restroom Association (Singapore) (RAS) is a non-profit, non-government organisation which was founded in 1998 by Jack Sim. The current president of the organisation is Mr Ho Chee Kit.

At RAS, they have four main pillars, namely, the Community, Outreach and Education, Research Development and Training, and Standards.

RAS strongly believes in advocating clean toilets for everyone.

== LOO Campaign ==
The LOO Campaign was launched at the Singapore Zoological Garden (Pavilion by the Lake) on 19 November 2008 to help target the owners, cleaners and users.

On 3 December 2010, a three-day LOO Carnival was organised by RAS and held at the National Library building.

== Notes ==
- "Call the Toilet Police," Electric New Paper
- "Catholic High Primary turns toilets into works of art" Channelnewsasia.com
