= Jack Sim =

Singaporean entrepreneur and philanthropist

- 沈锐华
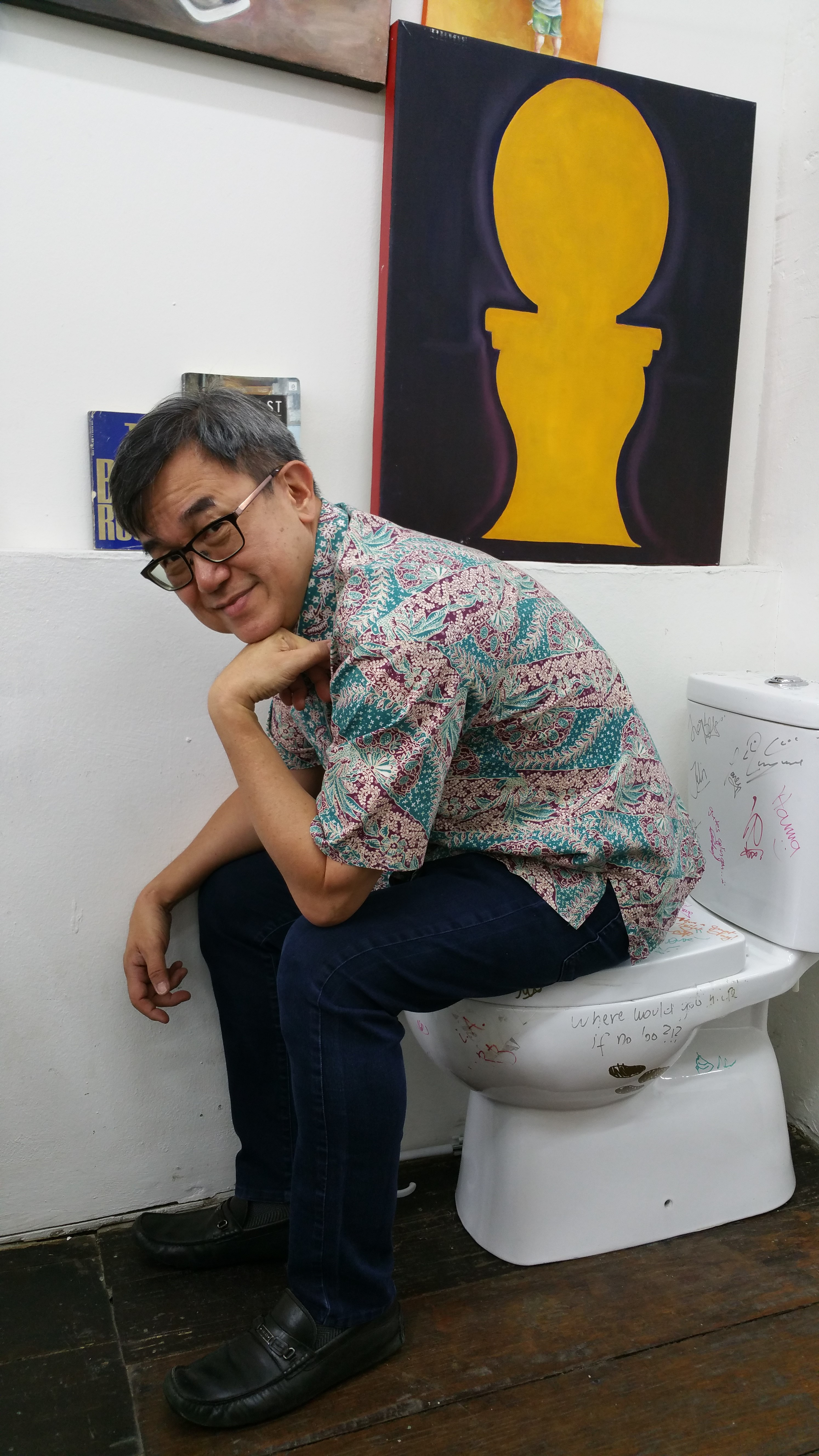
- Sim in 2015
- Born: Sim Juek Wah; 1957 (age 68–69); Colony of Singapore
- Education: Institute of Technical Education; Lee Kuan Yew School of Public Policy (MPA)
- Known for: Founding Restroom Association, World Toilet Organization, and World Toilet Day

Jack Sim Juek Wah (Note: Chinese: 沈锐华; Pe̍h-ōe-jī: Sím Jōe-hôa; pinyin: Shěn Ruìhuá) (born 1957), also known as Mr Toilet, is a Singaporean entrepreneur and philanthropist who is the founder of the World Toilet Organization and World Toilet Day initiative. He is also the founder of the Restroom Association of Singapore.

Sim started a number of successful business ventures before venturing into charitable work in his early forties. In 2001, he founded the World Toilet Organisation (WTO), an international non-governmental organisation for sanitation. After lobbying efforts with Singapore's Ministry of Foreign Affairs, the founding date of WTO was later adopted as World Toilet Day by the United Nations in 2012. Sim's leadership of the WTO includes humanitarian, developmental, and advocacy work for sanitation.

Sim graduated with a Master of Public Administration from the Lee Kuan Yew School of Public Policy at the National University of Singapore in 2011. He is currently an adjunct associate professor at the university's business school.

== Early life and education ==
Sim was born the second of three children in 1957 to a grocery store assistant and a beautician, Tan Siam Kheng. His family lived in an impoverished village in Upper Serangoon without a plumbing system. He studied at Kim Keat Primary School and Whitley Secondary School, doing poorly academically and later failing his O-level secondary school examinations. He attributes his academic difficulties to attention-deficit hyperactivity disorder. He later enrolled in the Vocational and Industrial Training Board (now the Institute of Technical Education), graduating with a certificate in hotel management.

As an adult, he completed professional courses from the University of Strathclyde and Harvard University. In 2013, he received a Masters of Public Administration degree from the Lee Kuan Yew School of Public Policy at the National University of Singapore. He was thereafter appointed an adjunct associate professor at the NUS Business School and an honorary professor at Shohbit University in Uttar Pradesh, India. In 2022, he received an honorary Doctor of the University degree from the University of Strathclyde. He is a fellow of the Singapore University of Social Sciences and the Global Federation of Competitiveness Councils.

== Business career ==
After leaving school, Sim worked as a construction site supervisor and salesperson at Diethelm (now DKSH) before starting a business at 24. In 1982, he started Besco Building Supplies, which manufactured building materials. By his early 40s, he had expanded his business portfolio to 15 companies, including a toilet cubicle manufacturer and a $115-million tiling factory. He was also involved in real estate investments, at one point owning 15 properties, and was a developer of the Australian International School Singapore. In the late 1990s, Sim watched a speech by then-Prime Minister Goh Chok Tong on the social significance of clean public toilets. By the end of the 1997 Asian financial crisis, he sold off a portion of his businesses and began to volunteer with the Samaritans of Singapore.

== World Toilet Organisation ==
In December 1998, he founded the Restroom Association of Singapore, later launching a rating system for the cleanliness of public toilets in collaboration with the National Environmental Agency.

On 19 November 2001, he founded the World Toilet Organization as an advocacy group for global sanitation. In his role as director of the WTO, Sim is a lobbyist and coordinator for sanitation efforts, organising an annual World Toilet Summit, and contributing to administrative and policy changes in Brazil, China, India, and Singapore. Sim also lobbied Singapore's Ministry of Foreign Affairs (MFA) to support establishing 19 November as World Toilet Day, which led to Singapore's first-ever tabled resolution at the United Nations in 2012, which succeeded with 120 co-sponsors.

Sim raises funds for WTO through hosting the World Toilet Summits and philanthropic grants, including from the Lien Foundation and Gates Foundation. He uses emotional branding, humour, and celebrity endorsements to raise awareness of sanitation issues. Under Sim's leadership, the WTO launched a series of World Toilet Colleges, which ran the world's first toilet-cleaning qualification programme, and which currently provides sanitation training for people in the developing world. He provided humanitarian aid for Turkey after the 2023 Turkey–Syria earthquakes.

In 2008, he was appointed to the World Economic Forum's Global Agenda Council for Water Security and the GAC for Social Entrepreneurship. He was appointed co-convenor of India’s Swachh Andhra Pradesh Initiative in 2015.

For his work, Sim is also known as "Mr Toilet". The eponymous documentary Mr. Toilet about Sim's activism premiered at North America's largest documentary festival, Hot Docs Canadian International Documentary Festival on 27 April 2019. Sim also worked with Singaporean director Jack Neo in developing the 2013 film Everybody's Business.

== Other social ventures ==
In the early 2010s, Sim ventured into social entrepreneurship as a means to diversify revenue for WTO. Sim founded BOP Hub, a non-profit organisation targeting bottom-of-pyramid individuals at the poorest global income margins in 2011, developing a $10,000,000 building in Ubi. In 2016, the organisation engaged in food relief efforts for migrant workers in Singapore, and currently acts as a startup accelerator for social enterprises.

He was also involved in bringing Dialogue in the Dark, a global disability social business, to Singapore.

== Personal life ==
He lives in Meyer Road, Katong, Singapore. His first marriage in 1989 ended in divorce after a year. He remarried in 1990 and has two sons and two daughters with his current wife. He identifies as having "no religion".

== Awards ==
- SkillsFuture Fellow (2022)
- NUS Alumni Award (2021)
- Tatler Asia's Most Influential (2020)
- Commonwealth Points of Light Award (2018)
- Luxembourg Peace Prize for Outstanding Peace Activist (2018)
- President's Award for Volunteerism and Philanthropy (2016)
- Synergos Senior Fellow (2012)
- Reader's Digest Asian of the Year (2011)
- Channel News Asia Asian of the Year (2009)
- Time Hero of the Environment (2008)
- Asian Development Bank Water Champion (2008)
- Ashoka Fellow (2007)
- Schwab Foundation Social Entrepreneur of the Year (2006)
- Ministry of Environment Singapore Green Plan 2012 Award (2004)

== Bibliography ==
- Sim, Jack (August 2024). The Gumption of Mr. Toilet. Penguin Books. ISBN 9789815144802.
- Sim, Jack; Cookey, Peter (2022). "Sanitation advocacy services". Integrated Functional Sanitation Value Chain: The Role of the Sanitation Economy. IWA Publishing. ISBN 9781789061833.
- Sim, Jack (2020). "Chapter". Fifty Secrets of Singapore's Success. Singapore: The Straits Times. ISBN 9789814827751.
- Sim, Jack (2016). "Elegant toilet culture to boost tourism". www.chinadaily.com.cn.
- Sim, Jack (9 December 2017). "Chinese and Indian toilet revolutions look to Singapore's bottom line". South China Morning Post.
- Sim, Jack (18 September 2014). "The world toilet crisis can be solved". The Economist.
- Sim, Jack (2012). "Bottoms Up". Social Space. Singapore Management University. pp. 110–114.
- Dayson, Karl; Sim, Jack (2010). "Technology to Toilets: Can Microfinance and IT Help Solve the World's Sanitation Crisis?" (PDF). Journal of Electronic Commerce in Organizations. 8 (3): 49–59. doi:10.4018/jeco.2010070105.
- Sim, Jack (2008). "Sleepless in Singapore". Social Space. Singapore Management University. pp. 102–104.
