= Haewoojae =

Toilet museum in Suwon, South Korea

- 해우재
- Established: September 30, 2010
- Coordinates: 37.3191°N 126.9779°E
- Type: Toilet museum
- Owner: Government of Suwon
- Website: www.haewoojae.com/eng/

Haewoojae (Korean: 해우재; Hanja: 解憂齋; lit. 'house of relieving anxiety'), also known as Mr. Toilet House, is a museum and cultural center dedicated to toilets located in Suwon, South Korea. It was built in 2007 as the residence of former mayor of Suwon Shim Jae-Deok. Shim was known for his campaigning to improve the quality of toilets in Suwon. After his death in 2009, the building reopened in 2010 as a cultural center and museum related to toilets. Haewoojae displays historical and modern toilets as well as exhibitions on toilets' role in culture, as well as ways to improve existing toilet systems.

== History ==
Construction on Haewoojae began in May 2007 in preparation of the inaugural meeting of the World Toilet Association. On November 11 the same year, the construction was completed. The building was initially used as a residence for Shim Jae-Deok, the former mayor of Suwon who worked to improve the quality of toilets in Suwon. The World Toilet Association stated that they were building Haewoojae ahead of the United Nations' declaration of 2008 as the international year of hygiene. During that time, the house was open to the public for rent for $50,000 US dollars a night.

Shim died on January 14, 2009; his funeral was held at Haewoojae. In July 2009, his family donated Haewoojae to Suwon's government, which announced plans to renovate it and convert into a toilet-themed park for residents. On August 5, 2010, it was announced that Haewoojae's remodeling would be finished around late September the same year. On September 30, 2010, Haewoojae was reopened to the public, this time as a toilet-related cultural exhibition facility. Haewoojae would later on also open a toilet themed outdoors park outside of it in July 4, 2012.

== Museum layout ==
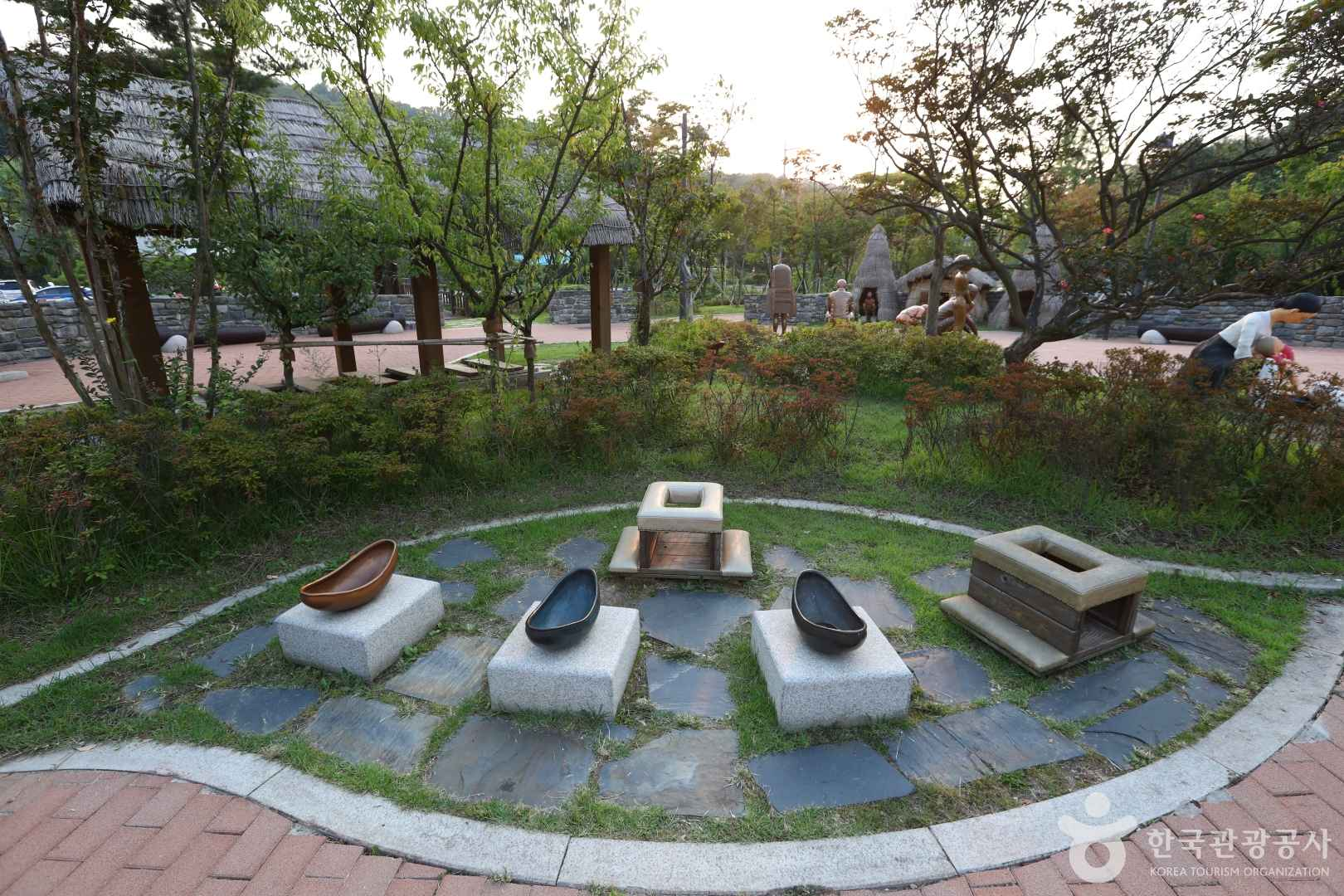

There are four bathrooms, two above ground floors and a basement at Haewoojae. The combined area of the two floors is 420 square meters. Furthermore, there are specialized mirrors on the first floor bathroom of Haewoojae which can turn opaque on the first floor, and translucent bathroom walls on the second floor, and the toilets all have a speaker which plays music. The toilets in Haewoojae all employ water-saving systems which reduce water usage by around 70% compared to commercial toilets.

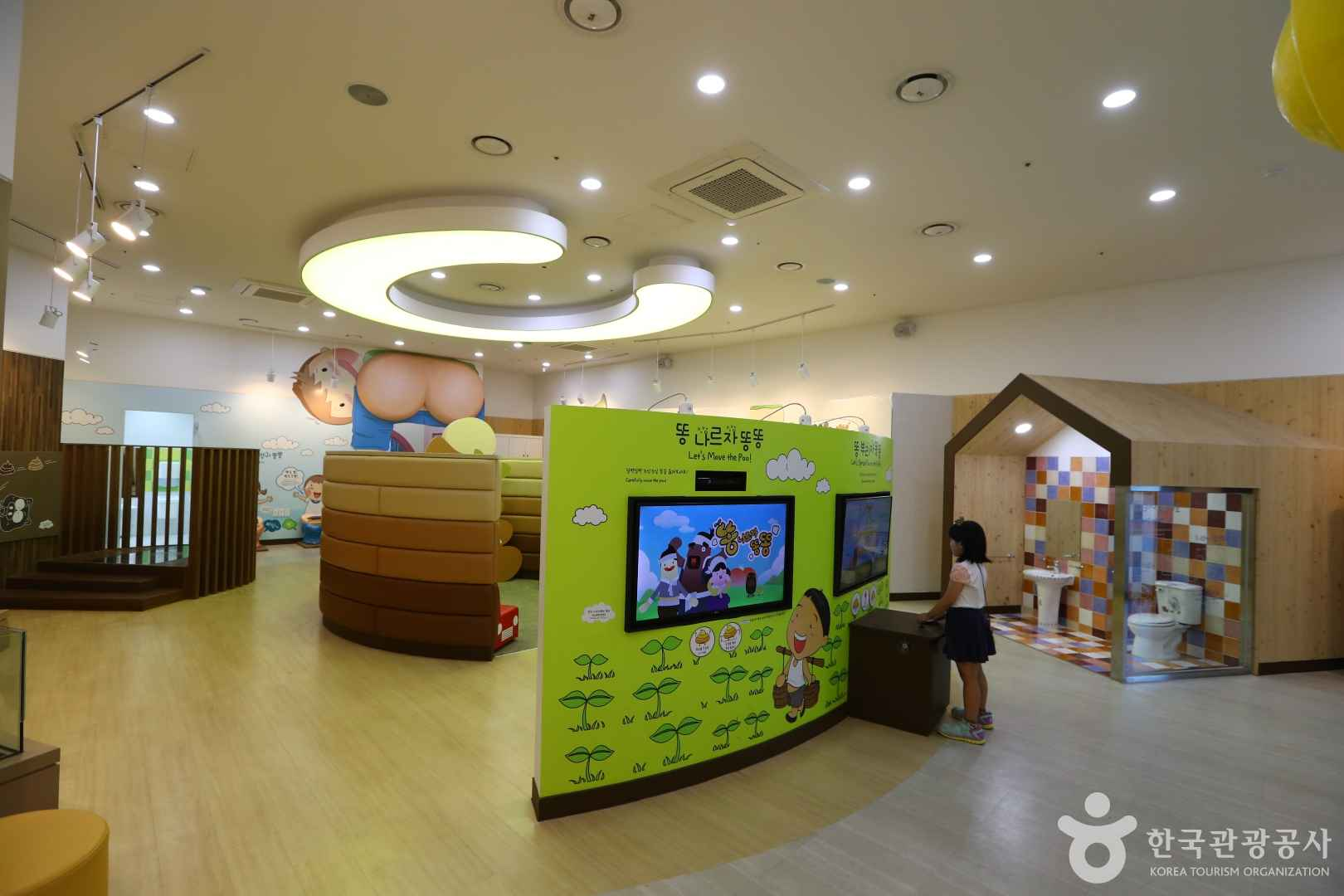

On the first floor of the museum, toilets and toilet-related objects starting from the 1950s to the present are exhibited, while the second floor contains information about how toilets play a role in culture as well as how to improve toilet systems. Furthermore, the museum contains toilets from historical eras of South Korea, particularly the Baekje and Silla eras. There are also depictions of people defecating and urinating throughout the museum. Surrounding the museum, there is an outdoors park containing historical examples of outhouses and pig toilets, as well as sculptures of people defecating.

== See also ==
- Sulabh International Museum of Toilets
- Toilet History Museum
