= Toilet History Museum =

- київського Музею історії туалету
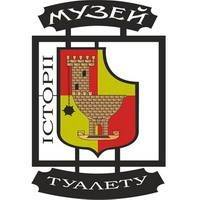
- Official logo of the Toilet History Museum

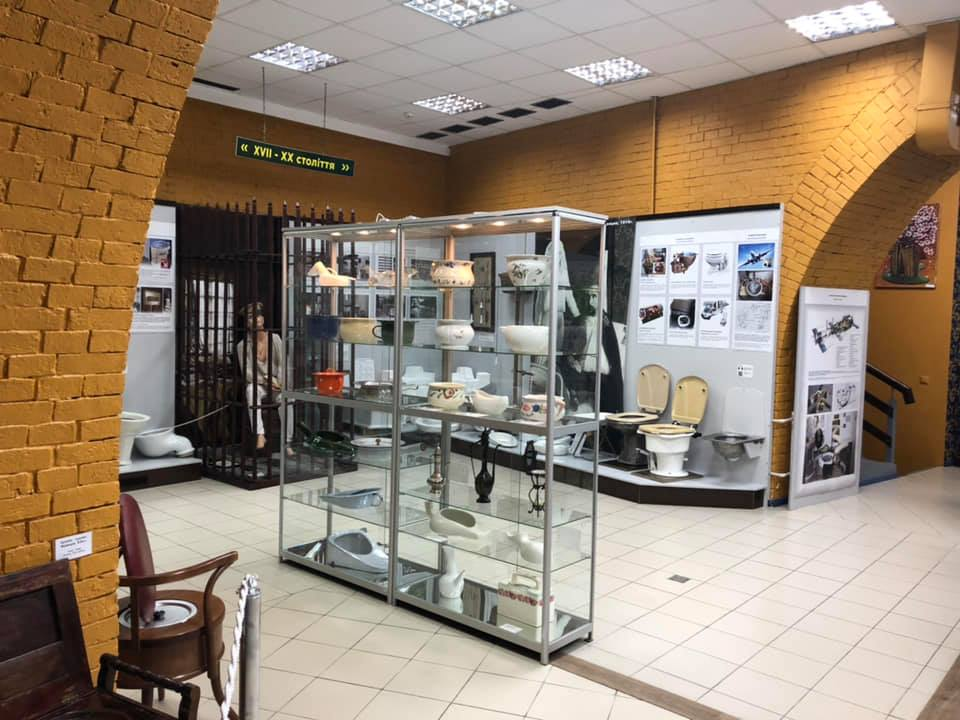
- Some of the museum's collection, 2019
- Established: 2006
- Location: Rybalska str. 22 Tower №5 Kyiv, Ukraine
- Coordinates: 50°26′10″N 30°32′12″E
- Type: History museum
- Owners: Nikolay and Marina Bogdanenko
- Website: museumtoilet.com.ua

The Toilet History Museum is a private museum in Kyiv, Ukraine, that contains the largest collection of toilet-related souvenirs and items in the world, including historic chamber pots, squatting pans, and urinals. The museum was founded in 2006 by a Ukrainian couple who worked in the plumbing business and is currently housed in a building within the Kyiv Fortress. In 2016, the Guinness World Records recognized it as "the largest collection of souvenir toilet bowls in the world".

== Background ==
The museum was created by Nikolay and Marina Bogdanenko, a Ukrainian couple who had previously worked in the plumbing supply business and wanted to teach people about the enduring importance of hygiene. It opened in 2006 with items that the Bogdanenkos had collected from around the world, many while on vacation. In 2013 Bogdanenko published a 521-page book on the history of hygiene and toiletry, World History (of Toilets). Today, the museum draws an estimated 1,000 visitors per month and is housed in the Kyiv Fortress, a building which dates to the 19th century.

== Organization ==
The museum covers the toilet from prehistoric times to the present day and related topics, including the dressing room and clothes worn to clean toilets. Exhibits are arranged sequentially, dividing history into primitive society, antiquity, the Middle Ages, Renaissance, 17th–20th century, modernity, and art water closets. The museum has replicas of some of the first toilet seats and explains the invention of toilet paper more than 2,000 years ago in China. A display shows visitors waste disposal methods from medieval castles and why medieval toilets were called wardrobes. The flushing toilet, first sketched by Leonardo da Vinci, is brought to life in a wood model. A separate room contains a movie theater that shows videos about toilets in alternating languages. There are more than 580 items in the permanent collection, which earned it recognition in the Guinness World Records in 2016.

== See also ==
- Haewoojae
- Sulabh International Museum of Toilets
