= World Toilet Organization =

Global non-profit organization

- Formation: 2001
- Founder: Jack Sim
- Type: Non-profit organization
- Registration no.: 200205358C
- Purpose: Improving toilet and sanitation conditions
- Headquarters: Singapore
- Region served: Worldwide
- Method: Advocacy, capacity building, training, building market infrastructure, knowledge management, networking
- Website: www.worldtoilet.org ; www.worldtoiletday.org

The World Toilet Organization (WTO) is a global non-profit organization whose goal is to improve toilet and sanitation conditions worldwide. It was founded in 2001 with 15 members and has now grown to 151 member organizations in 53 countries. The WTO is also the organizer of the World Toilet Summit, the Urgent Run and initiated the United Nations World Toilet Day.

== History ==
The World Toilet Organisation was founded by Jack Sim in Singapore on 19 November 2001.

== Initiatives ==
=== World Toilet Day ===
World Toilet Day (WTD) was founded on 19 November 2001, and the inaugural World Toilet Summit (WTS) was held on the same day. Created by the WTO, World Toilet Day's supreme purpose is to draw attention to the ongoing global sanitation crisis. NGOs, the private sector, civil society organizations and the international community joined in to mark the global day. The United Nations also officially recognizes this day due to the need to raise awareness about the world's sanitation crisis.

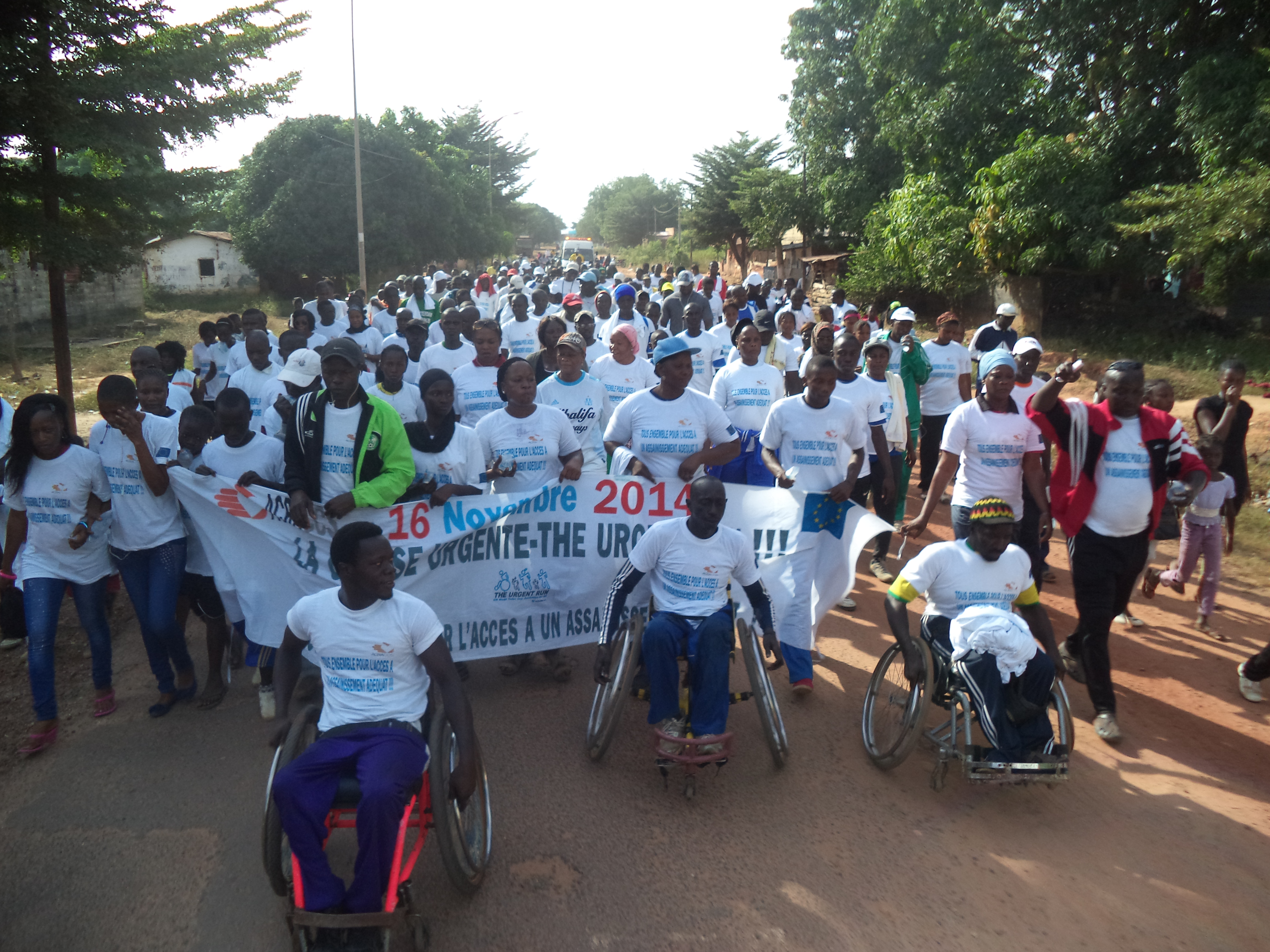
The Urgent Run in Senegal organized to celebrate WTD 2014

==== Urgent Run ====
The WTO commemorates WTD annually with the Urgent Run. The Urgent Run is a call for urgent action to end the sanitation crisis and aims to bring communities around the world together to raise awareness for the global sanitation challenge and engage people with sanitation issues in their local communities. For the past few years, in the lead-up to United Nations World Toilet Day, communities worldwide have come together to organize sanitation-themed Urgent Runs in varying formats and include fun runs, educational events, toilet cleaning programs, awareness walks, carnivals and even motorbike parades. They are organized by community groups, companies, universities, volunteers and NGOs to engage their local communities on their sanitation challenges.

=== Projects supported ===
==== Rainbow School Toilet Initiative ====
WTO's Rainbow School Toilet Initiative was launched in 2015. In 2016 four rural schools, with an estimated 1,300 students (average 300 students per school) benefited from the new toilet buildings equipped with a recyclable wastewater treatment plant.

==== Floating Community Toilet Project ====
Until 2018, no proper sanitation existed for the almost 100,000 people living in floating communities on Cambodia's Tonlé Sap Lake. To address sanitation issues in these floating communities, Wetlands Work! (WW) developed the HandyPod, a product that contains the raw sewage and treats it by harnessing various biological processes. This project aims to eliminate open defecation by providing sanitation systems to floating schools and teaching students to use toilets; improve sanitation and hygiene; reduce school absences due to diarrhea; increase school attendance, especially for girls, as well as drive demand for household toilets.

The WTO and WW raised funds for the project through various platforms and in 2016 a total of eight HandyPods have been installed, befitting approximately 900 students and 650 indirect beneficiaries in their households.

=== World Toilet College ===
The World Toilet College (WTC) started as a social enterprise in 2005 with the belief that there is a need for an independent world body to ensure best practices and standards in toilet design, cleanliness and sanitation technologies. While the lack of toilets is an endemic problem, poor management and hygienic maintenance are equally serious issues. A well-kept toilet will encourage proper usage and prevent deadly diseases.

Since 2005, WTC has trained more than 5,000 people across its various courses and conducted programs and courses.

== Logo ==
The logo of the World Toilet Organization consists of a heart-shaped toilet seat which moves slightly up and down.

== See also ==
- WASH (Water, Sanitation, Hygiene)
- Bindeshwar Pathak another pioneer of proper toilets in India founder of Sulabh International
