= Bindeshwar Pathak =

Indian sociologist (1943–2023)

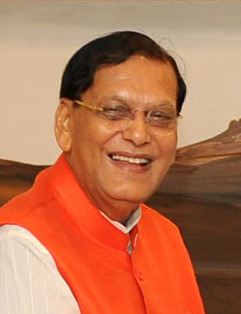
- Pathak in 2016
- Born: 2 April 1943; Hajipur, Bihar Province, British India
- Died: 15 August 2023 (aged 80); New Delhi, India
- Education: M.A. (Sociology 1980), M.A. (English 1986), Ph.D. (1985), D.Litt. (1994)
- Alma mater: Banaras Hindu University, Patna University
- Known for: Founding Sulabh International and social reform in India

Bindeshwar Pathak (2 April 1943 – 15 August 2023) was an Indian sociologist and social entrepreneur. He was the founder of Sulabh International, an India-based social service organisation promoting human rights, environmental sanitation, non-conventional sources of energy, waste management and social reforms through education. He was the Brand Ambassador for Swachh Rail Mission of Indian Railways, a complement to the broader Swachh Bharat Mission. His work is considered pioneering in social reform, especially in the field of sanitation and hygiene. He received various national and international awards for his work with this organisation. He was presented with the Lal Bahadur Shastri National Award for Excellence in Public Administration, Academics and Management for the year 2017. He was conferred the Padma Vibhushan, India's second-highest civilian award, posthumously in 2024 and the Padma Bhushan, India's third-highest civilian award, in 1991.

== His education ==
Bindeshwar Pathak was born in Hajipur, Bihar, on 2 April 1943. He graduated in Sociology in 1964 from the Banaras Hindu University. He earned his master's degree in 1980 and his PhD in 1985, from the University of Patna. A prolific writer and speaker, Dr. Pathak authored several books, the best known of which is The Road to Freedom, and was a frequent participant in conferences on sanitation, health and social progress around the world.

== Movement for sanitation and hygiene ==
Pathak first came to understand the plight of manual scavengers (Note: "A person engaged or employed... for manually cleaning, carrying, disposing of, or otherwise handling in any manner, human excreta in an insanitary latrine or in an open drain or pit into which the human excreta from the insanitary latrines is disposed of." Prohibition of Employment as Manual Scavengers and their Rehabilitation Act, 2013, section 2(g).) in 1968 when he joined the Bhangi-Mukti (scavengers' liberation) Cell of the Bihar Gandhi Centenary Celebrations Committee. During that time, he travelled throughout India, living with scavenger families as part of his Ph.D. research. Drawing on that experience, he resolved to take action, not only out of sympathy for the scavengers but also in the belief that scavenging is a dehumanising practice that would ultimately have a destructive impact on modern Indian society.

Pathak established the Sulabh International Social Service Organization in 1970, combining technical innovation with humanitarian principles. The organisation works to promote human rights, environmental sanitation, non-conventional sources of energy, waste management and social reforms through education. The organisation counts 50,000 volunteers. He has made innovative use of biogas creation by linking Sulabh toilets to fermentation plants, he had designed over three decades ago and which are now becoming a byword for sanitation in developing countries all over the world. One of the distinctive features of Pathak's project lies in the fact that besides producing odour-free bio-gas, it also releases clean water rich in phosphorus and other ingredients which are important constituents of organic manure. His sanitation movement ensures cleanliness and prevents greenhouse gas emission.

== Awards ==
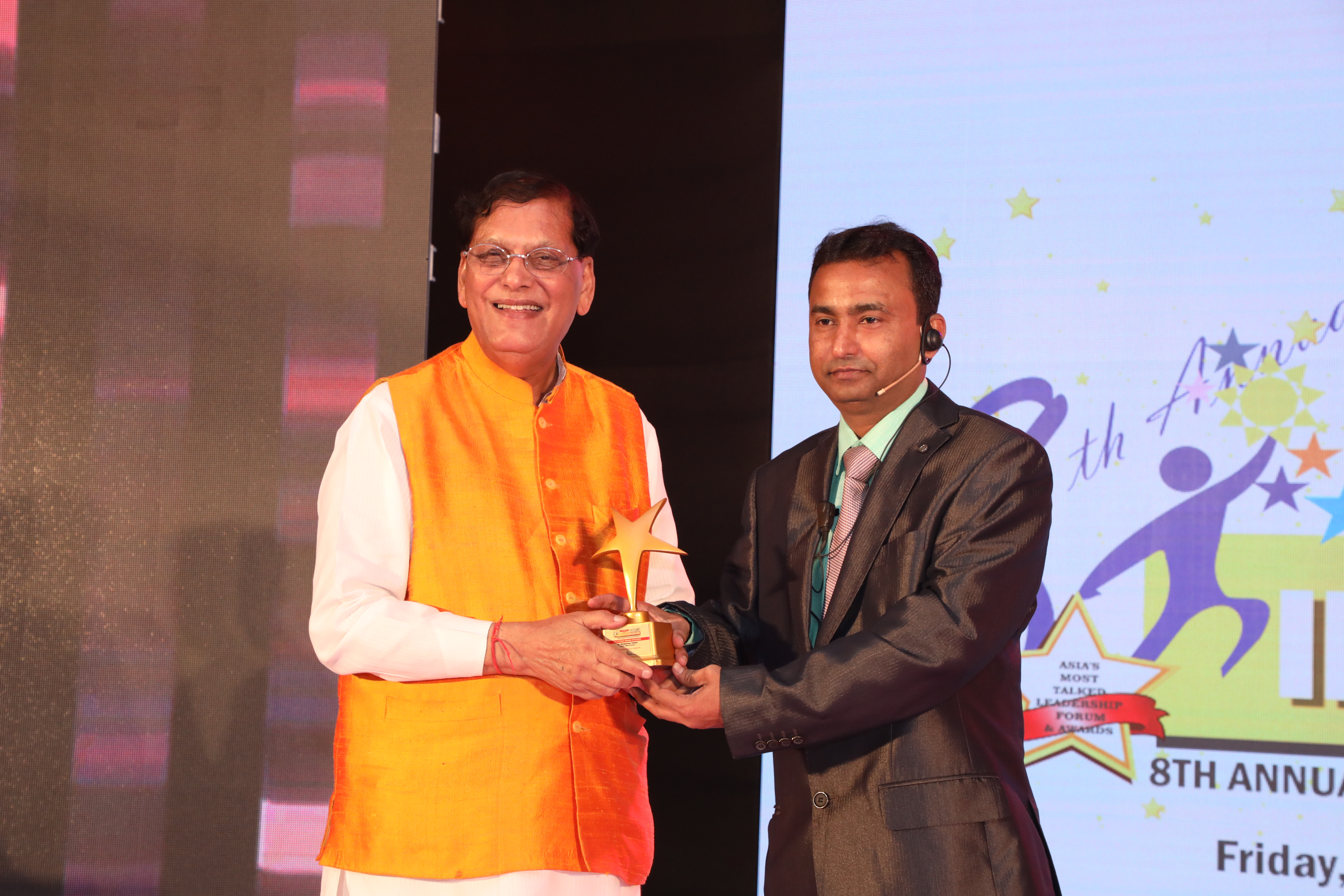
Bindeshwar Pathak receiving the Indian Affairs Social Reformer of the Year 2017 award from Satya Brahma, founder of India Leadership Conclave

Bindeshwar Pathak was a Padma Bhushan recipient from the Government of India. In 2003, his name was added to the Global 500 Roll of Honour. Bindheshwar Pathak also received the Energy Globe Award, and the Dubai International Award for Best Practices. He was awarded the Stockholm Water Prize in 2009. In June 2013, he also received the Legend of Planet award from the French senate in Paris, ahead of World Environment Day. Antarrashtriya Bhojpuri Samman was awarded to him in the 4th world Bhojpuri Sammelan in Port Louis.

In January 2011, Pathak was invited to deliver a lecture at The Cambridge Union, a debating society of the University of Cambridge in England. The lecture was well received by the students where Dr Pathak urged the students to join voluntary work in the field of sanitation.

In 2014, he was honoured by Sardar Patel International Award for "Excellence in the field of Social Development".

In April 2016, Bill de Blasio, Mayor of New York City, declared 14 April 2016 as Bindeshwar Pathak Day.

On 12 July 2017, Pathak's book The Making of a Legend, on the life of Prime Minister Narendra Modi, was launched in New Delhi.

In 2020, Namaste, Bindeshwar Pathak!, an inspiring book detailing his work as a social innovator, was published.

In 2021 the sociologist Y. Ravindranath Rao published a biography Bindeshwar Pathak : A Social Reformer with the publisher Rupa publications. In 2023 Mr. Pathak received Bihar Vishwa Gaurav Samman in NYC from Bihar Foundation USA East Coast Chapter. Pathak was named Indian Affairs Social Reformer of the Year, 2017, at the 8th Annual India Leadership Conclave. In June 2018 he was honoured with the Nikkei Asia prize for culture and community by Nikkei inc in Tokyo, Japan.

== Death ==
Bindeshwar Pathak died in New Delhi on 15 August 2023, at the age of 80. His death was reported as due to a cardiac arrest.
