= UNESCO World Water Assessment Programme =

UNESCO WWAP
- UNESCO World Water Assessment Programme
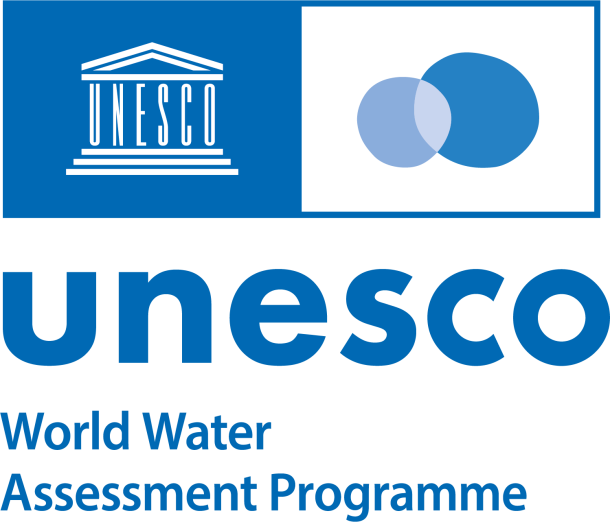
- Logo
- Formation: 2000
- Legal status: Active
- Headquarters: Perugia, Italy
- Official language: English, Italian
- Website: https://www.unesco.org/wwap

The UNESCO World Water Assessment Programme (WWAP) was established in 2000 in response to a call from the UN Commission on Sustainable Development (CSD) to produce a UN system-wide periodic global overview of the status in terms of quantity and quality, use and management of freshwater resources.

WWAP actively coordinates the sustained efforts of a broad coalition of UN-Water members and various international partners. This collaboration is central to producing the World Water Development Report (WWDR), the UN-Water's flagship report on water and sanitation issues. Released annually, the WWDR focuses on different strategic water issues each year, providing a comprehensive review of the global state of freshwater resources.

WWAP also developed a comprehensive gender component with concrete achievements, namely, the development of Toolkit on Sex-disaggregated Water Data and the Call for Action Initiative supported by a Multi-Stakeholder Coalition composed of Member State institutions, UN agencies, international and regional organizations, Official Development Assistance (ODA) agencies, and civil society.

== Background ==
In 1998, during the Sixth Session of the Commission on Sustainable Development (CSD), the need for regular, global assessments of freshwater resources was highlighted. In response to this call, what is now known as UN-Water (then the ACC Subcommittee on Water Resources) took the decision to produce a UN system-wide periodic global overview of the status, use and management of freshwater resources. Recognizing the importance for the report to have a multi-stakeholder dimension, it was decided that it would be a United Nations report in cooperation with other stakeholders. The World Water Assessment Programme was established in 2000 to coordinate the production of the Report. The first WWDR was launched on 22 March 2003.

Until 2012, the WWDR was produced and released every three years. In 2012, as a result of a Global Stakeholder Survey in which stakeholders called for change in terms of focus and periodicity, UN-Water Members decided to change the WWDR into an annual production with a thematic focus on specific strategic water issues.

The World Water Assessment Programme (WWAP) is an extra-budgetary programme supported by the Italian government, and hosted by the Umbria region in Perugia, Italy, since 2007. Between 2000 and 2006, WWAP was funded by the Japanese government and was based at UNESCO headquarters in Paris.

WWAP, initially through the WWDR series, underlined the importance of gender equality in water domain for Sustainable Development. To add more substance and depth to the gender related discussion, UNESCO WWAP led a special working group that highlighted the substantial and persistent gender inequalities in water access, management, and governance. These inequalities are significant barriers to achieving the Sustainable Development Goals (SDGs). In line with the alarming findings of this working group and aligned with UNESCO's Gender Equality Priority, WWAP developed its full-fledged programme on gender.

== Mission and Objectives ==
UNESCO WWAP provides knowledge, technical support and publications related to global water governance to help formulate and implement sustainable water policies.

== Activities ==
=== United Nations World Water Development Report (UN WWDR) ===
The WWDR is an annual thematic report that assesses global freshwater resources and water management challenges. It is launched each year the 22 March on the UN World Water Day. Since 2014, the World Water Development Report (WWDR) has been an annual, thematic publication, focusing each year on a different strategic issue, such as groundwater, climate change, or water governance. Prior to 2014, the reports were produced every three years and took a comprehensive approach.

WWAP coordinates with all UN agencies and international academic institutions to prepare the report, which each year focuses on a different aspect of water resources. The report provides policy recommendations to decision-makers by offering the most updated knowledge available, in-depth analyses, and best practices.

The report is widely used as a reference in global water policy research and SDG 6 monitoring frameworks. Independent evaluations highlight that the WWDR contributes to data harmonization in global water governance, although it is often complemented by World Bank and OECD datasets.

- 2026: Water for All People: Equal Rights and Opportunities
- 2025: Mountains and glaciers: water towers
- 2024: Water for Prosperity and Peace
- 2023: Partnerships and Cooperation for Water
- 2022: Groundwater: Making the invisible visible
- 2021: Valuing Water
- 2020: Water and Climate Change
- 2019: Leaving No One Behind
- 2018: Nature-Based Solutions for Water
- 2017: Wastewater: The Untapped Resource
- 2016: Water and Jobs
- 2015: Water for a Sustainable World
- 2014: Water and Energy
- 2012: Managing Water under Uncertainty and Risk
- 2009: Water in a Changing World
- 2006: Water: A Shared Responsibility
- 2003: Water for People, Water for Life

The role of WWAP and WWDR has been analyzed in academic literature as part of broader global environmental governance systems. Studies emphasize its function in aggregating fragmented water data across countries and institutions.

Research from water policy institutions such as the Stockholm International Water Institute (SIWI) notes that global water reports like the WWDR help shape international discourse on water security and sustainability.

==== Water and Climate Change training program ====
WWAP in collaboration with UNESCO Cairo Office conducted regional training on ‘Water and Climate Change'. The online training that took place in March 2021 was attended by the participants from 17 States from the Arab Region (Lebanon, Libya, Saudi Arabia, Jordan, Algeria, Morocco, Kuwait, Oman, UAE Yemen, Qatar, Palestine, Egypt, Tunisia, Sudan, Iraq, and Syria).

==== Wastewater training program ====
WWAP, in collaboration with UNESCO Cairo Office, organized in-person training in Cairo, Egypt to share innovative and successful approaches on improved wastewater management which generates social, environmental and economic benefits essential for sustainable development and to achieve the 2030 Agenda for Sustainable Development.

A second training took place in Accra, Ghana that focused on Effective Management of Water Quality and Emerging Pollutants in Water and Wastewater in Sub-Saharan Africa, and was organized in collaboration with the International Initiative on Water Quality (IIWQ) and the Regional Centre for Integrated River basin Management (RC-IRBM).

==== Call for Action ====
WWAP coordinates a Call for Action together with a Multi-stakeholder Coalition composed by Member States' institutions, UN agencies, international and regional organizations, NGOs, private sector and civil society. The Call for Action, launched in 2021, aims to catalyze concrete action through advocacy, policy, gender-equal funding, and the development of innovative methods, approaches and tools.

The Call for Action Initiative was presented at major events, among others: African Water Forum (November 2021), Asian World Water Week (February 2022), Dushanbe Water Action Decade Conference (June 2022), High-Level Political Forum (July 2022), World Water Week (August 2022, 2023, 2024), Korea International Water Week (November 2022), UN 2023 Water Conference in New York (March 2023), where the Call for Action and the voluntary commitments by its Multi-Stakeholder Coalition were listed as official commitment under the Water Action Agenda; World Water Forum in Bali (May 2024).

The Dushanbe Declaration of June 2022, issued at the second Water Action Decade Conference, called for the closure of gender data gaps. It emphasized the need for enhanced provision and accessibility of gender-disaggregated data, which is crucial for informed decision-making and promoting gender equality in the water sector. This Declaration also noted favorably Call for Action to accelerate gender equality in water management practices.

==== UNESCO-WWAP Gender Disaggregated Water Data Toolkit ====
UNESCO-WWAP Gender Disaggregated Water Data Toolkit was designed and published in 2015 and the second edition was redesigned in 2019 to incorporate SDG 5, SDG 6 and other Sustainable Development Goals of the 2030 Agenda.

The Toolkit was developed to help collect relevant quantitative and qualitative data on water and gender, useful to inform water policy and planning. to help decision makers adopt data-driven and gender-transformative water policies and make concrete changes to advance gender equality in water and meet the 2030 Agenda for Sustainable Development.

- Tool 1: Gender-responsive indicators for water assessment, monitoring and reporting
- Tool 2: Methodology for the collection of sex-disaggregated water data
- Tool 3: Guidelines on the collection of sex-disaggregated water data
- Tool 4: Questionnaire for the collection of sex-disaggregated water data

==== SDG 6 Synthesis Report ====
In 2015, UN Member States adopted the 2030 Agenda, setting universal and transformative goals and targets. To present the overview of progress in water domain, the ‘SDG 6 Synthesis Report 2018 on Water and Sanitation' was produced by a UN-Water Task Force including 13 UN Agencies coordinated by WWAP. The SDG 6 Synthesis Report 2018 provides an overview of the status of implementation at the global and regional levels, outlining ways to accelerate progress towards this goal, as well as some comprehensive information about how SDG 6 is interlinked to other SDG targets and indicators.

== Criticism and limitations ==
Some policy analyses suggest that global water reporting systems rely heavily on aggregated data and may face limitations in consistency and national-level accuracy.

Additionally, governance research highlights the challenge of balancing global reporting frameworks with locally produced water data systems.

== Publications ==
- The interconnected nature of water, gender and climate: case studies from the Pacific Small Island Developing States (2025)
- Agua, género y clima en América Latina y el Caribe: mejores datos para mejores estrategias de adaptación; estudios de casos (2025)
- Global employment trends and the water dependency of jobs: technical paper (2024)
- The Call for Action explained (2022)
- Taking stock of progress towards gender equality in the water domain: where do we stand 25 years after the Beijing Declaration? (2021)
- Accelerating gender equality in the water domain: a call for action (2021)
- Methodological approach for applying the UNESCO WWAP Water and Gender Indicators: an example from Argentina (2020)
- Migration and its interdependencies with water scarcity, gender and youth employment (2017)

== See also ==
- World Water Forum
- World Water Council
- World Water Week (WWW)
- World Water Day
- UN-Water
- World Water Development Report
- Water security
- Sustainable Development Goals
