= AquaFed =

International advocacy group

AquaFed - The International Federation of Private Water Operators
- Formation: 2005
- Type: Non-profit non-governmental organisation
- Headquarters: Paris, France
- Region served: Worldwide
- Official language: English, French
- President: Frédéric Van Heems
- Website: AquaFed Website

AquaFed is the International Federation of Private Water Operators. It represents more than 400 private operators and partners providing water and sanitation services in more than 40 countries worldwide.

AquaFed advocates for its members, provides them with opportunities to network and build partnerships, and helps them develop their business. Its mission is for governments and donors to understand the expertise of its members and their innovative technology solutions, and to promote public-private partnerships.

AquaFed has 4 principal missions:

- Promote public private partnerships (PPP)

For a private water operators, a public-private partnership (PPP) defines a contractual arrangement between a public agency (federal, state or local) and a private sector entity for a water or wastewater related project or service. AquaFed aims to promote and encourage these partnerships to improve water and wastewater services.

- Create a collaborative water community

AquaFed is a platform for its members and partners to exchange, share, learn and collaborate to improve the water sector all together.

- Contribute to the United Nations' 2030 Agenda for Sustainable Development

The 2030 Agenda for Sustainable Development seeks to end poverty and hunger, guarantee the human rights of all, achieve gender equality and ensure the lasting protection of the planet and its natural resources. AquaFed and its members help to contribute to these goals by working on assuring the access to safe water and sanitation in a sustainable way.

- Guarantee the human right to safe water and sanitation

Drinking safe and clean water and having access to sanitation is a human right. AquaFed and its members' main mission is ensuring the implementation of systems allowing anyone to have access to this right.

== Partners ==
AquaFed is partnered with UN-Water, the World Water Council, Sanitation and Water for All, and the COP29.

== Members ==
- ABCONSINDCON – Brazilian National Association of Water and Wastewater Provider
- ACQUE
- Agbar
- ANDESS Chile – Chilean National Association of Health Services Companies
- Aqualia
- Balibago Waterworks
- Bosaq
- Cambodian Water Supply Association
- Eranove
- Eurawasser
- FP2E – Professional Federation of Water Companies
- IME – Mediterranean Water Institute
- Lydec
- LYSA
- Macao Water
- Metro Pacific Water
- NAWC – American National Association of Water Companies
- Palyja
- REMONDIS
- Sénégalaise des Eaux
- SEEG
- Sodeci
- SUEZ
- Veolia
- Vergnet Hydro – Water and energy supplier for Africa
