= IRCC =

IRCC may refer to:

- Indian River Community College, a two-year community college in Fort Pierce, Florida, U.S.
- Immigration, Refugees and Citizenship Canada, a department of the Canadian federal government
- Iraqi Revolutionary Command Council, the ultimate decision making body in Iraq before the 2003 Invasion of Iraq

== See also ==
- IRC (disambiguation)
