= IRC (organization) =

Nonprofit organization in the Netherlands

- Formation: 1968; 58 years ago
- Founded at: 13 Parkweg, The Hague, the Netherlands
- Type: Non-profit organisation
- Headquarters: Nutshuis, Riviervismarkt 5, 2513 AM Den Haag
- Location: The Hague, the Netherlands
- Fields: Water supply, hygiene and sanitation
- Key people: Patrick Barré Moriarty; Chief Executive Officer; Wambui Gichuri; Chair, Supervisory Board
- Website: www.ircwash.org

IRC is an international think tank that works with governments, NGOs, entrepreneurs and people around the world to find long-term solutions to the global crisis in water, sanitation and hygiene services. Founded in 1968, IRC is a non-profit organisation registered since 1980 as a Foundation under Dutch Law. It has its headquarters in The Hague, the Netherlands with country offices in Burkina Faso, Ethiopia, Ghana, Mali and Uganda. In 2023, IRC had 100 staff members, and recorded an annual revenue of €12.5 million.

== History ==
=== Early years ===
In December 1968, under an agreement of the World Health Organization and the Government of the Netherlands, the WHO International Reference Center on Community Water Supply was established (abbreviated as IRC). IRC was then an annex of the Government Institute of Drinking Water Supply. (Dutch: Rijksinstituut voor Drinkwatervoorziening, R.I.D, merged in RIVM in 1984). Apart from the relation with R.I.D, IRC established an advisory board that consisted of representatives of both national and international water supply sector organisations. In 1970, IRC drafted its first five-year plan with three main objectives: provide knowledge, coordinate research, and stimulate a systematic approach to solve problems in the drinking water supply industry. In 1972 IRC's chemical engineer B.C.J. Zoeteman concluded a three-year research on the practicality of iodine and iodine components' disinfection in small water supplies with a research report, which marked the initiation of IRC's Technical Paper (TP) series. In 1973, IRC held the "Bilthoven Meeting", joined by 31 international collaborating institutions. This meeting set working priorities for IRC such as developing appropriate water hygiene practices for better water supply quality. Consequently, follow-up projects were planned and initiated.

=== Gaining independence ===
In 1980, IRC became an independent foundation under the name International Reference Centre for Community Water Supply and Sanitation. (Abbreviated as IRC). In 1981, the IRC foundation was established through an Act of Dutch Parliament. Hans Van Damme became the Director of IRC, while Pier Santema became Chair of the newly constituted Governing Board. In the meantime, the United Nations launched the International Drinking Water Decade, 1981–90, which led to changes in the scope and strategies of IRC. Due to the UN's initiative, IRC's role in international WASH knowledge dissemination was strengthened. In 1981, IRC published one of its most popular books, Small Communities Water Supplies . Between 1983 and 1985, IRC published two major publications on Slow Sand Filtration. The one published in 1985 was further distributed to the WHO Regional Office for Europe and the WRC Research Centre. IRC introduced a focus on gender issues in water, hygiene and sanitation sectors and published several documents on this topic, led by the 1985 publication Participation of Women in Water Supply and Sanitation: Roles and Realities. From the 1980s onwards, IRC started to provide consulting and advisory services. In 1987, IRC undertook a number of assignments from DGIS, Commission of the European Economic Community, DANIDA, UNDP, World Bank, UNICEF and WHO. In 1988, IRC changed its name from "International Reference Centre for Community Water Supply and Sanitation" to "International Water and Sanitation Centre", the abbreviation "IRC" stayed the same however.

=== Years of change ===
In the foreword of IRC's 1991 annual report it says:

The world is changing rapidly, and the magnitude of these changes continues to grow.

In 1990, at a consultation in New Delhi, IRC presented two hands-on experiences of WASH sector knowledge dissemination. During the 1991 Global Consultation on Safe Water and Sanitation for the 1990s held in New Delhi, "community management" was brought up and soon became one of the guiding principles in IRC's work. In the same year, IRC published its 28th technical paper, an approach to sustainable piped water supplies. By 1993, IRC possessed one of the "most comprehensive collections of low-cost water supply and sanitation literature" within the water sector.

In the 1990s, along with knowledge dissemination, IRC delivered advisory and evaluation services and training courses. In 1994, IRC delivered its training courses in English, French and Spanish at its headquarter in The Netherlands and other locations such as Kenya, Cameroon, Burkina Faso, Colombia and India.

In 1996, after working for IRC for 27 years, Mr. Hans van Damme resigned from his position as director of IRC.

In the same year, the Governing Board commissioned an external evaluation of IRC. The main suggestion that came out of the evaluation was that IRC should make a clear distinction between profitable products and information dissemination. Consequently, IRC defined its scope as "Better Water and Sanitation for a better Future", a new policy framework that was put forward in 1997. Changes in technology also influenced IRC's knowledge dissemination. In 1996, IRC set up an intranet system and a World Wide Web page. The IRC website recorded 42,000 clicks between year 1996 and 1997. An average of 3,500 per month. A new IRC Bulletin was published on the Internet as well.

Stepping into the new millennium, IRC presented itself as a "capacity building" organisation to ensure "sustainable and economical" acquisition of WASH services for the world's poorest regions. After the second external evaluation in 2001, advocacy activities, institutional reforms and people-centred approaches were emphasised in IRC's daily operations. Thematic advocacy programmes witnessed a shift from water supply to policy issues, sanitation and hygiene, participatory methodologies and gender issues. In 2000, IRC supported the launch of the Gender and Water Alliance (GWA) and hosted the GWA Secretariat until 2005. Since the 1990s, IRC had worked with and supported WASH resource centre networks in Burkina Faso, Ghana, Honduras, Nepal and Uganda and documented their contribution to a learning and adaptive sector in 2013.

IRC closed a number of long-term projects in 2002. Reorganisation, again, was put as a top priority. In 2006, IRC cut off the statutory link with the Netherlands government through an Act of Parliament, and became an autonomous foundation.

=== Systems Approach ===
In 2008, the Bill & Melinda Gates Foundation awarded IRC two multi-year, multi-country grants for projects on life-cycle costing (WASHCost) and models for sustainable rural water services (Triple-S). These two projects were instrumental in the development of new IRC's Service Delivery Approach towards the development of water, sanitation and hygiene (WASH) services that last not for years, but forever. Key to this approach is that it must be delivered by strong and competent national and local systems.

In 2011, IRC ranked 4th in Philanthropedia's list of "most effective WASH organisations worldwide", and in 2015, IRC ranked 3rd in this list.

In 2014, IRC changed its name from IRC International Water and Sanitation Centre to IRC with as tagline "Supporting water sanitation and hygiene services for life".

In May 2015, Aguaconsult, IRC, WaterAid, Water For People and Osprey Foundation launched Agenda for Change. This collaborative initiative stems from Everyone Forever from Water For People, the Service Delivery Approach of IRC, the WaterAid District-wide Approach and the aid effectiveness agenda of the Sanitation and Water for All (SWA) partnership.

In 2019 IRC celebrated its 50th anniversary by hosting the All Systems Go! symposium in The Hague from 12–14 March.

In July 2019 IRC Ghana country director Vida Duti received the 2019 OFID Annual Award for Development in recognition of her work in striving for sustainable WASH services in the country.

In August 2021, IRC and Water For People launched an alliance and a shared vision called Destination 2030, which aims to reach 200 million people by 2030.

In 2023, IRC's Supervisory Board endorsed a transformative plan. IRC will become a federation of autonomous national organisations, united by a common vision and brand.

== Organisation ==
IRC is a non-profit organisation registered in The Netherlands since 1980 as "Stichting IRC, International Water and Sanitation Centre". It has an oversight model of governance, consisting of a Supervisory Board and a Chief Executive Officer.

IRC has its headquarters in The Hague, the Netherlands with country offices in Burkina Faso, Ethiopia, Ghana, Mali, Niger and Uganda, and staff representatives in Bangladesh, India and Rwanda. In 2023, IRC had 100 people in its flexible workforce (of which 32 international, 68 in focus countries, 4 hosted, 1 intern and 20 associates - operated from 20 countries) and 30 associates. It was active in 110 projects and programmes in 24 countries, and an annual revenue of €12.5 million.

== Memberships and Partnerships ==
IRC is a steering committee member of Sanitation and Water for All, End Water Poverty and the Rural Water Supply Network (RWSN), a founding member of the Water Integrity Network (WIN), a UN-Water partner, a member of the Millennium Water Alliance, the Sustainable Sanitation Alliance, the Netherlands Water Partnership and Partos.
