= Water for Life Decade =

United Nations designation for 2005–2015

The United Nations General Assembly, in December 2003, proclaimed the years 2005–2015 as the International Decade for Action 'Water for Life'. Its primary goal is to promote efforts to fulfill international commitments made on water and water related issues in the United Nations Millennium Development Goals (MDGs) by 2015. In March 2019, the United Nations General Assembly declared the years 2018-2028 as the Water Action Decade.

In order to help to achieve the internationally agreed water-related goals contained in the United Nations Millennium Declaration, and in Agenda 21 and the Johannesburg Plan of Implementation of the World Summit of Sustainable Development (WSSD) the Decade focuses on water-related issues at all levels and on the implementation of programmes and projects, and the furtherance of cooperation at all levels.

During the first UN Decade on Water from 1981 to 1990, it is estimated that more than a billion people gained access to safe drinking water.

The primary goal of the 'Water for Life' Decade is to promote efforts to fulfill international commitments made on water and water-related issues by 2015.

These commitments include the Millennium Development Goals to reduce by half the proportion of people without access to safe drinking water by 2015 and to stop unsustainable exploitation of water resources. At the World Summit in Johannesburg in 2002, two other goals were adopted: to aim to develop integrated water resource management and water efficiency plans by 2005 and to halve, by 2015, the proportion of people who do not have access to basic sanitation.

World Water Day, 22 March 2005, marked the official commencement of the 'Water for Life' Decade.

== Themes ==
Central water related themes include: food, health, environment, disaster prevention, energy, transboundary water issues, scarcity, culture, sanitation, pollution and agriculture. As women play a central role in water provision and management, a special emphasis will be placed on ensuring the participation and involvement of women in these development efforts.

== Activities ==
At the national level, it is expected that each country will take its own approach to organize activities around the 'Water for Life' Decade. All activities that promote public awareness of issues related to the 'Water for Life' theme are encouraged, including the organization of conferences, seminars, expositions and other such public events.

== Organizers ==
UN-Water is coordinating the International Decade for Action 'Water for Life', 2005–2015. UN-Water is the United Nations system-wide inter-agency gathering of all relevant agencies, departments and programmes involved with water-related issues. UN-Water is the inter-agency mechanism for the implementation of the Johannesburg Plan of Implementation water-related provisions and the Millennium Development Goals concerning freshwater. The terms of reference and modalities of work of UN-Water cover the elements of a detailed inter-agency plan for addressing water as well as sanitation issues, and include mechanisms for interacting with non-United Nations system stakeholders.

The chairmanship of UN-Water rotates and is currently held by the United Nations University (UNU), while the Secretariat for UN-Water is based at the United Nations Department of Economic and Social Affairs (UNDESA). Within UNDESA, the Water, Natural Resources and Small Island Developing States Branch in the Division for Sustainable Development will be responsible for the 'Water for Life' Decade.

Two initiatives have been launched by UN-Water to support the 'Water for Life' Decade:

1. The UN-Water Decade Programme on Capacity Development (UNW-DPC). Hosted by the United Nations University in Bonn, Germany, the UNW-DPC strengthens the coherence and effectiveness of capacity development activities in the framework of the Decade.
2. The United Nations Office to Support the International Decade for Action 'Water for Life' 2005-2015 (UNO-IDfA) / UN-Water Decade Programme on Advocacy and Communication (UNW-DPAC)]. Located in Zaragoza, Spain, and led by the United Nations Department of Economic and Social Affairs (UNDESA), UNO-IDfA/UNW-DPAC facilitates information, implements communication and raises awareness in the framework of the Decade.
