= International Fund for Agricultural Development =

Financial institution and UN specialized agency

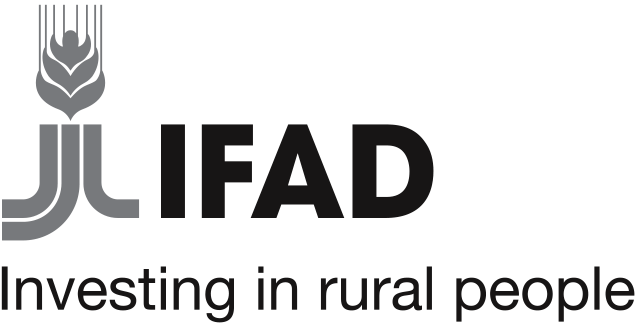

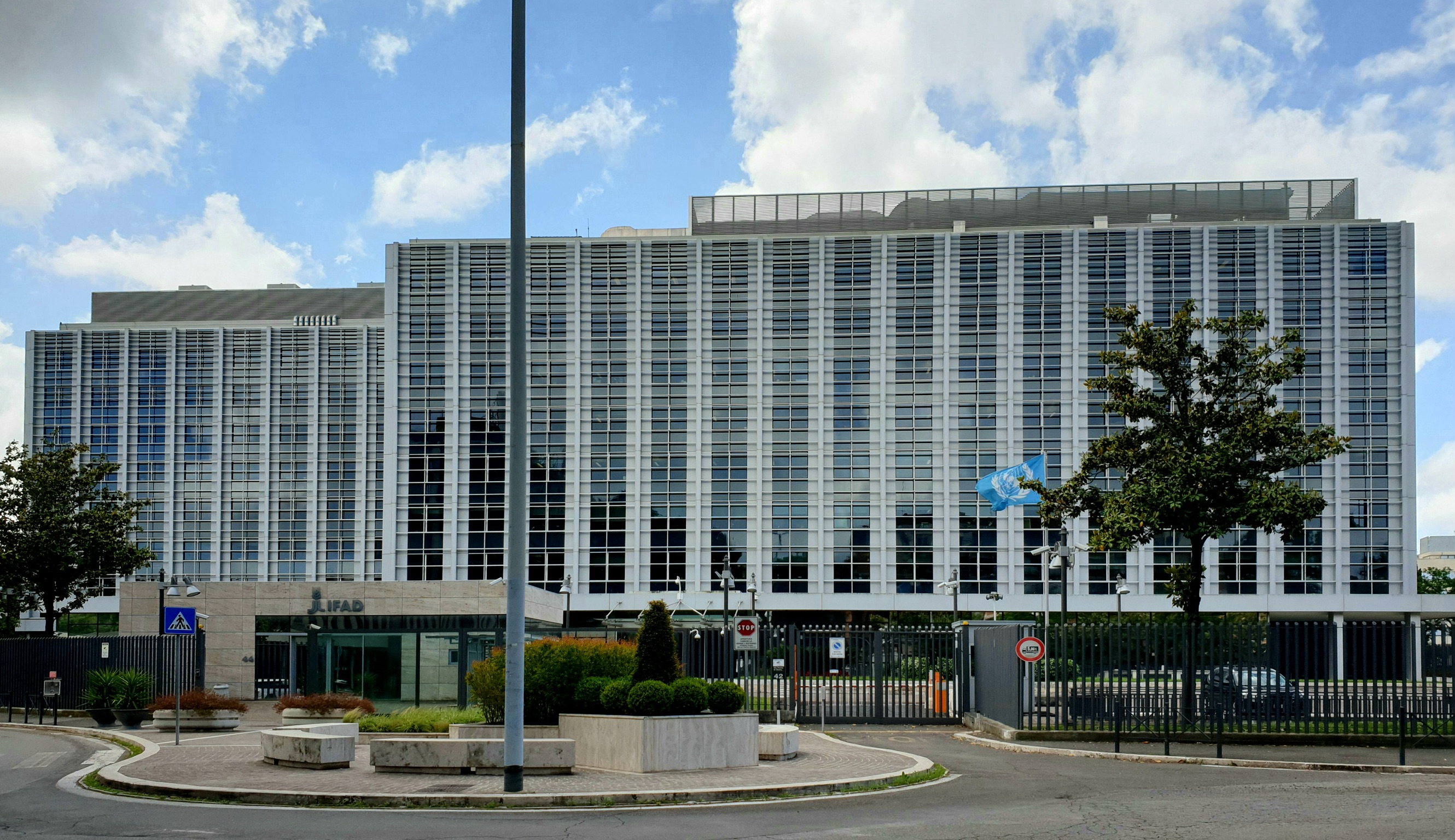
- Abbreviation: IFAD
- Formation: 15 December 1977; 48 years ago
- Type: United Nations specialized agency
- Legal status: Active
- Headquarters: Via Paolo di Dono, 44, 00142; Rome, Italy
- Coordinates: 41°49′47″N 12°29′39″E
- Region served: Worldwide
- Official language: English, French, Spanish, Arabic
- President: Álvaro Lario
- Vice-President: Gérardine Mukeshimana
- Parent organization: United Nations
- Website: www.ifad.org

The International Fund for Agricultural Development (IFAD) is an international financial institution and a specialised agency of the United Nations that works to address poverty and hunger in rural areas of developing countries. It is the only multilateral development organization that focuses solely on rural economies and food security.

IFAD is involved in over 200 projects across nearly 100 countries. It funds and sponsors initiatives that improve land and water management, develop rural infrastructure, train and educate farmers in more efficient technologies, build up resilience against climate change, enhancing market accessibility, and more.

IFAD has 180 member states with the Organization of the Petroleum Exporting Countries (OPEC) and members of the Organisation for Economic Co-operation and Development (OECD). As of 2021, since its foundation, IFAD has provided US$23.2 billion in loans and grants and coordinated an addition US$31 billion in international and domestic co-financing.

== History ==
In the early 1970s, global food shortages led to widespread famine, malnutrition, and mortality, particularly affecting the Sahel region of Africa. The world required long-term, coordinated approaches to the structural issues that were causing destitution and food shortages. IFAD was established as an international financial institution in 1977 through United Nations General Assembly Resolution 32/107 (15 December 1977) as one of the major outcomes of the 1974 World Food Conference. The conference highlighted the vital importance of addressing food insecurity and poverty in emerging countries' rural communities. IFAD officially opened its headquarters in Rome, Italy and convened its first governing council with 120 member states and it is a member of the United Nations Development Group.

== Vision ==
The International Fund for Agricultural Development (IFAD) envisions rural communities that are inclusive, prosperous, and resilient, free from poverty and hunger. Acknowledging that agriculture is the primary livelihood for millions of rural people, IFAD addresses the challenges these communities face, such as climate adaptation, economic instability, and food insecurity.

Through strategic partnerships and financing, IFAD supports initiatives that enable rural populations to enhance productivity, access resources, and build resilience. Its vision includes fostering innovation and advancing policies that promote equity, with a focus on empowering often-overlooked groups, such as women, Indigenous Peoples, and youth.

== Criticism and debates ==
IFAD, alongside other United Nations Specialized Agencies and international aid agencies, has been subject to a wide array of criticism from different actors.

=== Approach to food insecurity and poverty alleviation ===
IFAD is often perceived as aligned with dominant economic ideologies and has faced critiques for falling short in reducing food insecurity and hunger by failing to address the structural challenges of the world economy. The legacy of neo-liberal policies pushed for by international development agencies has often drawn criticism, and although IFAD specifically targets small-scale actors, prevalent debates about agriculture and aid effectiveness extend to the role played by institutions such as IFAD. Many scholars oppose the status quo and call for a change in the approach to food insecurity as illustrated with the quote “The global food system, driven by neoliberal economic policies, has transformed agriculture into an instrument for economic development, often at the expense of local communities' food security and autonomy”.

=== Financialization of agriculture ===
The financialization of agriculture refers to the rising involvement of finance in agriculture, which can take the form of access to credit markets, commodification and trade of agricultural products, evolving regulations (to allow new financial agreements between actors), and more. IFAD has targeted financialization to support food production and enable markets to deliver solutions. As such, some scholars have been vocal in their criticism of financialization and its shortcomings, exacerbating inequalities (concentrating wealth among financial elites and agribusiness corporations), heightening the fragility of the food system to shocks (economic and environmental), stifling collective action to build ecologically sound food systems, and leaving small-scale farmers more exposed to price volatility due to contracted loans and financial derivatives. Moreover, many have pointed to the commodification and trade of agricultural assets as a reason for rising food prices around the world.

=== Technocracy ===
IFAD has sometimes been branded by local actors and critiques as Technocratic, offering one-size-fits-all solutions to specific contexts. International development endeavors are often characterized by their multilateral nature, and the omission of local actors and/or conflicting viewpoints may undermine poverty alleviation efforts.

=== Interpretation of mandate and constituent instruments ===
In 2009, a report published by Rutsel Martha (general counsel of legal affairs at IFAD) titled Mandate issues in the activities of the International Fund for Agricultural Development (IFAD) looked at the issues regarding the institutions interpretations of its law's: "Every action of an international organization, including IFAD, expresses or implies some interpretation of the organization’s law, in particular its constituent instrument. In other words, IFAD’s actions, like those of other international organizations, imply a view about the meaning of its law, and are therefore quintessentially interpretative of the legal regulations that govern its existence and operations". In this sense, multiple occasions have revealed that IFAD relies on interpretations and auxiliary instruments to carry out its mission of alleviating food insecurity. For example, it bypassed the original prerogative stating "the Fund can only finance its developing Member States and intergovernmental organizations in which those States participate" to extend financing to NGO's under certain conditions.

In the late 1990s and early 2000s, IFAD again bypassed its original mandate via legal instruments to deliver programs in the West Bank and Gaza Strip, under accords with the Palestinian authority, which was not a recognized member state. The chairman of the 21st session of the governing council in his closing statement stated: "“The long arms of hunger and poverty know no legal or political boundaries, yet development aid very often faces constraints that limit its outreach. During this Session we have overcome just such a constraint by establishing a Fund for Gaza and the West Bank, a territory that is not a Member State of IFAD. There is indeed satisfaction in overcoming bounds and in reaching out to PEOPLE not to boundaries”. In response to this, the United States representative stated that although “the United States supports international efforts to assist the Palestinian people, not only to improve day-to-day lives, but also to build a constituency for peace", because of "US legal restrictions, our contributions and assistance cannot be used for the proposed IFAD special fund". This situation revealed how IFAD is subject to judicial and political challenges, which can undermine its mission. Rustel Martha wrote of the incident that it highlighted "the fact that when organizations embark on activities which cannot be clearly identified as having been authorized by the constituent instrument, it may place membership contribution at risk".

== Structure ==
The International Fund for Agricultural Development (IFAD) relies on three key entities for governance: the governing council, the executive board, and the president.

=== Governing Council ===
The IFAD is governed by its primary decision-making body, the Governing Council, which holds full powers to make decisions. This council is composed of representatives from all IFAD Member States and gathers on an annual basis. It is attended by official delegates such as Governors, Alternate Governors, and other appointed advisors. Observers, including representatives from non-member states seeking membership, the Holy See, the Sovereign Order of Malta, and approved UN agencies, intergovernmental and non-governmental organizations, are also invited to attend.

The Governing Council has full authority over the fund's operations and makes decisions on important matters such as the approval of new members, the election of the President, issues concerning the permanent seat, the administrative budget, and the establishment of policies, criteria, and regulations.

Sessions of the Governing Council are led by the Chairperson of the Bureau, which is made up of one Chairperson and two Vice-chairpersons, all elected from among the Governors of member states for a two-year period. The President also participates in Governing Council meetings without voting rights.

=== Executive Board ===
The general operations of the fund are managed by the Executive Board, which exercises authority either directly provided by Agreement of Establishing the IFAD or delegated by the Governing Council. The Board is made up of 18 members and as many as 18 alternate members, all elected from the fund's members at the annual session of the Governing Council. Each member serves a three-year term within allocated Lists and Sub-Lists. The fund's president chairs the executive board, attending its meetings without voting privileges.

==== Current framework of the Executive Board ====
IFAD List A
Member	Alternate member
Italy	Austria
France	Belgium
Japan	Denmark
Canada	Finland
United States	Spain
Norway	Sweden
Germany	Switzerland
Netherlands	United Kingdom

IFAD List B
Member	Alternate member
Venezuela	Algeria
Saudi Arabia	Indonesia
Nigeria	Qatar
Kuwait	United Arab Emirates

IFAD List C1
Member	Alternate member
Egypt	Angola
Cameroon	Tanzania

IFAD List C2
Member	Alternate member
China	Pakistan
India	South Korea

IFAD List C3
Member	Alternate member
Brazil	Argentina
Mexico	Peru

=== President ===
The president of the IFAD is appointed by the Governing Council with a two-thirds majority vote and serves a term of four years, renewable once. Under exceptional circumstances, the term may be extended by up to six months on the recommendation of the executive board. The president oversees the fund's operations, including organizing the staff and managing appointments and dismissals, following regulations set by the executive board.

The president may appoint a vice-president to assist with assigned responsibilities and serves as the fund's legal representative. The current president of the IFAD is Alvaro Lario from Spain, who took over from Gilbert Houngbo in late 2022. His term of office began on 1 October 2022, and will run until 31 March 2027. As of 2024, Álvaro Lario, who serves as the president of IFAD, took on the additional role of chair of UN-Water, the United Nations Inter-Agency Mechanism on All Freshwater Related Issues, Including Sanitation.

List of presidents of the International Fund for Agricultural Development
No.	Name	Country of origin	Took office	Left office
1.	Abdelmuhsin M. Al-Sudeary	Saudi Arabia	1977	1984
2.	Idriss Jazairy	Algeria	1984	1993
3.	Fawzi Al-Sultan	Kuwait	1993	2001
4.	Lennart Båge	Sweden	2001	2009
5.	Kanayo F. Nwanze	Nigeria	2009	2017
6.	Gilbert Houngbo	Togo	2017	2022
7.	Alvaro Lario	Spain	2022	Incumbent

== Membership ==
"Membership of the Fund shall be open to any State member of the United Nations, or of any of its specialized agencies, or of the International Atomic Energy Agency. Membership shall also be open to any groupings of States whose members have delegated to it powers in fields falling within the competence of the fund, and which is able to fulfil all the obligations of a Member of the Fund" (Art. 3, sec. 1 of the Agreement Establishing IFAD).

IFAD currently has 180 member states, categorized into three main groups that reflect the economic diversity and development priorities of its members.

List A includes high-income countries that contribute significantly to IFAD's financial resources. These nations have declared themselves ineligible for IFAD financing and do not qualify for Official Development Assistance (ODA) as defined by the Organisation for Economic Co-operation and Development (OECD). Their role is crucial in providing funding for global agricultural development initiatives.

List B includes member states from the Organization of the Petroleum Exporting Countries (OPEC) that also contribute to IFAD's resources. This category comprises oil-rich countries that may be eligible for particular agricultural development initiatives, demonstrating development aid.

List C includes developing nations eligible for IFAD money and services, many of which also contribute to the organization's resources. This list is divided into three regional sub-lists: C1 (countries in Africa), C2 (countries in Europe, Asia, and the Pacific) and C3 (countries in Latin America and Caribbean).

=== List A – 29 member states ===
- Austria
- Belgium
- Canada
- Cyprus
- Denmark
- Estonia
- Finland
- France
- Germany
- Greece
- Hungary
- Iceland
- Ireland
- Israel
- Italy
- Japan
- Lithuania
- Luxembourg
- Netherlands
- New Zealand
- Norway
- Poland
- Portugal
- Russia
- Spain
- Sweden
- Switzerland
- United Kingdom
- United States

=== List B – 12 member states ===
- Algeria
- Gabon
- Indonesia
- Iran
- Iraq
- Kuwait
- Libya
- Nigeria
- Qatar
- Saudi Arabia
- United Arab Emirates
- Venezuela

=== Sublist C1 – 50 member states ===
- Angola
- Benin
- Botswana
- Burkina Faso
- Burundi
- Cape Verde
- Cameroon
- Central African Republic
- Chad
- Comoros
- Congo
- Democratic Republic of the Congo
- Djibouti
- Egypt
- Equatorial Guinea
- Eritrea
- Eswatini
- Ethiopia
- Gambia
- Guinea
- Guinea-Bissau
- Ivory Coast
- Kenya
- Lesotho
- Liberia
- Madagascar
- Malawi
- Mali
- Mauritania
- Mauritius
- Morocco
- Mozambique
- Namibia
- Niger
- Nigeria
- Rwanda
- São Tomé and Príncipe
- Senegal
- Seychelles
- Sierra Leone
- Somalia
- South Africa
- South Sudan
- Sudan
- Togo
- Tanzania
- Tunisia
- Uganda
- Zambia
- Zimbabwe

=== Sublist C2 – 57 member states ===
- Afghanistan
- Albania
- Armenia
- Azerbaijan
- Bangladesh
- Bhutan
- Bosnia and Herzegovina
- Cambodia
- China
- Cook Islands
- Croatia
- East Timor
- Fiji
- Georgia
- India
- Jordan
- Kazakhstan
- Kiribati
- Kyrgyzstan
- Laos
- Lebanon
- Malaysia
- Maldives
- Malta
- Marshall Islands
- Micronesia
- Moldova
- Mongolia
- Montenegro
- Myanmar
- Nauru
- Nepal
- Niue
- North Korea
- North Macedonia
- Oman
- Pakistan
- Palau
- Papua New Guinea
- Philippines
- Romania
- Samoa
- Serbia
- Solomon Islands
- South Korea
- Sri Lanka
- Syria
- Tajikistan
- Thailand
- Tonga
- Turkey
- Tuvalu
- Ukraine
- Uzbekistan
- Vanuatu
- Vietnam
- Yemen

=== Sublist C3 – 32 member states ===
- Antigua and Barbuda
- Argentina
- Bahamas
- Barbados
- Belize
- Bolivia
- Brazil
- Chile
- Colombia
- Costa Rica
- Cuba
- Dominica
- Dominican Republic
- Ecuador
- El Salvador
- Grenada
- Guatemala
- Guyana
- Haiti
- Honduras
- Jamaica
- Mexico
- Nicaragua
- Panama
- Paraguay
- Peru
- Saint Kitts and Nevis
- Saint Lucia
- Saint Vincent and the Grenadines
- Suriname
- Trinidad and Tobago
- Uruguay

== See also ==
- Food security
- Development Finance Institution
- Agrarian socialism
- Sustainable agriculture
- Development-supported agriculture
- Famine
