= UN World Water Development Report =

Global report

The United Nations World Water Development Report of United Nations
- First holder: 1988

The United Nations World Water Development Report (WWDR) is a global report that provides an authoritative, comprehensive assessment of the world’s freshwater resources. It is produced annually by the UNESCO World Water Assessment Programme and published by UNESCO on behalf of UN-Water.

The report examines the ways that the world's water resources are being managed and the varied water problems that different regions of the world are experiencing. It takes a close look at growing water problems worldwide, such as access to clean water and sanitation, and the cross-cutting issues which affect them, such as: energy, climate change, agriculture, and urban growth. The report also offers recommendations on how freshwater resources could be managed more sustainably.

The content of the report comes from the coordinated efforts of 26 UN agencies that make up UN-Water, working with governments, international organizations, non-governmental organizations and other stakeholders.

In 2018, the topic of the report was "Nature-based Solutions for Water". In 2017, the topic of the report was "Wastewater: The Untapped Resource".

== Background ==
In 1998, the Sixth Session of the Commission on Sustainable Development stated that there was a need for regular, global assessments on the status of freshwater resources. In response to this recommendation, the member organizations of UN-Water (known then as the ACC Subcommittee on Water Resources) decided to produce a World Water Development Report every three years, with an aim to reporting on the status of global freshwater resources and the progress achieved in reaching the Millennium Development Goals related to water.

== Objectives ==
The UN World Water Development Reports monitor changes in the world’s freshwater resources and their management.

The WWDRs also include the findings of case study development projects initiated in different geographic regions of the world. The case studies provide an in-depth analysis of the state of freshwater resources and related challenges that directly affect the livelihoods of people in the societies. In the production of WWDRs, more than 64 countries have been covered at basin or national level.

== Reports ==
=== 2019: Leave No One behind ===
The 2019 report was entitled "Leaving No One Behind". It explained how water resources management and access to water supply and sanitation services help to overcome poverty and various other social and economic inequities. It was launched at the Human Rights Council in Geneva on 19 March 2019.

=== 2018: Nature for Water ===
The 2018 report was launched 19 March 2018 during the 8th World Water Forum, and in conjunction to the World Water Day (22 March 2018). Its title was "Nature-based Solutions for Water".

=== 2012: Managing Water under Uncertainty and Risk ===
The fourth report was launched at the sixth World Water Forum in Marseille, France in March 2012. Its title was "Managing Water under Uncertainty and Risk".

=== 2009: Water in a Changing World ===
The third report, “Water in a Changing World”, was launched at the fifth World Water Forum held in Istanbul, Turkey in March, 2009.

The Report has four main sections, apart from the introduction and the recommendations: “drivers of change,” “the use of the resource for humans and for ecosystems,” “the state of the resource,” and “responding to a changing world: what are the options?”

Case Studies: The third report is accompanied by the first stand-alone volume of WWAP case studies, titled "Facing the Challenges", which includes 20 studies from Africa, Asia and the Pacific, Europe and Latin America, where conditions of water-related stress and socio-economic settings vary widely. Case studies include the Autonomous Community of the Basque Country (Spain), Bangladesh, Cameroon, China, the Cholistan desert (Pakistan), Estonia, the Han River basin (Republic of Korea), Istanbul (Turkey), the Lake Merín basin (Brazil and Uruguay), La Plata River basin (Argentina, Bolivia, Brazil, Paraguay and Uruguay), the Netherlands, Pacific island states, the Po River basin (Italy), Sri Lanka, Sudan, Swaziland, Tunisia, Uzbekistan, the Vuoksi River basin (Finland and the Russian Federation) and Zambia.

Links to Report and related materials:

- UN World Water Development Report 3: "Water in a Changing World" and "Facing the Challenges" (2009) http://www.unesco.org/new/en/natural-sciences/environment/water/wwap/wwdr/wwdr3-2009/downloads-wwdr3/
- Facts and Figures [1.5 MB, full-color PDF] http://www.unesco.org/new/fileadmin/MULTIMEDIA/HQ/SC/pdf/WWDR3_Facts_and_Figures.pdf
- Messages http://www.unesco.org/water/wwap/wwdr/wwdr3/messages.shtml
- Side Publications Series http://www.unesco.org/water/wwap/wwdr/wwdr3/side_publications.shtml

=== 2006: Water: A Shared Responsibility (2006) ===
The second WWDR, “Water: A Shared Responsibility,” was presented in 2006 at the fourth World Water Forum in Mexico City, Mexico.

Case studies: The second report contains 16 case studies, including the Autonomous Community of the Basque Country (Spain), the Danube River Basin (Albania, Austria, Bosnia-Herzegovina, Bulgaria, Croatia, the Czech Republic, Germany, Hungary, Italy, the Republic of Macedonia, Moldova, Poland, Romania, Serbia and Montenegro, the Slovak Republic, Slovenia, Switzerland and Ukraine), Ethiopia, France, Japan, Kenya, Lake Peipus (Estonia and the Russia), Lake Titicaca (Peru and Bolivia), Mali, Mexico, Mongolia, the La Plata River Basin (Brazil, Bolivia, Paraguay, Argentina, and Uruguay), South Africa and Sri Lanka.

Links to report and related materials:

- UN World Water Development Report 2: Water: A Shared Responsibility (2006) http://www.unesco.org/water/wwap/wwdr/wwdr2
- Executive Summary http://unesdoc.unesco.org/images/0014/001444/144409E.pdf

=== 2003: Water for People, Water for Life (2003) ===
The first UN World Water Development Report, called “Water for People, Water for Life” was presented at the third World Water Forum in Japan in 2003. The report provides an assessment of the globe’s water crisis and assesses progress in 11 challenge areas (health, food, environment, shared water resources, cities, industry, energy, risk management, knowledge, valuing water and governance).

Case Studies: The first Report looked at seven case studies, including the Chao Phraya River basin (Thailand), Greater Tokyo (Japan), Lake Peipus (Estonia, Russia), Lake Titicaca basin (Bolivia, Peru), Ruhuna basins (Sri Lanka), Seine-Normandy basin (France), and the Senegal River basin (Guinea, Mali, Mauritania, Senegal).

Links to report and related materials:

- UN World Water Development Report 1: Water: A Shared Responsibility (2006) http://www.unesco.org/water/wwap/wwdr/wwdr1
- Executive Summary http://www.unesco.org/water/wwap/wwdr/wwdr1/ex_summary/index.shtml

== See also ==
- World Water Assessment Programme
- UNESCO
- Freshwater
- Sustainable Development Goals
- World Water Forum
