= IRC (disambiguation) =

IRC, or Internet Relay Chat, is a protocol for real-time Internet chat and messaging.

IRC may also refer to:

== Businesses and organizations ==
=== Businesses ===
- IRC Limited, a Hong-Kong–based mining firm (founded 2010)
- IRC Tire, a Japanese tyre manufacturer (founded 1926)

=== Global humanitarian charities ===
- IRC (organization), a water/sanitation think tank (founded 1968)
- International Red Cross and Red Crescent Movement (founded 1863)
- International Rescue Committee, for refugees (founded 1933)
- International Rescue Corps, for urban search and rescue (founded 1981)

=== Government and politics ===
- Immigration, Refugees and Citizenship Canada (formed 1994)
- Immigration removal centres, United Kingdom (formed 2002)
- Australian Industrial Relations Commission (1988–2010)
- Industrial Reorganisation Corporation, United Kingdom (1966–1970)
- Inland Regional Center, for disabled Californians (formed 1971)
- Independence Republic of Sardinia, an Italian separatist party (formed 2002)

== Events ==
- International Rostrum of Composers, a contemporary classical music forum
- Intercontinental Rally Challenge, a rally championship

== Places in the United States ==
- Indian River County, Florida
- Circle City Airport, Alaska (IATA code: IRC)

== Science and technology ==
- International Rating Certificate (IRC), a system of handicapping sailboats and yachts for the purpose of racing
- Two-Micron Sky Survey catalogue entries, which have the form IRC followed by a five-digit number, standing for infrared catalogue
  - IRC -10414, a red supergiant star
  - IRC +10420, a yellow hypergiant star
- Incrementally related carriers, a standard for video channel frequencies
- Infrared reflective coating, on a type of incandescent light bulb
- IRC-Galleria, a social networking website in Finland, commonly called "IRC"
- Intrinsic reaction coordinate, in the analysis of the energy profile of a chemical reaction

== Other uses ==
- Internal Revenue Code, the U.S. federal tax code
- Infrared reflective coating, on insulated glazing
- International reply coupon, used to post a letter to most countries
- International Residential Code, a set of codes and standards; see International Building Code

== See also ==
- IRCC (disambiguation)
