= World Water Day =

Annual United Nations observance

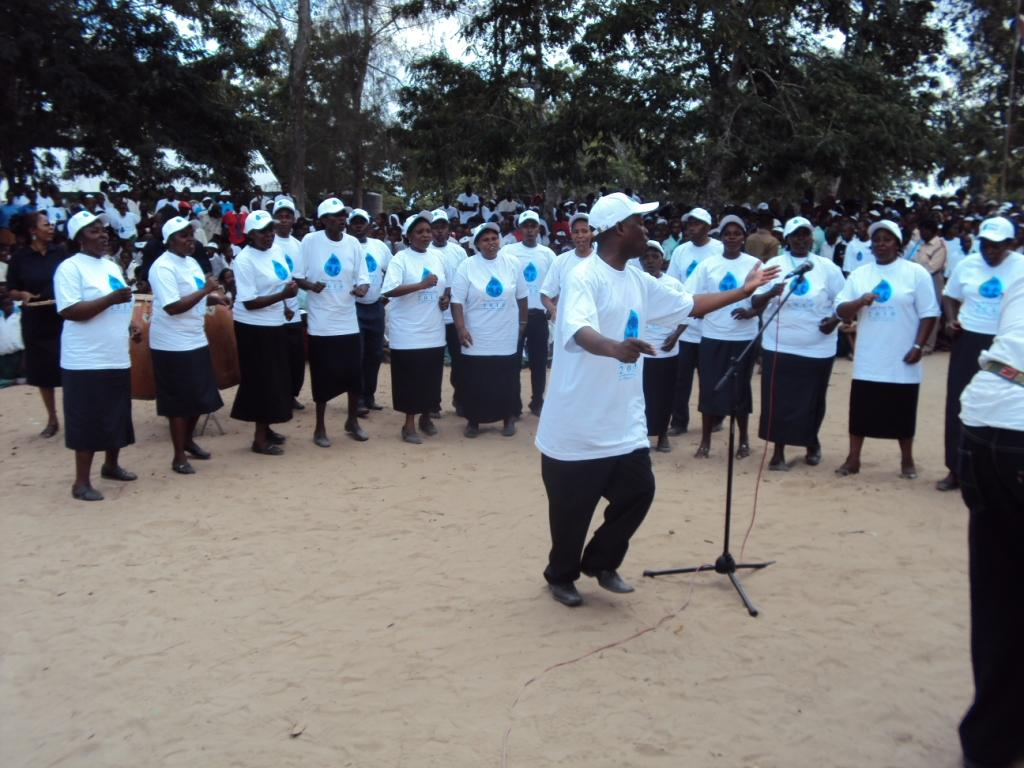
- A World Water Day celebration in Kenya in 2011
- Observed by: People and organizations worldwide, including all UN member states
- Date: 22 March
- Next time: 22 March 2027
- Frequency: Annual
- First time: 22 March 1993
- Related to: Water, Sustainable development, Sustainability

World Water Day is an annual United Nations (UN) observance day held on 22 March that highlights the importance of fresh water. The day is used to advocate for the sustainable management of freshwater resources. The theme of each year focuses on topics relevant to clean water, sanitation and hygiene (WASH), which is in line with the targets of Sustainable Development Goal 6. The UN World Water Development Report (WWDR) is released each year around World Water Day.

UN-Water is the convener for World Water Day and selects the theme for each year in consultation with UN organizations that share an interest in that year's focus. The theme for 2021 was "Valuing Water" and the public campaign invited people to join a global conversation on social media to "tell us your stories, thoughts and feelings about water".

Previous themes include:

- 2016: “Better Water, Better Jobs”
- 2017: “Why Waste Water?”
- 2018: “The Answer is in Nature”
- 2019: “Leaving No One Behind”
- 2020: "Water and Climate Change"
- 2021: Valuing Water
- 2022: Groundwater
- 2023: Accelerating Change
- 2024: Leveraging Water for Peace
- 2025: Glacier Preservation
- 2026: Water and Gender

World Water Day is celebrated around the world with a variety of events. These can be theatrical, musical or lobbying in nature. The day can also include campaigns to raise money for water projects. The first World Water Day designated by the United Nations was in 1993.

== Objectives and structure ==
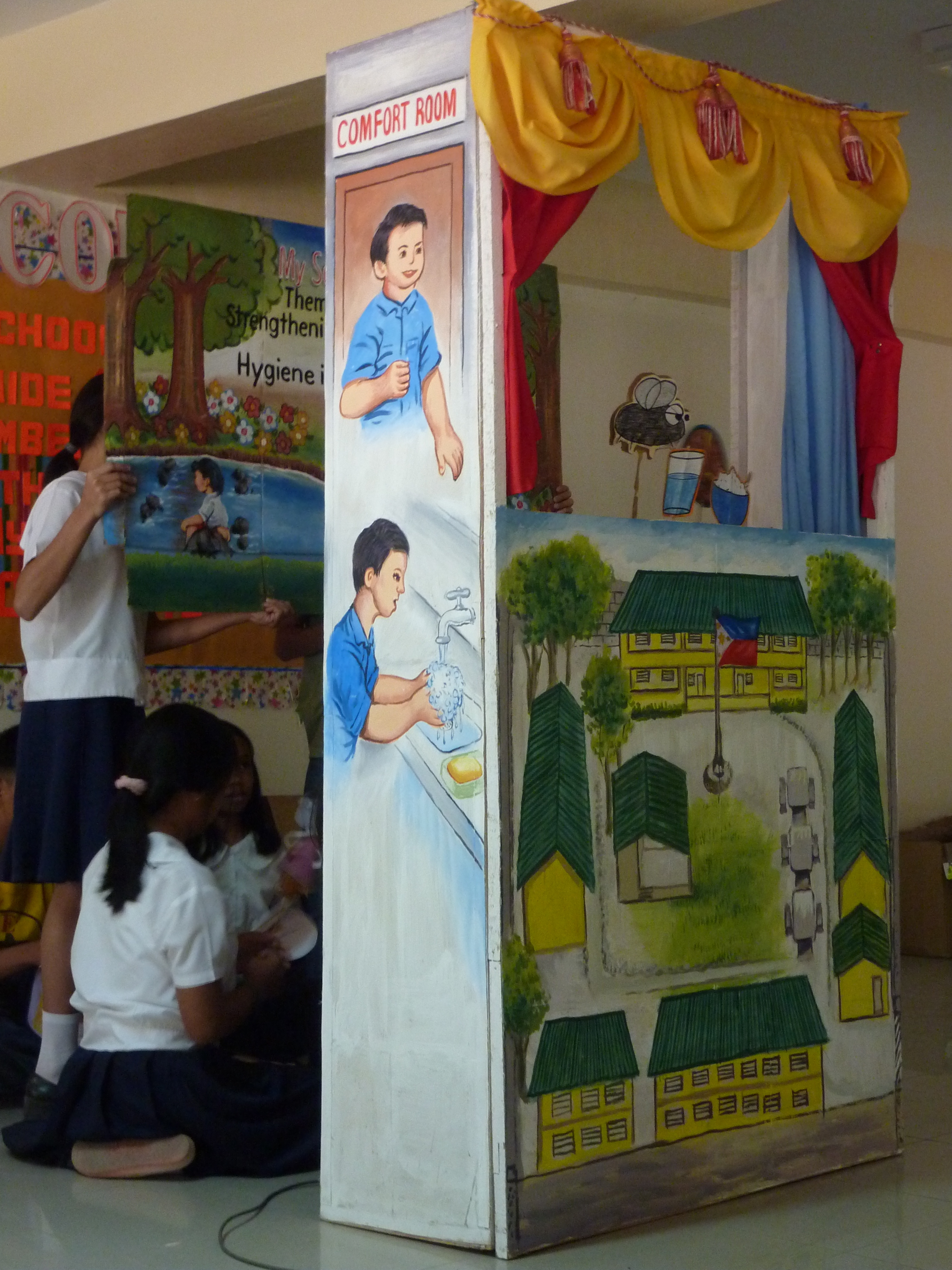
Children presenting a puppet show for the "My School Toilet" contest in Cagayan de Oro, Philippines, for World Water Day in 2010

World Water Day is an international observance day. The intention is to inspire people around the world to learn more about water-related issues and to take action to make a difference. In 2020, due to the COVID-19 pandemic, there was an additional focus on hand washing and hygiene.

Relevant issues include water scarcity, water pollution, inadequate water supply, lack of sanitation, and the impacts of climate change (which is the theme of World Water Day 2020). The day brings to light the inequality of access to WASH services and the need to assure the human right to water and sanitation.

The World Water Day website announces events, activities and volunteer opportunities. In 2020, featured stories are about adapting to the water effects climate change and using water more efficiently.

=== Convener ===
UN-Water coordinates activities with UN member organisations who share an interest in that year's theme. UN-Water mobilizes organizations of all kinds to action, whether globally or locally.

== Examples of activities ==
Non-governmental organizations active in the WASH sector, such as UNICEF, WaterAid and Water and Sanitation for the Urban Poor (WSUP), use the day to raise public awareness and get media attention for water issues and inspire action. Activities have included releasing publications and films, as well as organizing round tables, seminars and expositions.

End Water Poverty, a global civil society coalition with 250 partner organizations, sponsors Water Action Month each year and offers an event-planning guidebook.

The UN World Water Development Report (WWDR) is released each year on World Water Day. Information related to the annual theme gives decision-makers tools to implement sustainable use of water resources.

More and more initiatives in schools and universities are educating people about the importance of conserving and managing water resources. For example, Michigan State University held a contest for "best World Water Day poster" in 2017. Primary school children in the Philippines participated in a "My School Toilet" contest in 2010.

== History ==
This day was first formally proposed in Agenda 21 of the 1992 United Nations Conference on Environment and Development in Rio de Janeiro. In December 1992, the United Nations General Assembly adopted resolution A/RES/47/193 by which 22 March of each year was declared World Day for Water.

In 1993, the first World Water Day was observed. An archive of previous World Water Day campaign websites also exists.

== Annual themes ==
=== Prior to 2014 ===
In the years prior to 2014, the annual themes were as follows:

- 1994: Caring for our Water Resources is Everybody's Business
- 1995: Women and Water
- 1996: Water for Thirsty Cities
- 1997: The World's Water: Is there enough?
- America ad: Water for Health
- 2002: Water for Development. The poor and deteriorating state of water resources in many parts of the world demand integrated water resources planning and management.
- 2003: Water for Future. Maintain and improve the quality and quantity of fresh water available to future generations.
- 2004: Water and Disasters. Weather, climate and water resources can have a devastating impact on socio-economic development and on the well-being of humankind.
- 2005: Water for Life Decade 2005–2015. The United Nations General Assembly at its 58th session in December 2003 agreed to proclaim the years 2005 to 2015 the International Decade for Action, beginning with World Water Day, 22 March 2005. The phrase Water for Life Decade was also used.
- 2006: Water and Culture. The theme drew the attention to the fact that there are as many ways of viewing, using, and celebrating water as there are cultural traditions across the world.
- 2007: Coping With Water Scarcity. Highlighted water scarcity worldwide and the need for increased integration and cooperation to ensure sustainable, efficient and equitable management of scarce water resources, both at international and local levels.

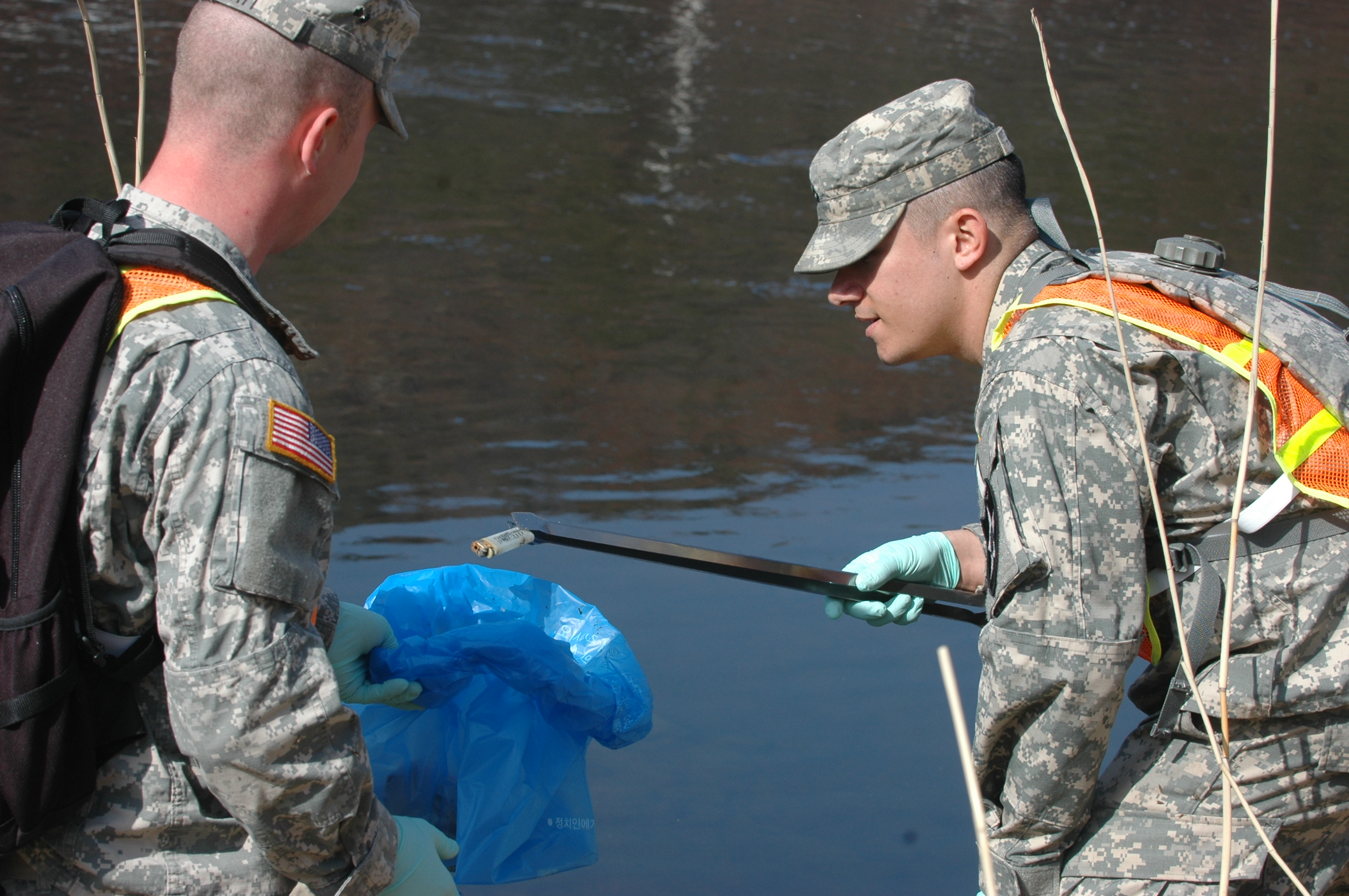
World Water Day 2009: US soldiers cleaning a river in South Korea

- 2008: Sanitation. 2008 was also the International Year of Sanitation.
- 2009: Trans Waters. Special focus placed on trans-boundary waters.
- 2010: Clean Water for a Healthy World. Dedicated to water quality, reflecting its importance alongside quantity of the resource in water management.
- 2011: Water for cities: responding to the urban challenge. The aim was to spotlight and encourage governments, organizations, communities, and individuals to actively engage in addressing the challenges of urban water management.
- 2012: Water and Food Security: The World is Thirsty Because We are Hungry. On the occasion of 2012 World Water Day, the International Committee of the Red Cross (ICRC) called attention to the water-related challenges faced by civilians caught up in fighting and intense civil unrest.
- 2013: International Year of Cooperation. In December 2010, the United Nations General Assembly declared 2013 as the United Nations International Year of Water Cooperation. In reflection of this declaration, the 2013 World Water Day was dedicated to water cooperation.

=== 2014 – Water and Energy ===
The 2014 theme of Water and Energy emphasized the close linkages and interdependence of water and energy and brought attention to the water-energy nexus. About 8% of the energy generated globally is used for pumping, treating and transporting water to various consumers. Furthermore, generating and transmitting energy requires the use of water resources, particularly for hydroelectric, nuclear, and thermal energy sources.

The aim of that year's theme was to facilitate the development of policies and crosscutting frameworks that would bridge ministries and sectors. It was meant to lead the way to energy security and sustainable water use in a green economy.

Journalists from 11 countries in Asia met in Tokyo from 20 to 21 March 2014 to discuss the importance of water. The event included discussion panels on topics such as privatization of services, integration between water and energy and modernization of water services. The journalists also developed four joint stories and 20 individual story ideas for a network of Asian journalists writing on water (and energy) in social media.

=== 2015 – Water and Sustainable Development ===
With the theme "Water and Sustainable Development", the year 2015 provided an important opportunity to consolidate and build upon the previous World Water Days to highlight water's role in the sustainable development agenda. The Millennium Development Goals (MDGs) were to have been achieved by 2015, so the year lent itself to discussions of the post-MDG period and aspirations for water and sustainable development. With the launch of the Sustainable Development Goals (SDGs), World Water Day gave specific emphasis to SDG 6, which calls for water and sanitation for all, by encouraging discussion of how SDG 6 could be achieved by 2030.

=== 2016 – Better Water, Better Jobs ===
The 2016 theme of "Better water, better jobs" highlighted the correlation between water and job creation, both directly and indirectly, by water sources around the globe. The theme led to a collaboration with the International Labour Organization. As water scarcity becomes more of a reality, industries heavily dependent on water like textiles and agriculture are at risk of increased costs, which threatens salaries and jobs. Increased costs may then be passed on to consumers.

The theme also highlights how an abundance of quality water can change people's jobs and lives for the better. The 2016 celebration created recognition for those working to improve water quality and availability, and the need for many to transition to other and better jobs. Three out of four of jobs worldwide are water-dependent. Water shortages and lack of access may limit economic growth in the years to come, according to the 2016 United Nations World Water Development Report.

=== 2017 – Why Waste Water? ===
In 2017, the theme was "Why Waste Water?" which was about reducing and reusing wastewater. The theme was a play on words as it related to both the aspect of wasting water and issues around wastewater, namely treatment and reuse. Wastewater is a valuable resource to help achieve the Sustainable Development Goal Number 6. One aspect of Target 6.3 is to halve the proportion of untreated wastewater and also to increase the recycling and safe reuse of water across the globe. After appropriate treatment, wastewater can be used for a variety of purposes. Industry, for example, can reuse water in cooling towers and agriculture can reuse water for irrigation.

An example activity for 2017 was the Wikipedia edit-a-thon organized by members of the Sustainable Sanitation Alliance on 19–21 March 2017. The purpose of the activity was to improve water and sanitation related content on Wikipedia just ahead of World Water Day. The goal was to improve the quantity and quality of sanitation information available on Wikipedia for the use of teachers, journalists and the general public.

=== 2018 – Nature for Water ===
The theme in 2018 explored how nature can be used to overcome the water challenges of the 21st century. This could be in the form of nature-based solutions to water-related challenges. For example, reducing floods, droughts, water pollution and protecting ecosystems could be solved using natural means, which nature uses, rather than man-made approaches. Restoring wetlands, implementing constructed wetlands, green roofs, green infrastructure, planting new forests, reconnecting rivers to floodplains, are some examples. Each of these use natural processes to rebalance the water cycle and improve human health and livelihoods.

=== 2019 – Leaving No One Behind ===
The theme of 2019 was about tackling the water crisis by addressing the reasons why so many people are being left behind. Marginalized groups – women, children, refugees, indigenous peoples, disabled people – are often overlooked, and may face discrimination, as they try to access safe water. UN-Water asserts that "water services must meet the needs of marginalized groups and their voices must be heard in decision-making processes".

=== 2020 – Water and Climate Change ===
The theme of World Water Day 2020 was about water and climate change – and how the two are inextricably linked. UN-Water states that "adapting to the water effects of climate change will protect health and save lives". Also, using water more efficiently will reduce greenhouse gas emissions. Due to the COVID-19 pandemic, the 2020 campaign also promoted messages of hand washing and hygiene and gave guidance on staying safe while supporting the campaign.

=== 2021 – Valuing Water ===
The theme for 2021 was "Valuing Water". People were invited to join a global conversation to "tell us your stories, thoughts and feelings about water" on social media using the hashtag "#Water2me". The campaign looked beyond the issue of pricing, asking the public: "How is water important to your home and family life, your livelihood, your cultural practices, your wellbeing, your local environment?".

=== 2022 – Groundwater, Making the Invisible Visible ===
The theme for 2022 was "Groundwater, Making the Invisible Visible". Groundwater is the largest source of freshwater on earth. However, being stored underneath the surface, it is often overlooked. Therefore, IGRAC and UNESCO-IHP initiated a World Water Day exclusively focused on this resource. The campaign was built around three main groundwater-related topics/issues, namely: (1) The invisible ingredient in food, (2) a resource without borders, and (3) a finite supply. The campaign also built around other products and events in this so-called 'year of groundwater'. The groundwater catalogue was launched during the World Water Forum in Dakar, Senegal. The final event related to the campaign was the Groundwater Summit 2022, held in Paris, France.

=== 2023 – Accelerating Change ===
The theme for 2023 was "accelerating change". Dysfunction throughout the water cycle undermines progress on all major global issues, from health to hunger, gender equality to jobs, education to industry, and disasters to peace.

=== 2024 – Water for Prosperity and Peace ===
The theme for 2024 was "Water for Peace". The key messages read, "Water can create peace or spark conflict. When water is scarce or polluted, or when people have unequal, or no access, tensions can rise between communities and countries.", "Prosperity and peace rely on water. As nations manage climate change, mass migration and political unrest, they must put water cooperation at the heart of their plans.", and "Water can lead us out of crisis. We can foster harmony between communities and countries by uniting around the fair and sustainable use of water – from United Nations conventions at the international level, to actions at the local level."

=== 2025 - Glacier preservation ===
The theme for 2025 was "Glacier Preservation". Glaciers are critical to life - their meltwater is essential for drinking water, agriculture, industry, clean energy production and healthy ecosystems.

=== 2026 - Water and Gender ===
The theme for 2026 was "Water and Gender". Giving women and girls an equal voice in decisions concerning water makes services more inclusive, sustainable and effective. However, women and girls are still too often left out of decision-making, leadership, funding and representation. The United Nations World Water Day 2026 called for a rights-based approach to addressing the water crisis, where the voices, leadership and agency of women and girls are fully recognized.

== Impacts ==
Every year, World Water Day campaign messages and publications reach millions of people through social media, dedicated websites and other channels. In 2016, the UN-Water annual report stated that social media engagement (hashtag #WorldWaterDay), had a maximum potential reach of 1.6 billion people worldwide in 2016. Over 500 events in 100 countries were registered on the World Water Day website that year.

In 2017, 700 individual events were held in 110 countries and there were over 500,000 authors on social media using the hashtag '#WorldWaterDay'. In 2018, there was a 25% increase in both the number of website visits and the maximum potential reach on social media largely due to celebrity support and a coordinated communications approach across the United Nations.

In 2021, the World Water Day public campaign invited people to take part in a social media conversation (#Water2me) about the value of water. More than 6,000 public conversations took place in over 140 countries on social media from November 2020 to mid-February 2021.

== See also ==
- World Toilet Day
- Water issues in developing countries
- List of awareness days
