= End Water Poverty =

Campaign for sanitation and safe water

End Water Poverty campaign logo

End Water Poverty is an international campaign that helps to provide sanitation and potable water.

The coalition members consist mainly of non-governmental organizations from around the world who recognize sanitation and water's vital role in tackling poverty, and creating sustainable development.

== History ==
The campaign was launched on World Water Day, March 22, 2007.

== Member organizations ==
- Action Against Hunger
- WASH United
- Oxfam
- WaterAid
- Initiative: Eau
- IRC (WASH)
