= International Drinking Water Decade, 1981–90 =

The International Drinking Water Decade or International Decade of Water or International Drinking Water Supply and Sanitation Decade, now known as The First Water Decade was the ten-year period 1981 - 1990 designated by the United Nations to bring attention and support for clean water and sanitation worldwide. It was formulated and promoted by Asit K. Biswas in 1977.

== History ==
The 1977 United Nations 'Water Conference' at Mar del Plata set up an International Drinking Water Decade, 1981-1990. Its aim was to make access to clean drinking water available across the world.

The decade focussed on safe water and sanitation for everybody by 1990. Among the obstacles were the following: whether developing countries will give water and sanitary disposal high enough priority to get results; if an effective organization can be created within countries to carry out a water and waste programme; how manpower training and financing can be accomplished; and whether or not appropriate technology will be used.

This first water decade, brought water to over 1.2 billion people and sanitation to almost 770 million. However, growth and rapid urbanization, together with the low level of public awareness about health, has drastically reduced many countries' abilities to keep up with need; and today, there are still almost 1.1 billion people who have inadequate access to water and 2.4 billion without appropriate sanitation.

Since the decade ended in 1990, hopes for improvement are centred on the World Water Assessment Programme, a joint effort of the UN system and its member states, which includes a biennial assessment of the state of global freshwater resources. The launch of the second International Water Decade during 2005-2015 will also provide much needed impetus for the assessment program.

== See also ==
- Village-level operation and maintenance (pumps)
- Water for Life Decade
