= World Water Forum =

Event focusing on issues surrounding water

The World Water Forum is one of the largest water-related gathering and conference that is jointly organized by the World Water Council and a co-host city that takes place every three years.

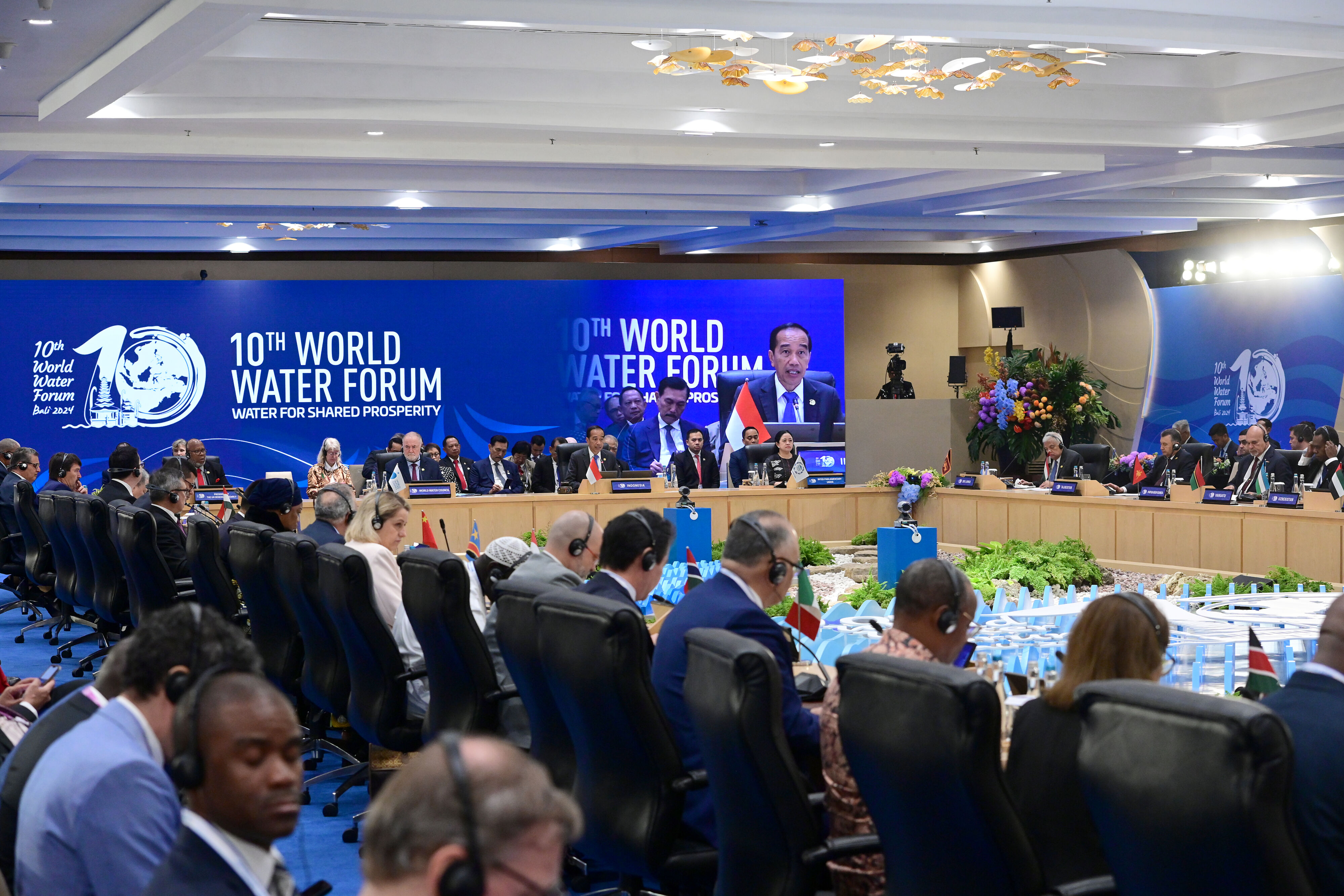
The heads of state or government meeting session of the 10th World Water Forum in 2024

== Aim ==
World Water Forum aims to:

- Raise awareness with decision makers and the public at large on water issues and, subsequently, to generate action;
- Contribute to improving access to water supply and sanitation and report on progress towards meeting the Millennium Development Goals;
- Provide opportunities to progressively develop shared visions on challenging water issues, to develop new partnerships and to pave the way for cooperation and action among a wide diversity of organisations and individuals;
- Encourage greater media attention for water issues and solutions

== Locations ==
| Location | Year | Approximate Total Number of Attendees (including Fair and Expo) | Theme |
|---|---|---|---|
| Riyadh | 2027 | | |
| Bali, Indonesia | 2024 | 7,334 | "Water for Shared Prosperity" |
| Dakar, Senegal | 2022 | TBA | "Water Security for Peace and Development" |
| Brasília, Brazil | 2018 | 120,000 | "Sharing water" |
| Daegu–Gyeongbuk, South Korea | 2015 | ~ 30,000 entries | "Water for our Future" |
| Marseille, France | 2012 | approx. 35,000 entries | "Solutions for Water" |
| Istanbul, Turkey | 2009 | over 30,000 | "Bridging Divides for Water" |
| Mexico City, Mexico | 2006 | 27,500 | "Local Actions for a Global Challenge" |
| Kyoto, Japan | 2003 | 250,000 | "A Forum with a Difference" |
| The Hague, Netherlands | 2000 | 39,100 | "From Vision to Action" |
| Marrakesh, Morocco | 1997 | 500 | "Vision for Water, Life and the Environment" |

== Components ==
The forum is made up of four primary components:

1. The thematic programme which provides the substantive discussions in the form of sessions and panels.
2. The political process which provides the opportunity for discussion with elected officials (local authorities, parliamentarians, ministers) and resulting in various statements and commitments.
3. The regional process which provides perspectives on water from all regions of the world.
4. The fair and expo which provides a space for all stakeholders to showcase their contributions.

Each of these components benefits from extensive preparatory processes that commence two years prior to the World Water Forum.

Past editions have included other features, such as side events, a learning centre, a children's forum, a youth forum, a children's education village, water and film encounters and cultural entertainment.

== World Water Council ==
World Water Council
- Abbreviation: WWC
- Formation: 1996
- Type: French association
- Headquarters: Marseille, France
- Region served: Worldwide
- Official language: French, English
- President: Loïc Fauchon France
- Website: WWC Official website

The World Water Council (WWC), also known as the Conseil Mondial de l'Eau (CME), is an international think tank. It was founded in 1996, with its headquarters in Marseille, France. It has 358 members (as of February 2020) which encompass organizations from the UN and intergovernmental organizations, the private sector (construction, engineering and manufacturing companies), governments and ministries, academic institutions, international organizations, local governments and civil society groups. Founders and constituent members of the World Water Council are the International Commission on Irrigation and Drainage, the International Union for Conservation of Nature (IUCN), the International Water Association (IWA), AquaFed (The International Federation of Private Water Operators), Suez Lyonnaise des Eaux, the United Nations agencies UNDP and UNESCO, as well as the World Bank.

Its stated mission is "to promote awareness, build political commitment and trigger action on critical water issues at all levels, including the highest decision-making level, to facilitate the efficient conservation, protection, development, planning, management, and use of water in all its dimensions on an environmentally sustainable basis for the benefit of all life on earth."

Every third year the World Water Council organizes the World Water Forum in close collaboration with the authorities of the hosting country. The Forum is the largest international event in the field of water. The 6th World Water Forum took place in Marseille, France, in 2012 and the 7th World Water Forum in Daegu-Gyeongbuk, Republic of Korea, in April 2015. The 8th World Water Forum took place in Brasilia, Brazil, from 18 to 23 March 2018 under the overarching theme 'Sharing Water'. The 9th World Water Forum was held in Dakar, Senegal, in March 2021, while the 10th World Water Forum has been organized in Bali, Indonesia during May 2024. Saudi Arabia was handed over the flag of World Water Forum on 24 May 2024 at the closing ceremony of 10th World Water Forum in Bali. Saudi Arabia will be hosting the 11th World Water Forum in 2027.

The World Water Council is financed primarily through membership fees, and additional support is provided by the host City of Marseille. Specific projects and programs are financed through donations and grants from governments, international organizations, and NGOs.

=== Colleges and membership distribution ===
As of February 2020, the World Water Council members are divided into 5 colleges:

- College 1: Intergovernmental organizations – 4%
- College 2: Governments and government promoted organizations – 22%
- College 3: Commercial organizations – 22%
- College 4: Civil society organizations – 22%
- College 5: Professional and academic organizations – 31%

=== Criticism ===
Critics pin on the World Water Council for promotion of privatisation of water supply, an indication of which is a great influence of financial institutions and global water corporations. The Canadian activist Tony Clarke describes the World Water Council as a smoke screen for the water lobby. Medha Patkar, an activist from India, gave a passionate speech against privatization of water at the 2nd World Water Forum in The Hague in 2000.

== History ==
=== 1st World Water Forum: Morocco ===
The first World Water Forum, following the creation of the World Water Council, took place in Marrakesh, Morocco, on 21–23 March 1997. It laid the basis for the development of a long-term "Vision for Water, Life and the Environment in the 21st Century." Sessions included:

- Perspectives on world water
- On the road toward a long-term vision for world water
- The challenges of the 21st century
- Celebration of World Water Day

=== 2nd World Water Forum: Netherlands ===
The 2nd World Water Forum in The Hague from 17 to 22 March 2000 generated much debate on the World Water Vision and the associated Framework for Action, dealing with the state and ownership of water resources, their development potential, management and financing models, and their impact on poverty, social, cultural and economic development and the environment. The ministerial declaration identified the following key challenges: meeting basic water needs, securing food supply, protecting ecosystems, sharing water resources, managing risks, valuing water and governing water wisely.

- 15,000 people were involved in the Vision related discussions
- 5,700 participants attended the forum
- 114 ministers and officials from 130 countries were present at the ministerial conference
- 500 journalists reported on the event
- 32,500 people visited the World Water Fair

The 2nd World Water Forum was a major event in the global water community. It helped to raise awareness of the global water crisis and to galvanize action to address the key challenges. The key challenges identified in the ministerial declaration are still relevant today, and they require urgent attention.

=== 3rd World Water Forum: Japan ===
The 3rd World Water Forum, held in Kyoto, Shiga and Osaka, Japan, from 16 to 23 March 2003, assembled a huge number and variety of stakeholders as compared to previous editions of the forum. In addition, the debate was furthered within the context of the new commitments of meeting the goals set forth at the United Nations in New York (2000), in Bonn (2001) and then in Johannesburg (2002).

The 3rd World Water Forum offered 351 sessions under 38 themes. In addition, the "World Panel on Financing Water Infrastructure", chaired by Michel Camdessus, presented its conclusions on what should be done to find adequate financing for water infrastructure and offered specific proposals on how this can be achieved, and by whom.

New concepts were introduced such as a Virtual Water Forum, which consisted of about 166 interactive sessions available through Internet, and the Water Voices Project, where 27,000 opinions of ordinary citizens were collected from 142 countries. The World Water Actions report inventoried over 3,000 local water actions.

The 3rd World Water Forum also invited the participation of indigenous people, recognizing that indigenous land and water rights is crucial to the discussion of water interests worldwide. Indigenous people have often been excluded from discussions about clean drinking water, water sanitation, and rights to water sources, so this invitation legitimized the rights of indigenous people to help create water related policy. Their participation resulted in the signing of the Indigenous Peoples Kyoto Declaration, which centered on the rights of indigenous people to self determine usage of their own water resources.

=== 4th World Water Forum: Mexico ===
During the 4th World Water Forum in 2006 (14-22 March) in Mexico City, close to 20,000 people from throughout the world participated in 206 working sessions, where a total of 1600 local actions were presented. Participants included official representatives and delegates from 140 countries including 120 mayors and 150 legislators, and 78 ministers. Nearly 1400 journalists were present.

Noteworthy events included:

- The presentation of the 2nd UN World Water Development Report
- The establishment of the Asia-Pacific water forum
- The launch of the Water Integrity Network
- The publication of:
  - The Right to Water - From concept to implementation
  - Task Force on Financing Water For All - Report 1. Enhancing Access To Finance For Local Governments - Financing Water For Agriculture
  - Costing MDG Target 10 on Water Supply and Sanitation - Comparative Analysis, Obstacles and Recommendations
  - Official Development Assistance for Water from 1990 to 2004 - Figures and trends

=== 5th World Water Forum: Turkey ===
Over 30,000 participants from 182 countries took part in the 5th World Water Forum, from 16 to 22 March 2009 in Istanbul, Turkey. More than 400 organisations prepared together over 100 sessions organised according to 6 themes, 7 regional reports and 5 high-level panels.

For the first time in the World Water Forum's history, a heads of state meeting was organized. In addition, the ministerial statement and water guide were developed through a series of four preparatory meetings of government officials, in which thematic and regional coordinators and representatives of major groups participated. Further exchanges with stakeholder representatives were organized through ministerial roundtable discussions during the 5th World Water Forum.

Local and regional authorities in attendance produced the Istanbul Water Consensus (IWC), a new compact for local and regional authorities willing to commit to adapting their water infrastructure and services to the emerging challenges they are facing. It was also the first time that over 250 parliamentarians from around the world jointly started to address water issues.

In addition to the session programme, a number of high-level panels were organized on issues such as water-related disasters, sanitation, the water-food-energy nexus and financing. Following the 5th World Water Forum, the panel on water and climate change continued its efforts to bring forth its recommendations to the UN Framework Convention on Climate Change process and CoP-15 discussions held in Copenhagen in December 2009.

For more detailed information on the 5th World Water Forum, a collection of the official outcomes and statements can be found in the Global Water Framework. This compilation presents all the major official documents of the forum: heads of state appeal; ministerial statement; Istanbul Water Guide; ministerial roundtable reports; parliamentarians for water; Istanbul water consensus; compilation of thematic commitments; regional outputs; children's declaration; and youth declaration.

Another publication, Water at a Crossroads, contains a cross-cutting analysis of the key decisions and major themes addressed at the Forum, including climate change; disasters; water, food and energy; MDGs; finance; public/private management; governance; transboundary issues; the right to water; and data availability.

Civil society protest was considerable, notably about the negative effects of dams. Blockades and marches were organised, and Turkey deported peaceful protesters.

=== 6th World Water Forum: France ===
The 6th WWF was held in Marseille, France, from March 12 to 17, 2012. There were, again, extensive protests against the greenwashing of water commodification by corporations and the effects of dams. It was also criticized for not explicitly recognizing a human right to water and sanitation, as was done by the UN General Assembly in 2010.

=== 7th World Water Forum: Korea ===
The 7th World Water Forum on the theme of "Water for Our Future" took place from 12 to 17 April 2015 in Daegu–Gyeongbuk, South Korea.

=== 8th World Water Forum: Brazil ===
The 8th World Water Forum took place in Brasília, Brazil, from 18 to 23 March 2018, the first one in South America.

=== 9th World Water Forum: Senegal ===
The 9th edition of the World Water Forum will be held for the first time in West Africa in 2022. The 9th World Water Forum will take place in Dakar, Senegal. This 9th edition was initially scheduled for 2021, but was postponed due to the COVID-19 pandemic. The venues for the forum will be the Abdou DIOUF International Conference Centre and Dakar Arena. Eventually, it was decided that the event will be an in-person event and not a hybrid or online event.

=== 10th World Water Forum: Indonesia ===
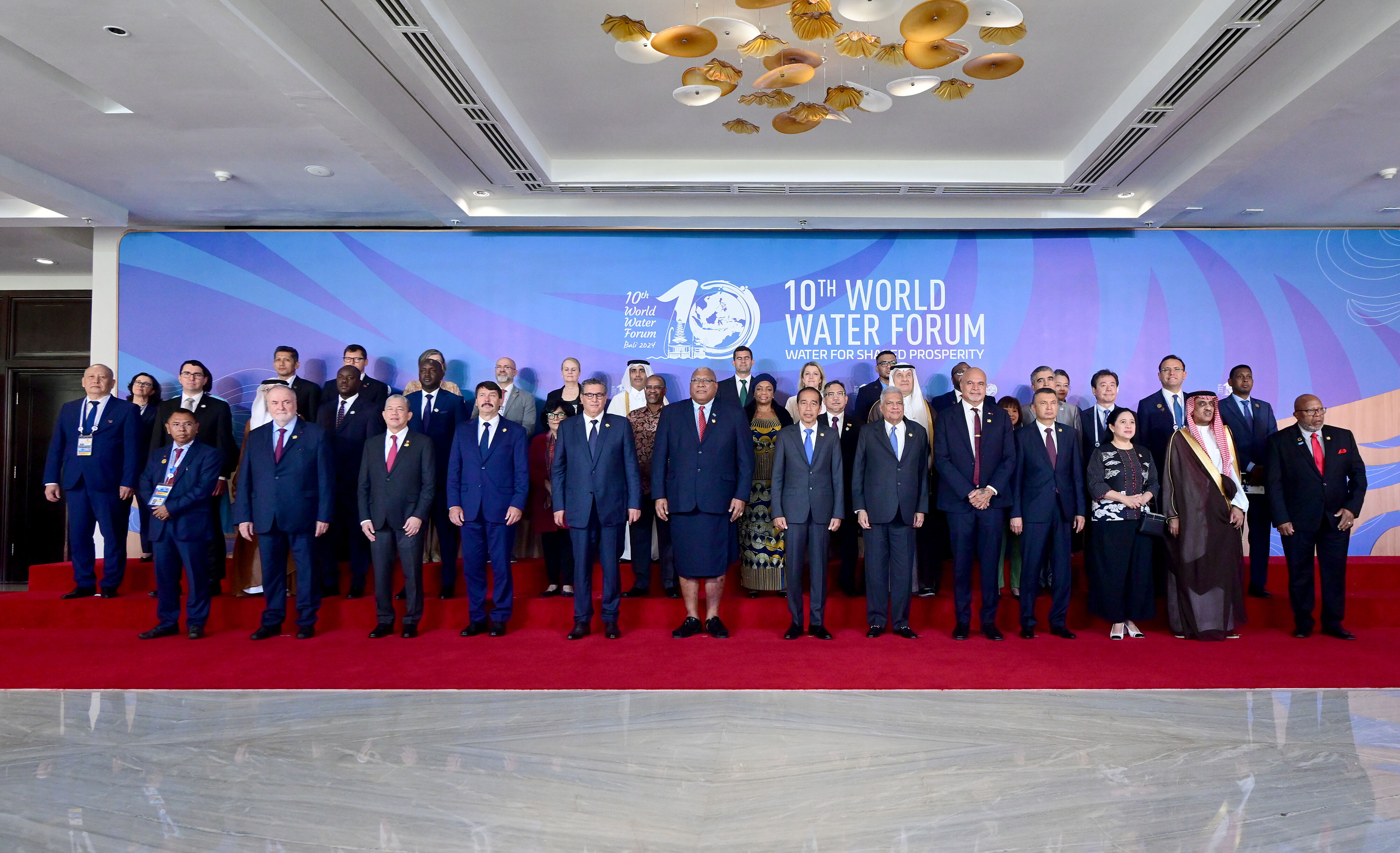
Family photo of heads of state/government at the 10th World Water Forum

The 10th edition of the World Water Forum was held for the first time in Southeast Asia, from 18 to 25 May 2024. The 10th World Water Forum took place in Bali, Indonesia. The venues were the Bali International Convention Center and Bali Nusa Dua Convention Center in Nusa Dua for the core events, the Bali Turtle Island Development (BTID) for the Balinese water purification ceremony (Segara Kerthi), and the Garuda Wisnu Kencana Cultural Park for the welcoming dinner event. The 10th World Water Forum was considered as Indonesia's diplomatic victory.

The highlights of the event were:

- The launch of the International Tropical Seaweed Research Center in Badung Regency, Bali.
- A joint Ministerial Declaration was signed.
- The agreement of the "Bali Basin Action Champions Agenda", which contain new commitments to support river and basin management to achieve the Sustainable Development Goals.

== Prizes ==
Two water-related prizes have been awarded during successive World Water Forums: The King Hassan II Great World Water Prize and the Kyoto World Water Grand Prize. Two additional prizes were awarded during the 5th World Water Forum in Istanbul: the Turkish Republic Prime Minister's Water Prize and the Compromiso México Water Prize.

== See also ==
- World Water Day
- Virtual water
