= WSSD =

Chicago, Illinois; United States
- Frequency: 88.1 MHz
- Branding: The Blues Station

Programming
- Format: Blues

Ownership
- Owner: Lakeside Telecommunications, Inc.

History
- First air date: September 30, 1980 (license issued)
- Last air date: June 25, 2014

Technical information
- Facility ID: 36428
- Class: D
- ERP: 10 watts
- HAAT: 31.0 meters (101.7 ft)
- Transmitter coordinates: 41°43′44″N 87°33′3″W

WSSD (88.1 MHz, "The Blues Station") was a non-commercial radio station licensed for Chicago, Illinois, United States. It was an all-blues station and its 10 watt signal covered only the South Side of Chicago.

The station went silent for technical upgrades on June 25, 2014. In October 2015, the Federal Communications Commission sent a letter to the station that its license expired as a matter of law for not returning to the air by June 2015; the letter was returned undelivered. The FCC deleted the WSSD call sign on November 18, 2015.
