= International Year of Sanitation =

2008 United Nations year

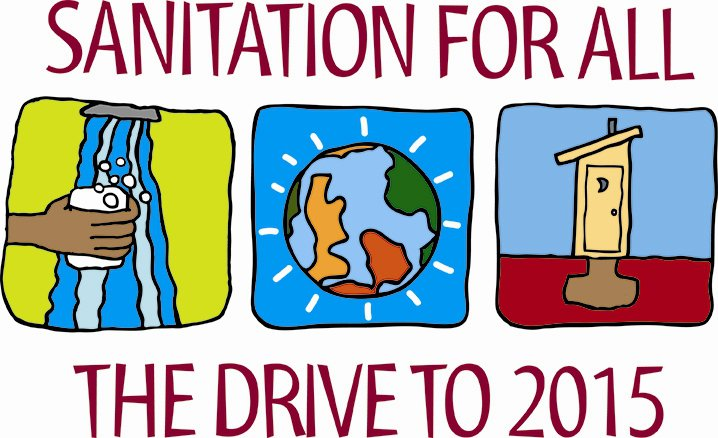
Modified logo of International Year of Sanitation, used in the UN Drive to 2015 campaign logo

The year 2008 was declared the International Year of Sanitation by the United Nations in conjunction with the Water for Life Decade.

The United Nations General Assembly has declared 2008 the International Year of Sanitation. Worldwide there are roughly 2.6 billion people who do not have access to basic sanitation today. The goal of 2008 as the International Year of Sanitation was to help raise awareness of this crisis and to accelerate progress towards reaching the UN's Millennium Development Goals (MDG's) and cutting the number of people without access to basic sanitation in half by the year 2015.

== Objectives ==
The progress towards achieving the sanitation MDG has been slow and varied in different parts of the world. The main objective in declaring 2008 as the International Year of Sanitation is to help get the sanitation MDG back on track for achieving the goal of halving the proportion of people without access to basic sanitation by 2015. Accomplishing this goal will require cooperation between different UN agencies, especially UNDESA and UNICEF, as well as government agencies, NGO's, private companies, and academic circles.

The year aimed to develop awareness and action to meet the Millennium Development Goals sanitation target. Particular concerns are:

- Removing the stigma around sanitation, so that the importance of sanitation can be more easily and publicly discussed.
- Highlighting the poverty reduction, health and other benefits that flow from better hygiene, household sanitation arrangements and wastewater treatment.

== Outcomes ==
The network Sustainable Sanitation Alliance was formed in 2007 in order to have a joint label for the planned activities for the International Year of Sanitation in 2008 and to be able to align the organisations with each other for further potential initiatives.

== History ==
The spotlight on sanitation as a major issue worldwide began in 2000 with the United Nations adoption of the Millennium Development Goals, which aim at diminishing poverty and increasing health and the general well-being of all people. Further development of these goals was discussed in 2002 at the World Summit on Sustainable Development in Johannesburg, with the inclusion of access to sanitation as fundamental to achieving all goals surrounding bringing an end to poverty. The Johannesburg Plan of Action established the objective of halving the number of people without access to basic sanitation by the year 2015.

== See also ==
- International observance
