= Álvaro Lario =

Spanish financial economist

Álvaro Lario Hervás
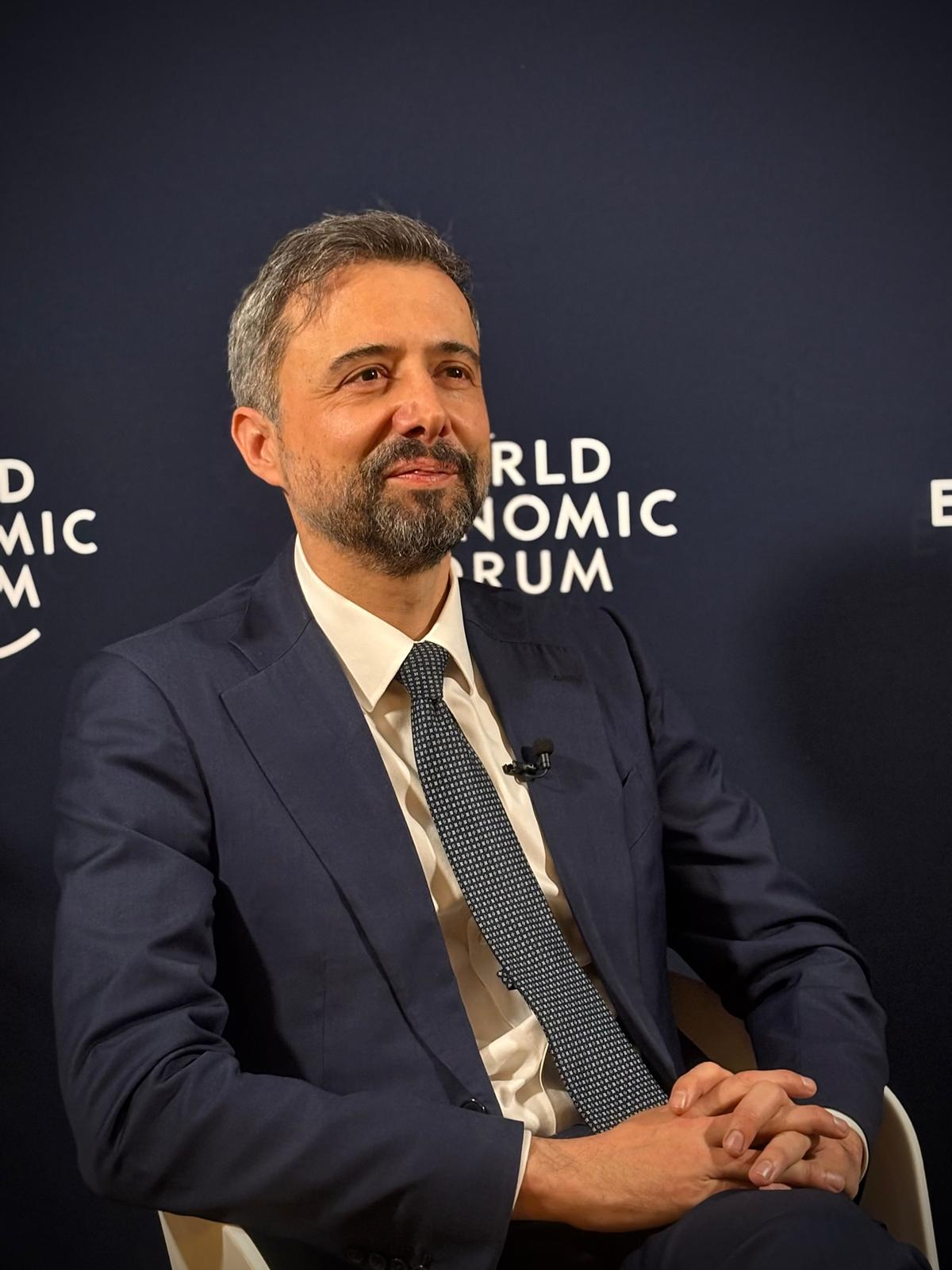
- Álvario Lario in April 2025

President of the International Fund for Agricultural Development
- Incumbent
- Assumed office July 2022
- Vice President: Gérardine Mukeshimana

Personal details
- Born: Madrid, Spain
- Education: PhD in Financial Economics
- Alma mater: Complutense University of Madrid
- Occupation: Economist
- Website: LinkedIn

Álvaro Lario Hervás (born 1977) is a Spanish financial economist, serving as President of the United Nations International Fund for Agricultural Development (IFAD) since July 2022.

== Early life and education ==
Lario was born in Madrid, Spain. He has a Master of Research in Economics from the London Business School, a Master of Finance from Princeton University, and a PhD in Financial Economics from the Complutense University of Madrid.

== Career ==
Lario began his career as Head of Alternative Investments at Renta 4 Banca in 2006. He became an adjunct professor at Instituto de Empresa Business School, a position he held until 2011. He also served as the Principal Portfolio Officer at the World Bank's International Finance Corporation prior to his work at IFAD.

Lario served as vice president for financial operations and CFO at IFAD beginning in 2018. During his tenure as CFO, in an effort to diversify funding streams, IFAD became the first UN fund to receive a credit rating.

In 2022, he was elected by IFAD's Member States as the seventh President of the agency, succeeding Gilbert Houngbo.

In January 2024, Dr Lario was appointed Chair of UN-Water, the body that coordinates the United Nations' work on water and sanitation, by the United Nations (UN) Secretary-General, António Guterres.
