= UN-Water =

United Nations interagency mechanism

United Nations Water
- Abbreviation: UN-Water
- Formation: 2003
- Type: Interagency mechanism
- Headquarters: Geneva, Switzerland
- Head: UN-Water Chair Alvaro Lario
- Parent organization: United Nations
- Website: www.unwater.org

United Nations Water (UN-Water) is an interagency mechanism that coordinates the efforts of United Nations (UN) entities and international organizations working on water and sanitation issues.

"There is no single United Nations Agency, Fund or Programme dedicated exclusively to water issues. In fact, over 30 United Nations organizations carry out water and sanitation programmes because these issues run through all of the United Nations’ main focus areas."

UN-Water's role is to ensure the UN "delivers as one" in response to water-related challenges, providing effective support to countries in their work towards internally-agreed water-related goals and targets, such as the Sustainable Development Goal 6 on water and sanitation.

UN-Water led the development of the first UN System-wide Strategy for Water and Sanitation, launched in 2024, through which UN entities have committed to uniting their efforts and maximizing the collective strength of the UN system to support countries to make faster and greater progress on water and sanitation.

The majority of UN-Water's offices are located in Geneva, Switzerland.

== Issues ==
Water is at the core of sustainable development and is critical for socio-economic development, healthy ecosystems and for human survival itself. Water is vital for reducing the global burden of disease and improving the health, welfare and productivity of populations. Today, 2.2 billion people lack access to safely managed drinking water services and 3.5 billion people lack safely managed sanitation services.

Water is also at the heart of adaptation to climate change, serving as the crucial link between the climate system, human society and the environment. Without proper water governance, there is likely to be increased competition for water between sectors and an escalation of water crises of various kinds, triggering emergencies in a range of water-dependent sectors. Water scarcity is a significant issue around the world. Approximately 10% of the global population – around 720 million people – lived in countries with high and critical water stress levels in 2021.

The physical world of water is closely bound up with the socio-political world, with water often a key factor in managing risks such as famine, migration, epidemics, inequalities and political instability. Water-related disasters, such as flood and drought, have dominated the list of disasters over the past 50 years and account for 70% of all deaths related to natural disasters.

== Activities ==
UN-Water has three areas of work, which it carries out through the coordinated efforts of its Members and Partners.

=== Key policy processes ===
UN-Water Members and Partners have helped embed water and sanitation in several agreements, such as the 2030 Agenda for Sustainable Development (which led to the Sustainable Development Goals (SDGs)), the 2015-2030 Sendai Framework for Disaster Risk Reduction, the 2015 Addis Ababa Action Agenda on Financing for Development, and the 2015 Paris Agreement within the UN Convention Framework on Climate Change.

The inaugural UN System-wide Strategy for Water and Sanitation was developed by UN-Water and launched in 2024. Mandated by UN Member States, the Strategy responds to the outcomes of the UN 2023 Water Conference and Water Action Agenda, which elevated water as a central priority across the UN. In 2025, UN-Water published the Collaborative Implementation Plan, containing "a common set of forward-looking, transformative, system-wide actions that UN entities and its partners can implement together in response to the higher level of ambition set forth in the Strategy".

UN-Water will inform and support the processes around the in-depth review of SDG 6 at the UN High-level Political Forum on Sustainable Development in 2026, UN Water Conferences in 2026 and 2028, and the follow-up on the Pact for the Future in 2027.

=== Monitoring and reporting ===
To meet the needs of the 2030 Agenda, UN-Water launched the Integrated Monitoring Initiative for SDG 6, building on and expanding the experience and lessons learned during the Millennium Development Goals (MDGs) period (2000-2015).

All the custodian agencies of the SDG 6 global indicators have come together under the initiative, which includes the work of the WHO/UNICEF Joint Monitoring Programme for Water Supply and Sanitation (JMP), the inter-agency initiative GEMI and UN-Water Global Analysis and Assessment of Sanitation and Drinking-Water (GLAAS).

=== Campaigns ===
Every year, UN-Water coordinates the United Nations international observances on freshwater and sanitation: World Water Day and World Toilet Day. Depending on the official UN theme of the campaign, they are led by one or more UN-Water Members and Partners with a related mandate. On World Water Day, UN-Water releases the UN World Water Development Report focusing on the same topic as the campaign.

== Governance ==
=== Members and Partners ===
UN agencies, programmes and funds with a water-related mandate are Members of UN-Water. Partners are international organizations, professional unions, associations or other civil-society groups that are actively involved in water and that have the capacity and willingness to contribute tangibly to the work of UN-Water.

=== Senior Programme Managers ===
The UN-Water Senior Programme Managers are the representatives of the UN-Water Members at UN-Water. They provide the overall governance and strategic direction. Collectively, they constitute the highest operational decision-making body of UN-Water.

=== Chair, Vice-Chair, Secretary ===
The Chair of UN-Water is nominated among the UN Executive Heads, after consultations in the UN System Chief Executives Board for Coordination. The vice-chair of UN-Water is elected among the UN-Water Senior Programme Managers. The UN DESA Senior Programme Manager serves as Secretary of UN-Water ex-officio.

=== List of UN-Water Chairs ===
| # | Picture | Name | Nationality | Took office | Left office |
|---|---|---|---|---|---|
| 7 | A portrait photo of UN-Water Chair Alvaro Lario | Alvaro Lario | Spain | 2023 | Present |
| 6 | | Gilbert Houngbo | Togo | 2017 | 2023 |
| 5 | | Guy Ryder | United Kingdom | 2016 | 2017 |
| 4 | | Michel Jarraud | France | 2012 | 2016 |
| 3 | | Zafar Adeel | Pakistan | 2010 | 2012 |
| 2 | | Pasquale Steduto | Italy | 2007 | 2010 |
| 1 | | Jamie Bartram | United Kingdom | 2004 | 2007 |

== History ==
1977: The UN's Intersecretariat Group for Water Resources coordinates UN activities on water and has a three-person secretariat in the UN Department of Economic and Social Affairs' (UN-DESA) predecessor in New York.

1992: The Group is subsumed into the UN Administrative Coordination Committee's (ACC) Subcommittee on Water Resources, which functions for several years before being disbanded. Members continued to meet informally to continue collaborating on water issues.

1993: The UN General Assembly designates 22 March as World Water Day.

2003: UN-Water is established, endorsed by the successor to the ACC: the UN System Chief Executives Board for Coordination.

2005-2015: UN-Water coordinates the 'Water for Life' International Decade for Action, culminating in the Sanitation Drive to 2015, a campaign to meet the 2000-2015 Millennium Development Goals' sanitation target and end open defecation.

2012: The Key Water Indicator Portal is launched, backed by a federated database containing data from several UN agencies.

2013: The UN General Assembly designates 19 November as World Toilet Day.

2014: UN-Water launches its 2014-2020 Strategy in support of the 2030 Agenda.

2015: The Integrated Monitoring Initiative for SDG 6 is launched with the aim of reporting on progress on water and sanitation in a coherent and coordinated way, shaped by input from UN-Water's Members and Partners.

2015: The 2030 Agenda's Sustainable Development Goals are launched and a dedicated goal on water and sanitation is adopted by the UN General Assembly with input from UN-Water's Technical Advisory Unit.

2018: UN-Water produces the first SDG 6 Synthesis Report on Water and Sanitation, presenting the global status of SDG 6 and other water-related targets, and exploring interlinkages within SDG 6 and the wider 2030 Agenda.

2019: UN-Water creates the SDG 6 Data Portal, bringing together data on all the SDG 6 global indicators and other key parameters, and tracks overall progress.

2020: UN-Water launches the SDG 6 Global Acceleration Framework.

2023: UN 2023 Water Conference takes place.

2024: The UN System-wide Strategy for Water and Sanitation is launched.
